= Cara Dillon discography =

In 1990, at the age of fourteen, folk artist Cara Dillon formed a traditional Irish music band with school friends called Óige. In 1995 she joined folk super-group Equation and signed a record deal with WEA.

Dillon's solo career began in 2001 with the release of her debut album Cara Dillon. Signed to Rough Trade Records for her first three, Dillon released her fourth solo album in 2009 on her own label, Charcoal Records. Included in the list below, in addition to her own, are guest appearances on other artists' releases as well as collaborations and compilations.

== Studio albums ==
Year	Album details	Peak chart positions		
Year	Album details	IRE	UK	UK Indie
2001	Cara Dillon: Label: Rough Trade	—	—	—
2003	Sweet Liberty: Label: Rough Trade	34	116	40
2006	After the Morning: Label: Rough Trade	50	124	20
2009	Hill of Thieves: Label: Charcoal Records	—	69	7
2014	A Thousand Hearts: Label: Charcoal / Sony	—	42	6
2016	Upon a Winter's Night: Label: Charcoal Records	—	—	16
2017	Wanderer: Label: Charcoal Records	—	89	—
2021	Live at Cooper Hall: Label: Charcoal Records	—	—	—
2024	Coming Home: Label: Charcoal Records	—	—	—
"—" denotes releases that did not chart.

== Singles and promos ==
- "Man in the Rain" (credited to: Mike Oldfield featuring Cara) (1998)
- "Black Is the Colour" (2001)
- "Blue Mountain River" (2001)
- "High Tide" (2003)
- "There Were Roses" (2003)
- "Everywhere" (2004)
- "Never in a Million Years" (2006)
- "This Time/I Wish You Well" (2006)
- "If I Prove False" (2008)
- "The Hill of Thieves" (2009)
- "Come Dream A Dream" (2012) "Disney Dreams!"
- "Shotgun Down The Avalanche" (2014)
- "Bright Morning Star" (2014)
- "Tern and the Swallow" (2017)

== DVDs ==
- The Redcastle Sessions (2008)
- Cara Dillon Live At The Grand Opera House (September 2009)

== Collaborations and guest appearances ==
- Óige - Live (1994)
- Equation - Return To Me (1996) (2003)
- Óige - Bang On (1996)
- Mike Oldfield - Tubular Bells III (1998) - Vocals on Man in the Rain.
- Ghostland - Interview With The Angel (2001)
- Equation - First Name Terms (2002)
- Seth Lakeman - The Punch Bowl (2002)
- Tommy Flemming - Voice Of Hope (2005)
- Dickon Hinchcliffe with Cara Dillon - Did You Ever Wonder Why? (2005)
- Keeping Mum - Music From The Motion Picture (2005)
- Judge Jules - Proven Worldwide (US) (2006)
- Seth Lakeman - Freedom Fields (2006)
- Judge Jules - Ordinary Day - UK Dance Singles Chart #3 (2006)
- Judge Jules - Proven Worldwide (UK) - UK Indie Chart #40 (2006)
- Anjunabeats Worldwide 1 - Various (UK) - 2Devine (2006)
- Cara Dillon vs. 2Devine - Black Is The Colour (UK) - Promo CD (2006)
- Cara Dillon vs. 2Devine - Black Is The Colour (UK) - Promo Vinyl (2006)

== Other ==
- Roots & Branch 1: A New World (2000)
- Ashley Hutchings - Street Cries (2001)
- Billy Connolly's World Tour of England, Ireland & Wales - DVD Bonus (2004)
- Other Voices: Songs Of A Room 2 (2004)
- Various - Rubber Folk (2006)
- 2006 Radio Ballads - Thirty Years Of Conflict (2006)
- 2006 Radio Ballads - The Songs Of The Radio Ballads (2006)
- The Transatlantic Sessions Series 3 DVD (various artists) (2007)
