= Beautiful Days (festival) =

Music festival in Devon, England

- Genre: Rock, alternative rock, folk, punk rock, dance, experimental
- Dates: August
- Locations: Escot Park, Ottery St Mary, Devon, England
- Years active: 2003–present
- Website: www.beautifuldays.org

Beautiful Days is a music festival that takes place in August at Escot Park, near Ottery St Mary, Devon. The festival was founded by, and is managed by, the band the Levellers and was first held in 2003. The festival has no corporate sponsorship or branding, leading to Virtual Festivals proclaiming it "the festival that sells out ... by not selling out". In 2011 Beautiful Days was pronounced "Best Family Festival" by the UK Festival Awards, later winning the "Grass Roots Festival Award" in 2015, as well as the "Best Medium Festival" award from FestivalKidz the same year. Every festival has sold out in advance; although the 2020 festival was cancelled due to the COVID-19 pandemic. The current capacity is 17,500.

== History ==
The Levellers began the festival at Escot Park in 2003, after a previous venture (the Green Blade Festival) ran into licensing difficulties. The Levellers' singer Mark Chadwick explained the thinking behind the ethos of the new festival in an interview with eFestivals

"The whole reason for doing it is that many festivals are shit. They just haven't got that right element of cultural exchange. We're trying to get that 'weirdness' back into festivals, which is the whole point of doing it ... as soon as the corporate hand sticks its tiniest bit in, they're fucked."

The festival is held on the penultimate weekend of August, which until 2017 was the same weekend as the now defunct V Festival; Chadwick stated that although this was not originally deliberate, he liked it because "the ethos of the festival is (the) antithesis of V."

== Musical styles ==
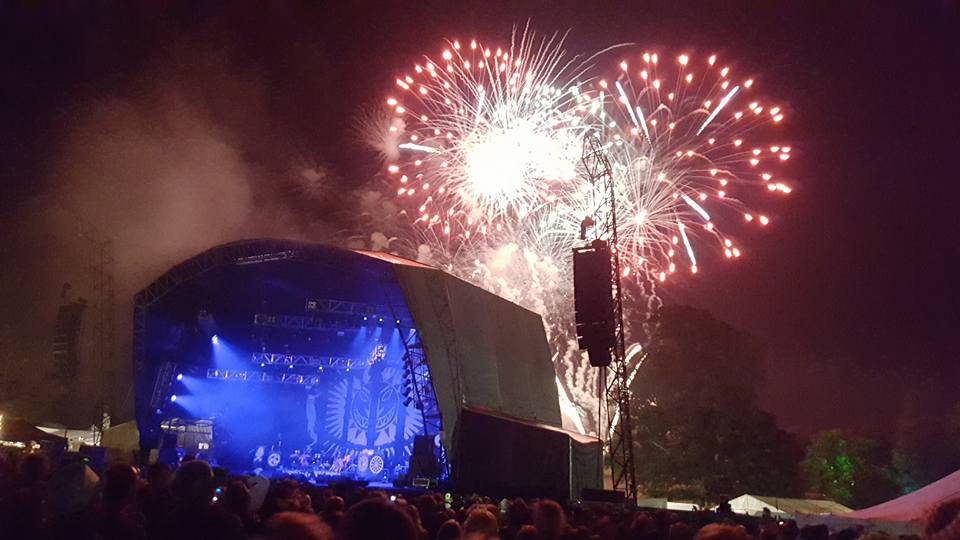
Fireworks after The Levellers' set, 2015

Beautiful Days has a more diverse range of musical artists than many other festivals. Headline artists have included reggae (Lee "Scratch" Perry, The Wailers), alternative rock (James, Carter the Unstoppable Sex Machine), punk (The Stranglers, The Pogues), post-punk (Killing Joke, Public Image Ltd), country rock (Steve Earle), folk rock (Frank Turner), dance (Leftfield), gothic rock (The Sisters of Mercy) and blues (Seasick Steve). A number of acts from outside the US and UK which may be less familiar to festival crowds are booked each year; in recent years these have included Tinariwen (Mali), Seeed (Germany), Katzenjammer (Norway), Dubioza kolektiv (Bosnia) and Hoffmaestro (Sweden). Traditionally, The Levellers open the festival with an acoustic set in the Big Top on Friday afternoon, and close it by headlining the main stage on Sunday, followed by a firework display.

== Stages ==
Panorama of the Main Stage in 2011

The first two festivals were held over two days (Saturday and Sunday) and utilised two stages, named the Main Stage and the Big Top. In 2005 it became a three-day festival with the addition of bands playing on the Friday, and has since expanded the number of stages. Between 2012 and 2018 there were six main stages; the two mentioned above, plus the Little Big Top, the Bimble Inn, the Bandstand and the Theatre Tent, the main stage and Big Top hosting the majority of established acts, with the Bimble Inn and Bandstand showcasing lesser known acts. The Little Big Top is primarily dance-oriented, whilst the Theatre tent provides theatre, cabaret, comedy and children's acts. In 2019 the Bandstand was removed to make way for a larger Theatre Tent, with some acoustic acts performing in the Fiddler's Arms.

== Facilities ==
Beautiful Days has the usual range of festival facilities. There are three bars - with Levellers-related names (Hope Tavern, Fiddler's Arms and Dirty Davey's), which are run by the local Otter Brewery, numerous food stalls, and a shop run by the village shop from nearby Talaton. There is a large children's area with activities and workshops run by the Majical Youth Theatre, along with child-friendly performances in the Theatre Tent. There are camping sections, including a family section and a disabled section, and a large area for camper vans and other live-in vehicles.

== Festival details ==
Year	Date	Main Stage Headliners	Big Top Headliners	Notes/Reference
2003	16-17 August	Lee "Scratch" Perry, The Levellers	Senser (Note: Although Senser were billed as the headliners, Mad Dog Mcrea played in the tent after them.), Justin Sullivan	
2004	21-22 August	The Stranglers, The Levellers	System 7, Show of Hands	
2005	19-21 August	Michael Franti & Spearhead, The Wonder Stuff, The Levellers	Chas & Dave, Steeleye Span, Billy Bragg	
2006	18-20 August	Killing Joke, Echo & the Bunnymen, The Levellers	Hayseed Dixie, Julian Cope, Alabama 3	
2007	17-19 August	Gogol Bordello, KT Tunstall, The Levellers	Skaville UK, Show of Hands, The Damned	
2008	15-17 August	Squeeze, Supergrass, The Levellers	Brakes, Salsa Celtica, Los Albertos	
2009	21-23 August	Hawkwind, The Pogues, The Levellers	Seth Lakeman, Swans in Flight, The Blockheads	
2010	20-22 August	The Wailers, James, The Levellers	Fairport Convention, Bellowhead, Shooglenifty	
2011	19-21 August	Big Audio Dynamite, Carter the Unstoppable Sex Machine, The Levellers	The Low Anthem, Oysterband, Salsa Celtica	
2012	17-19 August	Frank Turner and the Sleeping Souls, Public Image Ltd, The Levellers	Midlake, Seth Lakeman, Katzenjammer	
2013	16-18 August	Ocean Colour Scene, Primal Scream, The Levellers	Clannad, Headmix Collective, Roy Harper	
2014	15-17 August	Steve Earle and the Dukes, Seasick Steve, The Levellers	Tinariwen, Bellowhead, Devin Townsend	
2015	21-23 August	Happy Mondays, Dropkick Murphys, The Levellers	Freeborn John (Note: "Freeborn John" was Rev Hammer's musical story of John Lilburne, performed by Maddy Prior, Sean Lakeman, Kathryn Roberts, Justin Sullivan and members of the Levellers), Wilko Johnson, Ukulele Orchestra of Great Britain	
2016	19-21 August	Leftfield, James, The Levellers	Billy Bragg, The Damned (Note: The Damned were billed as the second band on the Big Top bill, but in the event played a much-extended headline set after Tricky pulled out at the last minute.), Treacherous Orchestra	
2017	18-20 August	Paul Heaton & Jacqui Abbott, Frank Turner and the Sleeping Souls, The Levellers	Therapy?, Hayseed Dixie, Alison Moyet	
2018	17-19 August	The Hives, Manic Street Preachers, The Levellers	Suzanne Vega, Calexico, Richard Thompson Electric Trio	
2019	16-18 August	Skunk Anansie, Ziggy Marley, The Levellers	Songhoy Blues, Hothouse Flowers, Steeleye Span	
2020	21-23 August	Travis, Flogging Molly, The Levellers	Hawkwind, Indigo Girls, Show of Hands	Cancelled due to COVID-19 pandemic
2021	20-22 August	Frank Turner and the Sleeping Souls, James, The Levellers	Hawkwind, The Lakeman Family Gathering (Note: The Lakeman Family Gathering consisted of Geoff Lakeman, Seth Lakeman, Kathryn Roberts & Sean Lakeman, Sam Lakeman and Cara Dillon. It was the first time they had all played on stage together in 25 years.), Van der Graaf Generator	
2022	19-21 August	Flogging Molly, The Specials, The Levellers	Beth Orton, The Imagined Village, Billy Bragg	
2023	18-20 August	Suede, Primal Scream, The Levellers	The Dead South, Indigo Girls, The Rock Orchestra	
2024	16-18 August	The Saw Doctors, Richard Ashcroft, The Levellers	Richard Hawley, Toyah Willcox & Robert Fripp, Fisherman's Friends	
2025	15-17 August	Frank Turner and the Sleeping Souls, Sex Pistols and Frank Carter, The Levellers	Pete Doherty, Mercury Rev, Fantastic Negrito	
2026	21-23 August	Super Furry Animals, Madness, The Levellers	The Proclaimers, The Divine Comedy, The Beta Band	

== Gallery ==
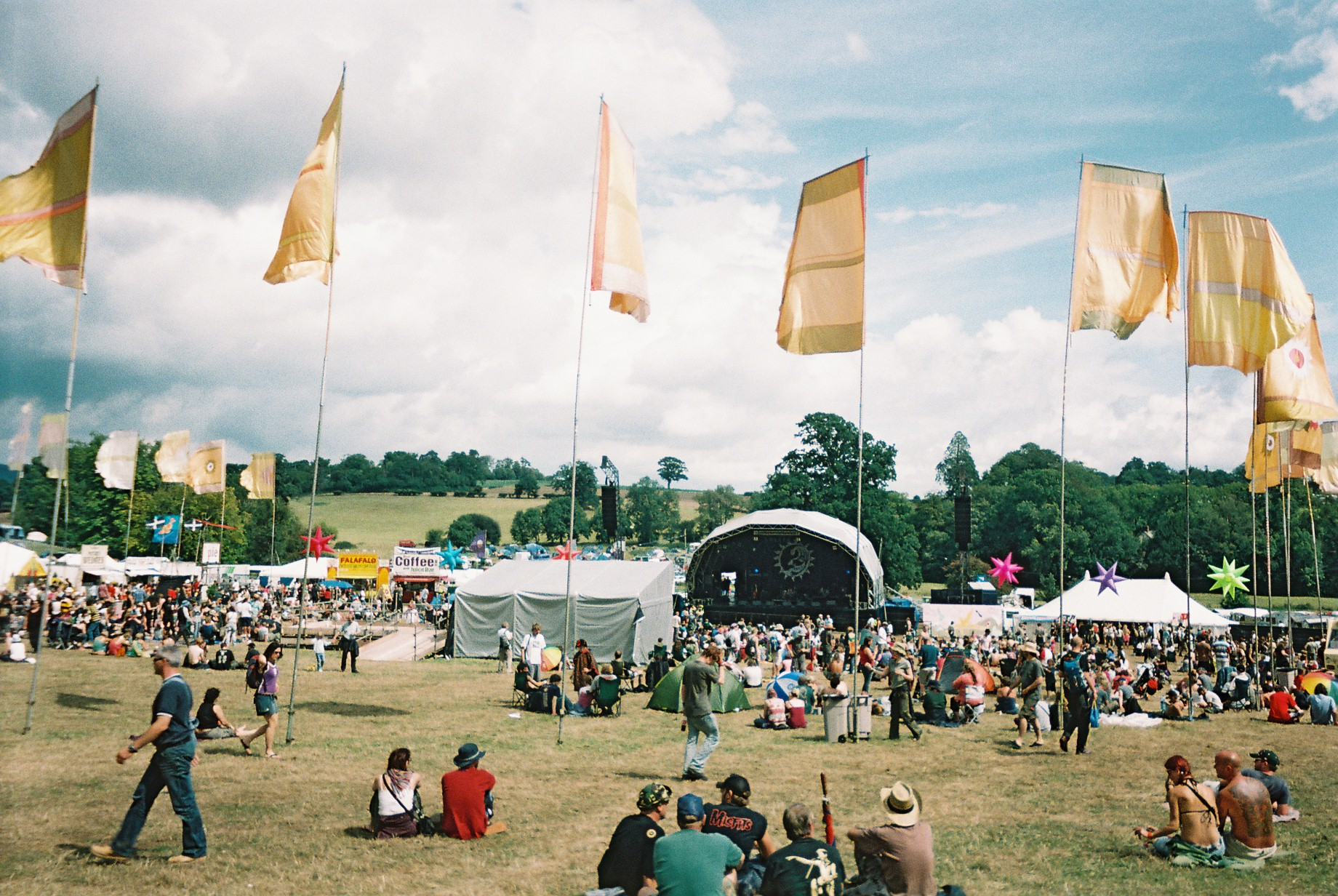
Main Stage, 2006

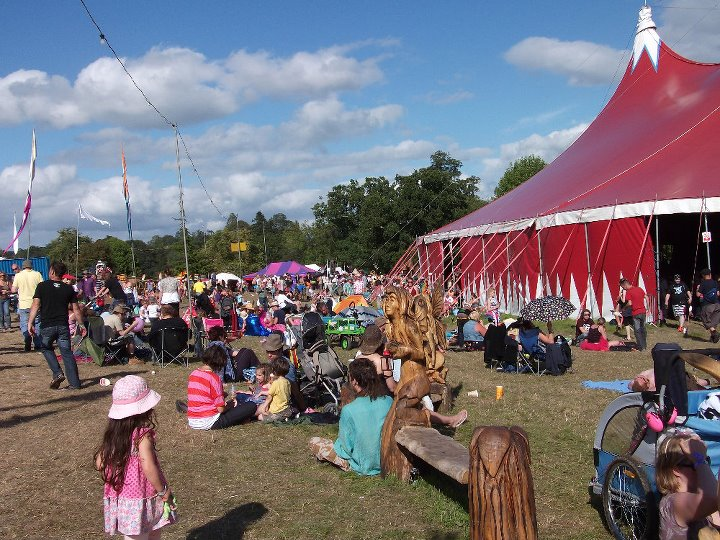
The Big Top stage, 2012

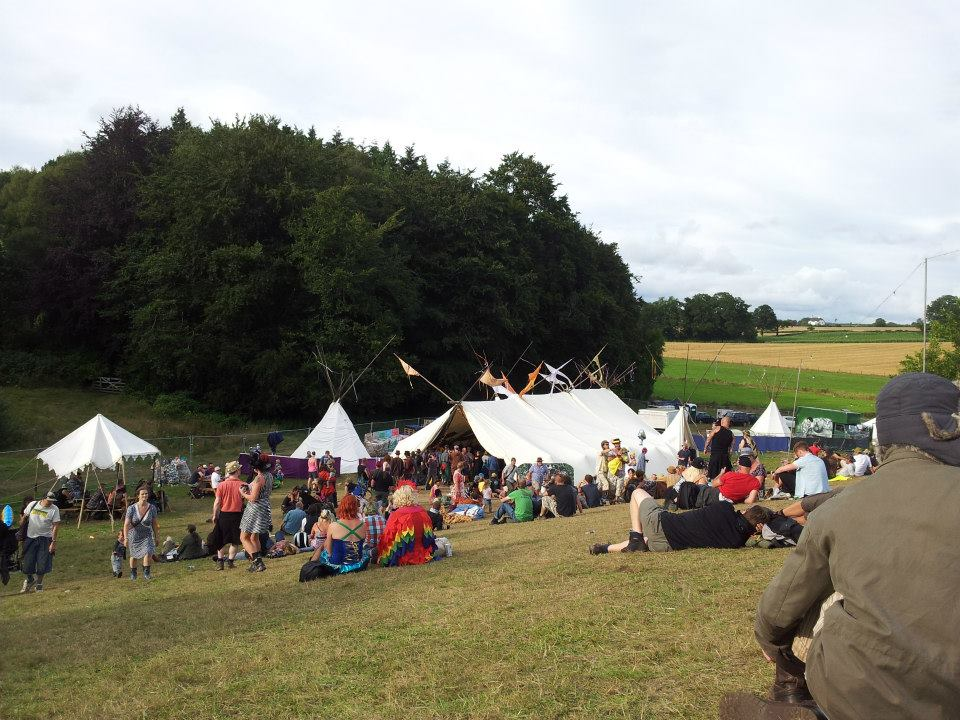
The Bimble Inn, 2013

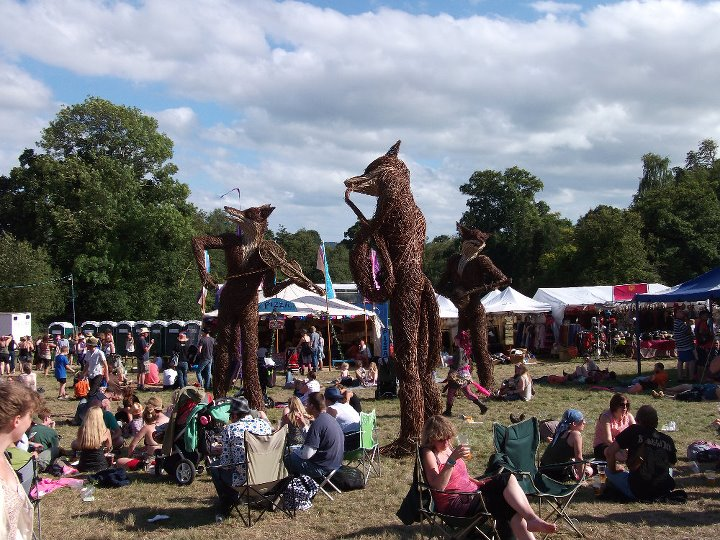
View of the festival near the Big Top, 2012

== See also ==
- Levellers (band)
