= The Punch Bowl (album) =

Studio album by Seth Lakeman
- Released: 2002
- Recorded: By Sean Lakeman at The Firs, Devon
- Genre: Folk
- Length: 28:34
- Label: iScream
- Producer: Sean Lakeman and Seth Lakeman

Seth Lakeman chronology
The Punch Bowl (2002)	Kitty Jay (2004)

The Punch Bowl is the debut studio album by Seth Lakeman, released in 2002.

== Track listing ==
No.	Title	Length
1.	"Garden of Grace" (inspired by Kathleen Partridge)	3:15
2.	"Image of Love" (Seth Lakeman)	3:11
3.	"April Eyes" (Seth Lakeman)	2:11
4.	"It's All Your World" (Seth Lakeman)	3:05
5.	"Send Yourself Away" (inspired by Kathleen Partridge)	2:45
6.	"Look Outside Your Window" (Seth Lakeman)	3:18
7.	"How Much" (Seth Lakeman)	2:22
8.	"The Punch Bowl" (traditional)	2:16
9.	"Scrumpy's Set" (Seth Lakeman)	2:47
10.	"Ye Mariners All" (traditional)	3:24
Total length:		28:54

== Personnel ==
- Seth Lakeman: vocals, tenor guitar, violin, viola
- Sean Lakeman: electric guitar, bass
- Sam Lakeman: piano
- Cara Dillon: vocals, whistle
- Kathryn Roberts: vocals
- Iain Goodall: drums, percussion
- Ben Nicholls: upright bass
- Geoff Lakeman: concertina
