= Freedom Fields =

Studio album by Seth Lakeman
- Released: 20 March 2006
- Studios: Piano Kitchen, Walkham Valley, Dartmoor
- Genre: Folk
- Length: 40:53 (first edition); 42:80 (second edition)
- Labels: iScream (first edition); Relentless (second edition)
- Producer: Sean Lakeman

Seth Lakeman chronology
Kitty Jay (2004)	Freedom Fields (2006)	Poor Man's Heaven (2008)

Alternative cover
- Re-release cover

Professional ratings
Review scores
Source	Rating
AllMusic	3.5/5 stars
musicOMH	4/5 stars
The Guardian	4/5 stars
The Times	4/5 stars
The Living Tradition	Favourable

Freedom Fields is an album by Seth Lakeman released twice in 2006. It is his third album as a principal performer. It is named after a park in Plymouth, England, where the Sabbath Day Fight during the Siege of Plymouth is commemorated.

== Track listing ==
=== First edition ===
The first edition (first pressing) includes a bonus disc of material. This edition was released 20 March 2006, under Lakeman's former record company, iScream.

==== Primary disc ====
1. "The Charmer" (Seth Lakeman) – 2:33
2. "Lady of the Sea" (Seth Lakeman) – 3:24
3. "Childe the Hunter" (traditional/arranged) – 4:18
4. "The White Hare" (traditional/arranged) – 3:30
5. "The Colliers" (traditional/arranged) – 3:14
6. "King and Country" (Seth Lakeman) – 4:27
7. "The Setting of the Sun" (traditional/arranged) – 4:01
8. "Take No Rogues" (Seth Lakeman) – 3:55
9. "1643" (Seth Lakeman) – 3:25
10. "The Riflemen of War" (Seth Lakeman) – 2:52
11. "The Band of Gold" (Seth Lakeman) – 3:14
12. "The Final Lot" (Seth Lakeman) – 1:53

==== Limited edition bonus disc ====
The second pressing of the first edition did not contain the bonus disc.

1. "Lady of the Sea (Live)"
2. "Ye Mariners All (Live)"

CD-ROM features

- "Kitty Jay" video
- "The White Hare" video
- "The White Hare" animation
- 2004 live tour video

=== Second edition ===
This edition was released on 21 August 2006 under Lakeman's new record company, Relentless. There are a number of differences between the first and second editions of the album. The track listing is more or less the same, but with a slightly different order and the addition of the bonus track "Send Yourself Away", from his first album, The Punch Bowl. Two of the tracks, "Lady of the Sea (Hear Her Calling)" and "The White Hare" have been remixed. In addition the second edition does not include the bonus disc and the cover design is different from the previous edition.

The second edition charted at #32 in the UK Top 40 and at #19 in the HMV Album Chart on 29 August 2006.

==== Second edition track listing ====
1. "Lady of the Sea (Hear Her Calling)" (Seth Lakeman) – 3:24 (UK 54 on 14 August 2006)
2. "Setting of the Sun" (traditional/arranged) – 4:01
3. "The White Hare (Album Version)" (traditional/arranged) – 3:30
4. "The Colliers" (traditional/arranged) – 3:14
5. "King and Country" (Seth Lakeman) – 4:27
6. "Childe the Hunter" (traditional/arranged) – 4:18
7. "Take No Rogues" (Seth Lakeman) – 3:55
8. "1643" (Seth Lakeman) – 3:25
9. "The Riflemen of War" (Seth Lakeman) – 3:52
10. "The Charmer" (Seth Lakeman) – 2:33
11. "The Final Lot" (Seth Lakeman) – 1:53
12. "Band of Gold" (Seth Lakeman) – 3:14

Bonus track
"Send Yourself Away" (inspired by Kathleen Partridge) – 2:45

=== Anniversary edition ===
In 2022 the 15th Anniversary edition was released, consisting of the second edition tracks and a bonus disk of demos and unreleased tracks and versions. Artwork was as for the second edition.

==== Anniversary bonus disk track listing ====
1. "The White Hare" (unreleased radio mix) – 3:26
2. "Childe the Hunter" (dub version) - 4:25
3. "Face of our Time" (demo / previously unreleased) - 2:59
4. "Patience & Time" (demo / previously unreleased) - 2:39
5. "The Charmer" (demo) - 2:32
6. "King & Country" (demo) - 4:03
7. "Setting of the Sun" (demo) - 3:34
8. "Take No Rogues" (demo) - 3:55
9. "Riflemen of War" (demo) - 2:23
10. "Final Lot" (demo) - 1:54
11. "Send Yourself Away" (demo) - 3:08
12. "Band of Gold" (demo) - 2:17

== Subject matter ==
Many of the songs are based on or inspired by real incidents.

- "The Colliers" : the Gresford Disaster
- "1643" : a battle that year at Plymouth, part of the First English Civil War
- "Riflemen of War" : a 1653 victory in the Anglo-Dutch Wars
- "Childe the Hunter" : The story of Childe the Hunter who died on Dartmoor

== Personnel ==
Main:

- Seth Lakeman – vocals, tenor guitar, violin
- Ben Nicholls – double bass, electric bass, banjo
- Sean Lakeman – guitars, producer, mix engineer
- Cormac Byrne – bodhran, percussion, drums
- Benji Kirkpatrick – bouzouki, backing vocals

Supporting:

- Steve Knightley – vocals
- John Jones – vocals
- Kathryn Roberts – vocals
- Cara Dillon – vocals
- DBG – vocals
- Bert Cleaver – pipe, tabor
- Jonny Crosbie – maracas

== Charts ==
Chart performance for Freedom Fields
Chart (2006)	Peak position
Scottish Albums (Official Charts)	32
UK Albums (Official Charts)	32
UK Independent Albums (Official Charts)	11

== Certifications ==
Certifications for Freedom Fields
Region	Certification	Certified units/sales
United Kingdom (BPI)	Silver	60,000^{^}
^{‡} Sales+streaming figures based on certification alone.
