= The Lakeman Brothers =

English folk music trio

The Lakeman Brothers were an English folk music trio, consisting of Sean Lakeman, Sam Lakeman and Seth Lakeman. They released one album, Three Piece Suite, in 1994 before forming the band Equation with Kate Rusby and Kathryn Roberts.

Seth has gone on to have success as a solo artist, particularly with his Mercury Music Prize-nominated second album Kitty Jay (2004). Sean has recorded two albums with Kathryn Roberts and tours with Seth. Sam performs with his wife Cara Dillon.
