= Hill of Thieves =

Studio album by Cara Dillon
- Released: 26 January 2009 (UK)
- Recorded: 2008
- Genre: Folk, rock, pop, Celtic
- Length: 45:06
- Label: Charcoal Records
- Producer: Sam Lakeman

Cara Dillon chronology
After The Morning (2006)	Hill of Thieves (2009)	A Thousand Hearts (2014)

Limited Edition / US release cover

Professional ratings
Review scores
Source	Rating
Hot Press	link
Maverick Country	5/5 stars
The Guardian	link
MusicOMH	link
The Mirror	link
Belfast Telegraph	link
CityLife	link
Uncut	link
Mojo	link
Irish Independent	link
Irish Times	link
Q	4/5 stars

Hill of Thieves is the fourth solo album by Irish folk singer Cara Dillon. It is her first full-length release on Charcoal Records, the label formed in 2008 with her musical partner and husband Sam Lakeman. The album was recorded and produced by Sam and first became available in October 2008 at their live concerts. It is also the first release since she gave birth to their twin boys Noah and Colm at 26 weeks, after going into labour onstage at the Swindon Arts Centre, UK. It has been the most successful of her first four albums in relation to chart performance, entering at No. 7 in the UK Indie Album Charts (see below for more.)

The album marks a return to a purer traditional production and arrangement style, with a significant absence of drums, electric guitar and bass, backing vocals & harmonies, and notably only one original composition. It features a range of guest musicians from the folk music scene, including Seth Lakeman and brother Sean, Brian Finnegan of Flook, Zoe Conway, Eamon Murray of Beoga, and John Smith. The album also features Dillon's core live band, comprising Sam Lakeman, Ed Boyd, and James O'Grady.

Many of the tracks released on this album had already become part of Dillon's live setlist between 2006 and 2008. "She Moved Through The Fair" first was performed on Dillon's After The Morning Tour (2006), and following the change in the live band line-up in 2007, "P Stands For Paddy" became another constant of the live sets. As well as this, "Spencer The Rover" and "False, False" were familiar songs from Dillon's 2001/2002 live set, which included Seth Lakeman on tenor guitar, violin, and backing vocals. Dillon first performed the title track, "The Hill of Thieves" in Brian Finnegan's The Singing Tree at the Old Fruitmarket, Glasgow, as part of Celtic Connections 2008.

== Background ==
Following the birth of her twin boys Colm and Noah Lakeman at 26 weeks and several months of uncertainty of their survival, Dillon and Sam Lakeman took a career break to adapt to their new roles as parents. Dillon states that with her children being the main priority, everything else took a back seat, and when they did return to making music, she wanted to record an album in the style of those albums that had comforted her during this troubled time, and these were albums she had grown up listening to, by Irish folk legends such as The Bothy Band, Planxty and Dolores Keane. Cara and Sam also wanted to reassert their artistic authority and freedom after deciding not to renew their contract with Rough Trade records and form Charcoal Records.

== Promotion & Marketing ==
Hill of Thieves was launched at three separate concerts in January 2009: The Royal Concert Hall, Glasgow (16 January), Black Box, Belfast (25 January) and Gibson Guitar Rooms, London (29 January). The latter performance was for industry and press representatives, but fans were given the opportunity to attend through a promotional competition on PLAY.com.

Dillon made two HMV in-store appearances (Grafton Street, Dublin on 24 January and Donegal Arcade, Belfast on 26 January). HMV also supported the album through a promotional offer of a limited edition slipcase of the album and had window displays of the album for the week of release. A TV commercial aired on Irish and British national television for the week of the album's release, featuring Dillon singing "Lament For Johnny" on a stage in an empty concert hall and "The Parting Glass" in a dimly lit cafe. The commercial was then uploaded to Dillon's YouTube channel for worldwide viewing. The official website online store offered 500 limited edition signed slipcases with the album.

As part of the promotional campaign, Dillon recorded a live session with Bob Harris on Radio 2 (17 January), and was also interviewed by Mike Harding on BBC Radio 2 on Wednesday 28 January. BBC Radio Ulster's Folk Club programme with Colum Sands aired the Glasgow launch concert in the Royal Concert Hall on Saturday 24 January.

== Awards ==
Hill Of Thieves won the Album of the Year award at the BBC Radio 2 Folk Awards in 2010 and received nominations for both Best Traditional Track and Folk Singer of the Year.

The song "The Hill Of Thieves" has since been voted as one of the Top Ten original songs to have come out of Northern Ireland by listeners of BBC Radio Ulster in the Great Northern Songbook, and was performed by the Ulster Orchestra in the Ulster Hall in August 2012.

"Jimmy Mó Mhile Stor" won Best Traditional Song at the 2010 Spiral Earth Awards.

== Track listing ==
All tracks are written by Dillon/Lakeman (track 1, second half of track 8), all songs thereafter traditional/arranged by Cara Dillon & Sam Lakeman.

No.	Title	Length
1.	"The Hill of Thieves"	4:30
2.	"Johnny, Lovely Johnny"	3:21
3.	"The Parting Glass"	3:20
4.	"Spencer the Rover"	4:05
5.	"False, False"	4:09
6.	"Jimmy Mo Mhíle Stór"	3:58
7.	"She Moved Through the Fair"	5:37
8.	"P Stands for Paddy (Lament for Johnny)"	6:13
9.	"The Verdant Braes of Skreen"	3:49
10.	"The Lass of Glenshee"	3:36
11.	"Fil, Fil a Run O"	2:33

== Personnel ==
=== Musicians ===
- Cara Dillon - vocals (all tracks); whistle (track 7)
- Sam Lakeman - guitar (tracks 1,2,4,6,8,10); piano (tracks 3,4,5,7,9,10); bodhran (track 8); percussion (tracks 1,4,8)
- James O'Grady - Uilleann pipes (tracks 1,2,6,8,); Low Whistle (track 7)
- Ben Nicholls - double bass (tracks 1,4,5,7,10)
- Zoe Conway - fiddle (tracks 2,5,8,10)
- Eamon Murray - bodhran (tracks 1,2,8,10)
- Brian Finnegan - Whistle (tracks 1,6)
- Seth Lakeman - vocals, tenor guitar, fiddle (track 4)
- John Smith - guitar (tracks 1,8); mandola (track 6)
- Sean Lakeman - guitar (track 1)
- James Fagan - bouzouki-guitar (tracks 2,8,10)
- Ed Boyd - guitar (track 8)

=== Production ===
- Sam Lakeman - producer, engineer, mixing
- Richard Evans - mixing
- Tony Cousins - mastering
- Rory Jay Willis - illustration
- Florian Zumfelde - artwork & design

== Chart performance ==
Chart (2009)	Peak position
Irish Albums Chart	93
UK Albums Chart	69
UK Indie Albums Chart	7
iTunes Folk Chart	1
Amazon World & Folk Chart	1
