= A Pilgrim's Tale =

Studio album by Seth Lakeman
- Released: 7 February 2020
- Length: 41:36
- Label: BMG

Seth Lakeman chronology
The Well Worn Path (2018)	A Pilgrim's Tale (2020)

Professional ratings
Aggregate scores
Source	Rating
Metacritic	72/100
Review scores
Source	Rating
The Guardian	3/5 stars
MusicOMH	4/5 stars

A Pilgrim's Tale is a studio album by English folk musician Seth Lakeman. It was released on 7 February 2020 under BMG Rights Management.

The album is inspired by the English ship Mayflower and its four-centuries since the first departure from the UK. English actor, Paul McGann, features on the album as narrator, alongside Cara Dillon, Benji Kirkpatrick and Ben Nicholls.

== Critical reception ==
A Pilgrim's Tale was met with generally favorable reviews from critics. At Metacritic, which assigns a weighted average rating out of 100 to reviews from mainstream publications, this release received an average score of 72, based on 4 reviews.

== Track listing ==
A Pilgrim's Tale track listing
No.	Title	Length
1.	"Watch Out"	3:37
2.	"Pilgrim Brother"	3:33
3.	"Westward Bound"	3:53
4.	"A Pilgrim's Warning"	4:45
5.	"Sailing Time"	3:00
6.	"The Great Iron Screw"	3:50
7.	"Dear Isle of England"	2:43
8.	"Saints and Strangers"	3:08
9.	"Foreign Man"	3:25
10.	"Bury Nights"	3:29
11.	"The Digging Song"	3:22
12.	"Mayflower Waltz"	2:51

== Charts ==
Chart performance for A Pilgrim's Tale
Chart (2020)	Peak position
Scottish Albums (Official Charts)	34
UK Albums (Official Charts)	39
UK Album Downloads (Official Charts)	48
UK Folk Albums (Official Charts)	9
UK Independent Albums (Official Charts)	4
