= Kitty Jay =

Kitty Jay may refer to:

- Kitty Jay, subject of Jay's Grave, supposedly the last resting place of a suicide victim
- Kitty Jay (album), a 2004 album by Seth Lakeman
