= Sweet Liberty (Cara Dillon album) =

Studio album by Cara Dillon
- Released: 22 September 2003 (UK); 23 March 2004 (worldwide)
- Recorded: 2002–2003
- Genres: Folk, rock, pop, Celtic
- Length: 55:29
- Label: Rough Trade
- Producers: Sam Lakeman; John Reynolds (track 4)

Cara Dillon chronology
Cara Dillon (2001)	Sweet Liberty (2003)	After the Morning (2006)

Singles from Sweet Liberty
- 1. "High Tide" Released: 2003; 2. "There Were Roses" Released: 2004; 3. "Everywhere" Released: 2004

Professional ratings
Review scores
Source	Rating
RTE	5/5 stars
Allmusic	4.5/5 stars
Artists Direct	4.5/5 stars
Hot Press	(7/10)

Sweet Liberty is the second solo album from folk artist Cara Dillon. It was recorded at their home studio in Frome, Somerset. Similar to her debut album, Sweet Liberty was produced and recorded by Sam Lakeman, her husband and musical partner. Additional production was by John Reynolds, who also plays drums on the album and mixed it along with Alan Branch.

The album features Dillon's popular version of Tommy Sands' folk song on sectarianism and The Troubles in Northern Ireland, "There Were Roses", which was recorded especially for Billy Connolly's TV series Billy Connolly's World Tour of England, Ireland and Wales. The popularity of Dillon's version of the song led to a BBC Radio 2 Folk Awards nomination for Tommy Sands in the Best Original Song category.

Promo 1-track singles of "High Tide", "There Were Roses" and "Everywhere" were sent to radio to encourage airplay of the album. A 4-track album sampler was also released prior to the release of the album, including "Black Is the Colour" and "Blue Mountain River" from Cara Dillon and "There Were Roses" and "Everywhere".

== Track listing ==
All songs traditional/arranged by Dillon/Lakeman, except: 3, 5, 9, 10 (written by Dillon/Lakeman); 1 (written by Dillon/Lakeman/Bigham); 4 (written by Sands); 11 (written by Moynihan/Woods)

1. "High Tide" – 3:40
2. "The Winding River Roe" – 4:28
3. "Everywhere" – 3:24
4. "There Were Roses" – 4:56
5. "Where Are You" – 5:15
6. "The Gem of the Roe" – 2:49
7. "Bonny Bonny" – 4:29
8. "Erin the Green" – 3:42
9. "Broken Bridges" – 6:44
10. "Falling Like a Star" – 4:36
11. "Standing on the Shore" – 4:46
12. "The Emigrant's Farewell" - 5:58

== Chart performance ==
Chart (2003)	Peak position
UK Albums Chart	116
Irish Albums Chart	34
UK Indie Albums Chart	40^
