= Western Approaches (Steve Knightley, Seth Lakeman and Jenna Witts album) =

2004 album by Steve Knightley, Seth Lakeman and Jenna Witts

Studio album by Steve Knightley, Seth Lakeman and Jenna
- Released: 27 September 2004
- Recorded: 2004
- Studio: The Piano Kitchen, Horrabridge, Devon
- Genre: Folk; English folk
- Length: 42:28
- Label: Hands on Music HMCD20
- Producer: Sean Lakeman

Steve Knightley chronology
Faith, Folk and Anarchy (2002)	Western Approaches (2004)	Cruel River (2007)

Western Approaches is an album by Steve Knightley, Seth Lakeman, and Jenna Witts. Jane Brace of Living Tradition was positive towards the album, noting it "grows on you, with its many musical twists and turns."

== Track listing ==
1. "Jigsaw" (Witts/Lakeman) – 2:03
2. "Surfers' Storm" (Witts) – 3:28
3. "The Crooked Man" (Knightley) – 4:52
4. "Captain's Court" (Lakeman) – 3:29
5. "Image Of Love" (Lakeman) – 3:38
6. "Track Of Words" (Knightley) – 3:20
7. "The Keeper" (Knightley) – 3:56
8. "Sand In Your Shoes" (Witts) – 3:25
9. "Ye Mariners All" (Trad. arr. Lakeman) – 3:15
10. "The Ballad Of Josie" (Lakeman) – 3:10
11. "If I Fall" (Knightley) – 4:10
12. "Dawn Wave" (Witts) – 3:40

== Personnel ==
- Steve Knightley - Vocals, Guitar, Mandocello, Cuatro, Bass
- Seth Lakeman - Vocals, Tenor Guitar, Fiddle
- Jenna - Vocals, Keyboards
- Iain Goodall - Percussion
