= Poor Man's Heaven =

Studio album by Seth Lakeman
- Released: 30 June 2008
- Recorded: 2007–8, Cornwall, UK
- Genres: Folk, folk rock
- Length: 40:48
- Label: Relentless
- Producers: Sean Lakeman, Seth Lakeman

Seth Lakeman chronology
Freedom Fields (2006)	Poor Man's Heaven (2008)	Hearts & Minds (2010)

Professional ratings
Review scores
Source	Rating
BBC	Favourable
Mojo magazine	(July 2008)
Q magazine	(July 2008)
The Guardian	3/5 stars
The Times	2/5 stars

Poor Man's Heaven is the fourth album by Seth Lakeman, released on 30 June 2008. An EP of the same name was also released in late 2007. Taking over 10 months to finalise, many of the tracks on the album had been part of Lakeman's live set since the second half of 2006, the initial tracks performed being "Poor Man's Heaven" and "Race to Be King", but this expanded towards the end of the tour, with new tracks continuing to be previewed throughout 2007 and into 2008. The album debuted at number 8 on the UK Albums Chart.

Many songs on the album have, by Lakeman's own admission, a rockier sound than his earlier more straightforward acoustic folk material. The transition into this sound could be argued to originate in the live versions of the Freedom Fields tracks from the respective tour, since many of them had a rockier element added (most notably on the chorus on 'The Colliers'). Indeed, Lakeman said that the decision to release the Poor Man's Heaven EP was partly to introduce this new direction to his listeners.

While acknowledging the shift to a rockier emphasis, Lakeman denies that the album is any less acoustic or more electric than his earlier material, pointing out that all the tracks are still almost exclusively performed on acoustic instruments.

== Track listing ==
1. "The Hurlers"
2. "Feather in the Storm"
3. "Crimson Dawn"
4. "Blood Red Sky"
5. "Solomon Browne"
6. "Cherry Red Girl"
7. "I'll Haunt You"
8. "Race to Be King"
9. "Poor Man's Heaven"
10. "Greed and Gold"
11. "Sound of a Drum" (a reworking of traditional song, The Unquiet Grave, premiered at the Quartz Visual Arts Festival, Taunton, 13 October 2007)
12. "Coppinger" (bonus track exclusive to iTunes UK)

Two of these tracks, 'Poor Man's Heaven' and 'Race To Be King', appear on the Poor Man's Heaven EP released in October 2007.

Tracks from the album can be listened to on BBC Online

== Personnel ==
Main:

- Seth Lakeman – vocals, violins, tenor guitar, viola
- Sean Lakeman - guitars, mandolin, harmonium, Producer
- Ben Nicholls – double bass, bass guitar, banjos, jaw harp, mandolin
- Andy Tween - drums, percussion

Additional Musicians:

- Ged Lynch - drums, percussion (tracks 2, 3, 5 and 6)
- Steve Knightley – vocals (tracks 1, 7 and 8), co-wrote tracks 4, 7, and 10
- David Rhodes - vocals (tracks 1, 7 and 8)
- Cormac Byrne - cajon (track 2), bodhran, shaker (tracks 5, 6 and 11)
- Richard Evans - slide guitar (track 2), acoustic guitar (track 3)
- Kathryn Roberts – vocals (tracks 3 and 6)
- Jake Watson - hurdy-gurdy (track 4)
- DBG – vocals (tracks 4 and 8)

== Reviews ==
Mojo Magazine, July 2008. "Seth Lakeman burns high octane non-stop. On this fourth album his voice is all muscularity and barely contained passions... Beneath a superficial folk-rock jigginess his band has a possibly Led Zeppelin related sense of how acoustic fiddle, guitar and double bass riffs can weigh heavy as metal."

Q Magazine, Andy Fyfe, July 2008. "The frantic fiddle remains dominant but guitars and drums crash all around it, Feather in a Storm even adding Jimmy Page-esque slide guitar. Lakeman's unwelcome mantle of folk's poster boy is unlikely to slip."

BBC Online, Sid Smith, 13 June 2008 "His song writing continues the gold-yielding formula of its predecessor with energetic strumalongs, voracious fiddles and a sparkling delivery"

The Observer, Neil Spencer, 15 June 2008. "a ripsnorter of a record that will slake the thirst of crowds roused by a season of his festival performances...Still, after four albums of much the same fayre, our West Country hero might usefully stray into fresh songwriting territory next time, and lose the roll call of cliches which demand that eyes are always burning, nights always dark and dawns crimson."

The Times, 27 June 2008, John Mulvey, "it is not his appropriation of rock music that is the problem, but the kind of rock music that he favours...uncomfortably reminiscent of records by David Gray and Damien Rice: curiously at once both overwrought and bland. "

The Guardian, 27 June 2008, Alexis Petridis "the album is at its best when it's at its most raw, when it stops worrying too much about charming those in charge of radio playlists and lets Lakeman's natural instinct for eeriness shine through."

== Subject matter ==
As with much of his music, the theme of songs dealing with darker topics and real-life incidents continues on this album. Lakeman describes "I'll Haunt You" (written with Steve Knightley) as being 'probably the darkest material either of us [sic] have ever written'. There is also a strong, though not exclusive, theme of songs about seafaring and the coast, again continuing a trend from much of his earlier material. "Solomon Browne" for example, another key track, is about the Penlee lifeboat disaster in 1981 in which 16 people lost their lives.

In an interview for fRoots magazine in March 2008, Lakeman gave more information on some of the tracks:

"Feather in a Storm" is based on the story of the Danish pirate John Coppinger who, legend has it, planted false beacons on coastal rocks to lure ships to disaster while his gang lay in wait to salvage the booty.

"The Hurlers" is about a Bodmin legend about a local priest turning local men into stone having caught them playing hurling, when they should have been in church.

"Blood Red Sky" is a modern retelling of the old English ballad of Reynardine.

Not all the tracks are so dark. Of "Crimson Dawn" Lakeman is quoted as saying, "It's about a guy who goes out on a lifeboat and among the ones he saves is a beautiful woman, but her hair gets tangled up in the lifeboat rigging. He chops her hair off with an axe and they end up getting married and live happily ever after. That's a nice story, isn't it?".

== Charts ==
Chart performance for Poor Man's Heaven
Chart (2008)	Peak position
Scottish Albums (Official Charts)	28
UK Albums (Official Charts)	8

== Certifications ==
Certifications for Poor Man's Heaven
Region	Certification	Certified units/sales
United Kingdom (BPI)	Silver	60,000^{^}
^{‡} Sales+streaming figures based on certification alone.
