= Upon a Winter's Night =

Studio album by Cara Dillon
- Released: 18 November 2016
- Genres: Folk, holiday, Celtic
- Label: Charcoal Records
- Producer: Sam Lakeman

Cara Dillon chronology
A Thousand Hearts (2014)	Upon a Winter's Night (2016)	Wanderer (2017)

Upon a Winter's Night is the sixth solo album and first Christmas album by folk artist Cara Dillon. The album, produced by Dillon's musical partner and husband Sam Lakeman, features eight arrangements of traditional carols and three original compositions. The titular track “Upon a Winter's Night” was written by Sam Lakeman and the couple's son, Noah, while “Standing by My Christmas Tree” and “Mother Mary” were written by Dillon and Lakeman.

The track “O Holy Night” is an a cappella duet featuring Dillon's sister Mary Dillon, who is also a folk singer.

== Track listing ==
1. "Upon a Winter's Night"
2. "The Wexford Carol"
3. "Infant Holy, Infant Lowly"
4. "The Holly and the Ivy"
5. "O Come, O Come Emmanuel"
6. "Standing by My Christmas Tree"
7. "O Holy Night"
8. "Rug Muire Mac Do Dhia"
9. "The Darkest Midnight"
10. "The Huntsman"
11. "Mother Mary"
