= Tales from the Barrel House =

Studio album by Seth Lakeman
- Released: 18 November 2011
- Genre: Folk
- Label: Honour Oak Records
- Producer: Seth Lakeman

Seth Lakeman chronology
Hearts & Minds (2010)	Tales from the Barrel House (2011)	Word of Mouth (2014)

Tales from the Barrel House is the sixth solo music album by Seth Lakeman released on 18 November 2011.

== Track listing ==
1. "More Than Money"
2. "Blacksmiths Prayer"
3. "The Watchmaker's Rhyme"
4. "Hard Road"
5. "The Sender"
6. "Salt From Our Veins"
7. "Brother of Penryn"
8. "Apple of His Eye"
9. "Higher Walls"
10. "The Artisan"
