= A Thousand Hearts =

Studio album by Cara Dillon
- Released: 19 May 2014
- Genre: Folk, Celtic, indie pop
- Label: Charcoal
- Producer: Sam Lakeman

Cara Dillon chronology
Hill of Thieves (2009)	A Thousand Hearts (2014)	Upon a Winter's Night (2016)

A Thousands Hearts is the fifth solo album by Irish folk singer Cara Dillon. It was the second release on her own label Charcoal Records and was released in partnership with Sony Music. A Thousand Hearts features more traditional production and arrangements than her first three albums. The album contains traditional songs (including two sung in Irish Gaelic) as well as two modern covers, "Shotgun Down the Avalanche" by Shawn Colvin and "River Run". The album was produced by Sam Lakeman, Dillon's musical partner and husband.

"Shotgun Down the Avalanche" and "Bright Morning Star" were recorded for the Transatlantic Sessions 6 in 2013. Both tracks were also shot as promotional music videos.

== Track listing ==
All tracks traditional/arranged by Cara Dillon & Sam Lakeman except 5 (Shawn Colvin/John Leventhal) and 6 (Beth Sorrentino)

1. "Jacket So Blue"
2. "Bright Morning Star"
3. "My Donald"
4. "Moorlough Mary"
5. "Shotgun Down the Avalanche"
6. "River Run"
7. "Éirigh Suas a Stóirín"
8. "Eighteen Years Old"
9. "Táimse Im' Chodladh"
10. "The Shores of Lough Bran"
11. "As I Roved Out"
