= Penlee lifeboat disaster =

Disaster at sea off Cornwall (1981)

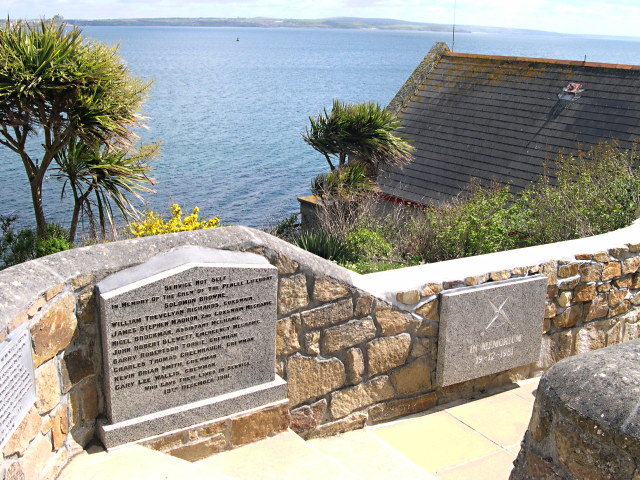
- Penlee Lifeboat Memorial
- Date: 19 December 1981 (evening)
- Location: Mount's Bay, Cornwall, England; 50.0523°N 5.5774°W
- Deaths: 8 Solomon Browne lifeboat crew lost 8 Union Star crew and passengers lost

The Penlee lifeboat disaster occurred on 19 December 1981 off the coast of Cornwall, England. The Royal National Lifeboat Institution (RNLI) lifeboat Solomon Browne, based at the Penlee Lifeboat Station near Mousehole, went to the aid of the vessel Union Star after its engines failed in heavy seas. After the lifeboat had rescued four people, both vessels were lost with all hands. Sixteen people died, including eight volunteer lifeboatmen.

== MV Union Star ==
The MV Union Star, a mini-bulk carrier and coaster registered in Dublin, had sailed from IJmuiden in the Netherlands on 17 December with a cargo of fertiliser for its maiden voyage to Arklow, Ireland. It was carrying a crew of five: Captain Henry Morton, Mate James Whittaker, Engineer George Sedgwick, Crewman Anghostino Verressimo and Crewman Manuel Lopes. Also on board were Morton's wife Dawn and his teenage stepdaughters Sharon and Deanne, who had been picked up at an unauthorised call at Brightlingsea in Essex.

Near the south coast of Cornwall, 8 miles (13 km) east of the Wolf Rock, the ship's engine failed. The crew was unable to restart them, but did not make a mayday call. Assistance was offered by a tug, the Noord Holland, under the Lloyd's Open Form salvage contract; Morton initially refused the offer, but accepted after consulting the ship's owners. By this time, however, the weather had deteriorated dramatically. Waves up to 60 feet (18 m) high were battering the Union Star, while winds gusting at up to 90 knots (100 mph; 170 km/h)—hurricane force 12 on the Beaufort scale—were blowing the powerless ship across Mount's Bay towards the rocks of Boscawen Cove, near Lamorna.

== Rescue attempts ==
=== FAA Sea King helicopter ===
As the ship was close to shore, the Coastguard at Falmouth summoned a Royal Navy Sea King helicopter from 820 Naval Air Squadron (who were providing cover for 771 Naval Air Squadron), RNAS Culdrose. It used the call sign "Rescue 80" during the mission. The aircraft was flown by LCDR Russell Smith (who was on secondment from the United States Navy), assisted by Lt Steve Marlow, S/Lt Kenneth Doherty and Leading Aircrewman Martin Kennie of the Royal Navy. They were unable to winch anyone off the ship due to the violent winds.

=== RNLB Solomon Browne ===
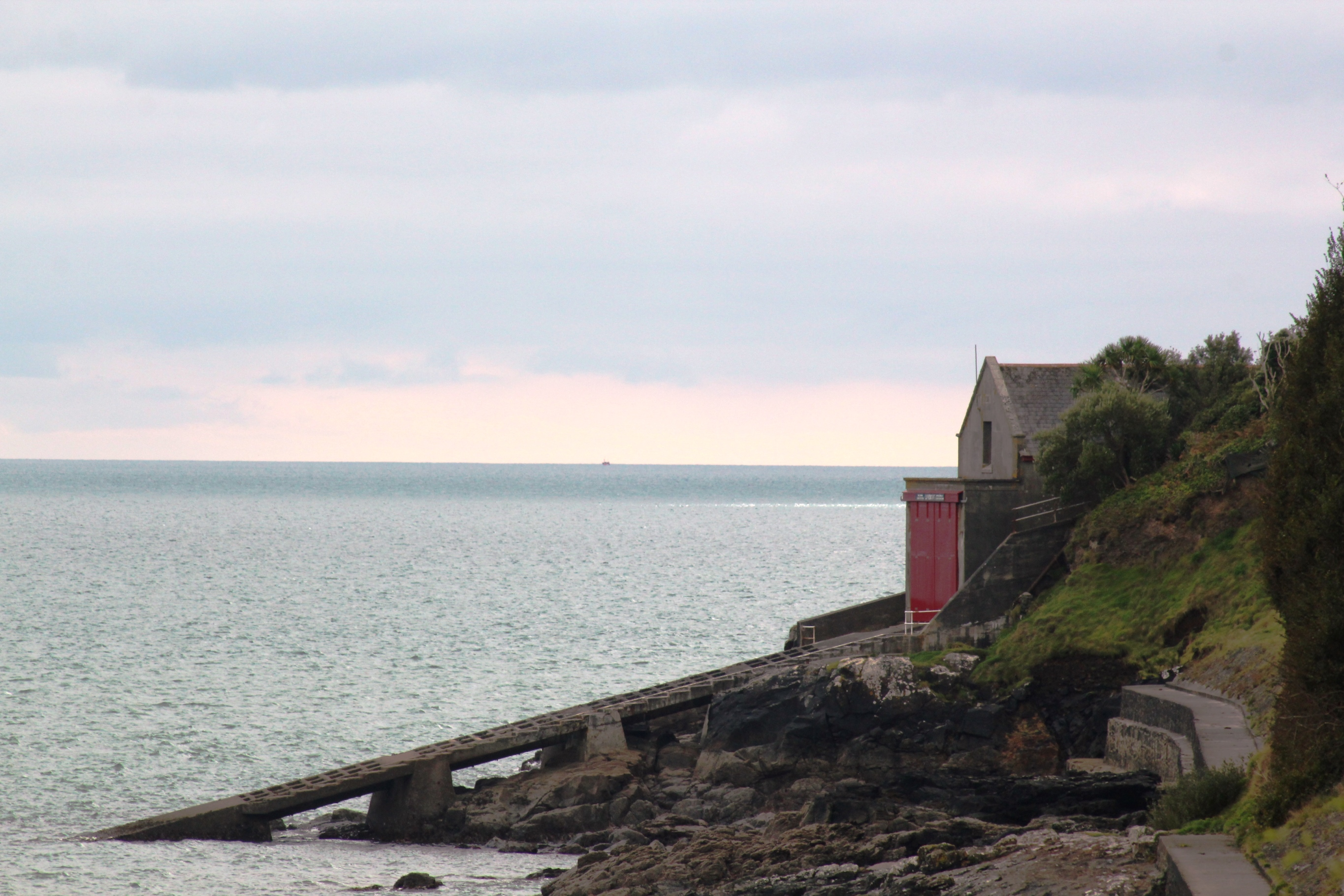
The Penlee Lifeboat Station, from which Solomon Browne was launched.

The Coastguard had difficulties contacting the secretary of the nearest lifeboat station, Penlee Lifeboat Station at Mousehole on the west side of the bay. They eventually contacted Coxswain Trevelyan Richards, and asked him to put the lifeboat on standby in case the helicopter rescue failed. He summoned the lifeboat's volunteer crew, and picked seven men to accompany him in the lifeboat: Second Coxswain and Mechanic Stephen Madron, Assistant Mechanic Nigel Brockman, Emergency Mechanic John Blewett, and crewmembers Charlie Greenhaugh, Kevin Smith, Barrie Torrie and Gary Wallis. Richards refused to take Nigel's son, Neil, as he would not take two members of the same family.

The lifeboat was the RNLB Solomon Browne, a wooden 47-foot (14 m) Watson-class boat built in 1960 and capable of 9 knots (17 km/h). The lifeboat was named after Quaker Solomon Browne of Landrake following a bequest presented by his daughters. It launched at 8:12 pm and headed out through the storm to the drifting Union Star. After it had made several attempts to get alongside, including one which resulted in the lifeboat briefly landing on the Union Star's deck, four people managed to jump across to the Solomon Browne. Nigel Brockman, operating the lifeboat's radio, then called Falmouth Coastguard to report what had happened:

"Falmouth Coastguard, Falmouth Coastguard, this is Penlee Lifeboat calling Falmouth Coastguard...We've got four men off...hang on, we've got four off at the moment...male and female. There's two left on board..."

The transmission then abruptly cut off as Brockman was mid-sentence. Follow-up calls from Falmouth Coastguard to the Solomon Browne went unanswered; Brockman's radio call would be the last anyone heard from either the lifeboat or the Union Star.

Lt Cdr Smith USN, the pilot of the rescue helicopter, later reported that:

The greatest act of courage that I have ever seen, and am ever likely to see, was the penultimate courage and dedication shown by the Penlee [crew] when it manoeuvred back alongside the casualty in over 60 ft breakers and rescued four people shortly after the Penlee had been bashed on top of the casualty's hatch covers. They were truly the bravest eight men I've ever seen, who were also totally dedicated to upholding the highest standards of the RNLI.

=== Other lifeboats ===
Lifeboats were summoned from Sennen Cove, The Lizard, and St Mary's to try and help their colleagues from Penlee. The Sennen Cove Lifeboat found it impossible to make headway round Land's End. The Lizard Lifeboat found a serious hole in its hull when it finally returned to its slipway after a fruitless search.

== Aftermath ==
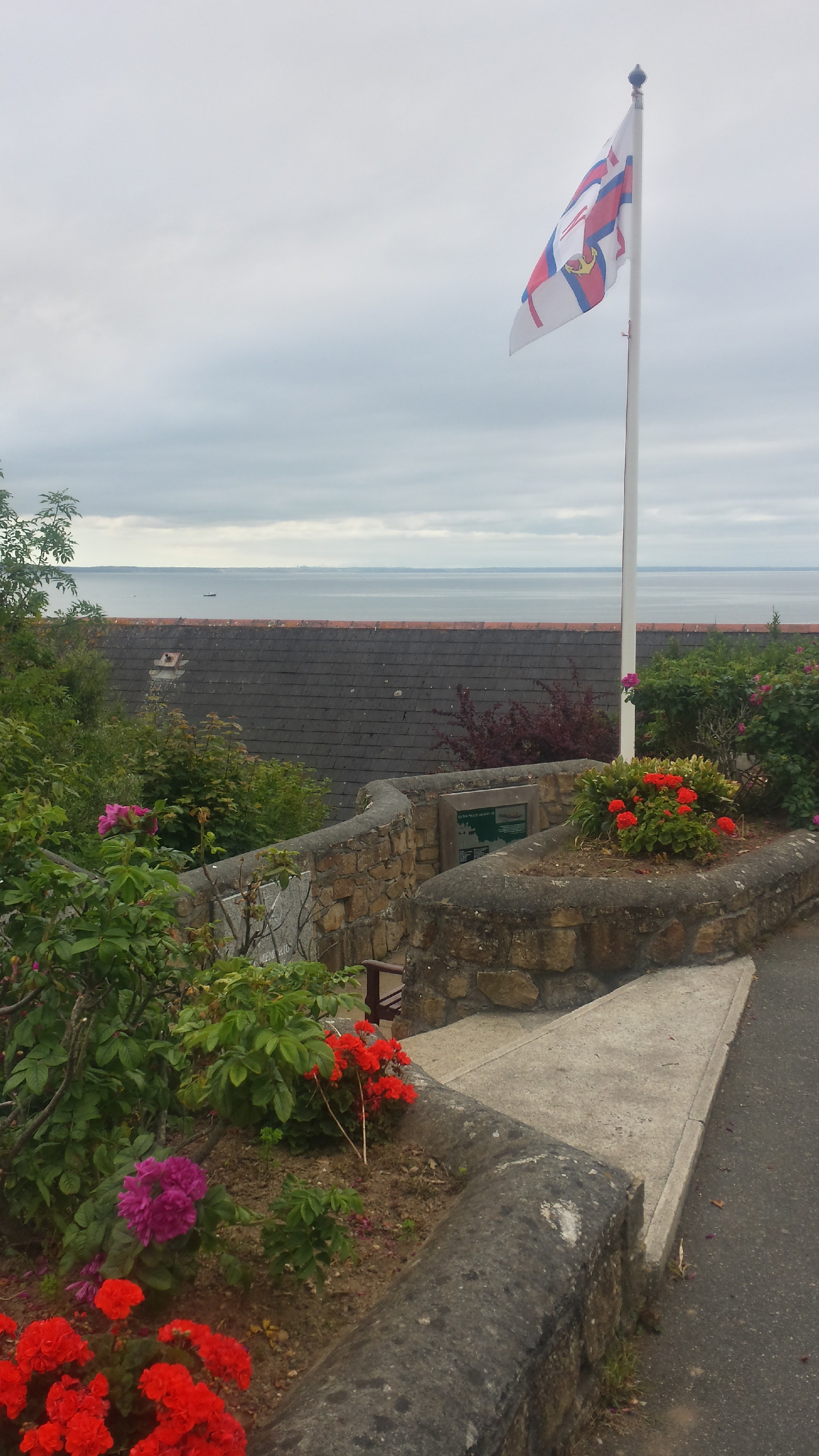
The memorial garden at Penlee.

In the aftermath of the disaster, wreckage from the Solomon Browne was found along the shore, and the Union Star lay capsized onto the rocks, west of Tater Du Lighthouse. Only eight of the sixteen bodies - four each from the lifeboat and the Union Star - were ever recovered.

The inquiry into the disaster determined that the loss of the Union Star and its crew was because of:

1. the irreparable failure of the ship's engines due to contamination of fuel by sea water while off a dangerous lee shore;
2. the extreme severity of the weather, wind and sea; and
3. the capsize of the vessel on or shortly after stranding.

The loss of the Solomon Browne was:

in consequence of the persistent and heroic endeavours by the coxswain and his crew to save the lives of all from the Union Star. Such heroism enhances the highest traditions of the Royal National Lifeboat Institution in whose service they gave their lives.

Coxswain Trevelyan Richards was posthumously awarded the RNLI's gold medal, while the remainder of the crew were all posthumously awarded bronze medals. The station itself was awarded a gold medal service plaque. The disaster prompted a massive public appeal for the benefit of the village of Mousehole which raised over £3 million (equivalent to £11.6 million in 2025), although there was an outcry when the government tried to tax the donations.

Charlie Greenhaugh, who was also the landlord of the Ship Inn on the quayside in Mousehole, had turned on the village's Christmas lights just two nights before the disaster. The lights were left off for three days after the storm but Greenhaugh's widow, Mary, asked for them to be repaired and lit again. The village has been lit up each December since then, but on the anniversary of the disaster they are turned off at 8:00 pm for an hour as an act of remembrance. A plaque was also erected on the Ship Inn on behalf of the tenants, managers, directors and employees of the St Austell Brewery, the pub's owner.

Within a day of the disaster enough people from Mousehole had volunteered to form a new lifeboat crew. In 1983 a new lifeboat station (still known as 'Penlee') was opened nearby at Newlyn where a faster, larger boat could be kept moored afloat in the harbour. Neil Brockman later became the coxswain of the station's Severn-class lifeboat. The old boathouse at Penlee Point with its slipway is kept the same as it was when the lifeboat launched and a memorial garden was created beside it in 1985 to commemorate the crew of the Solomon Browne. In 2023 the boathouse, slipway, memorial garden, retaining and boundary walls were designated together a Grade II listed building. As well as architectural interest the reasons for designation cited the association with the Solomon Browne.

== Cultural references ==
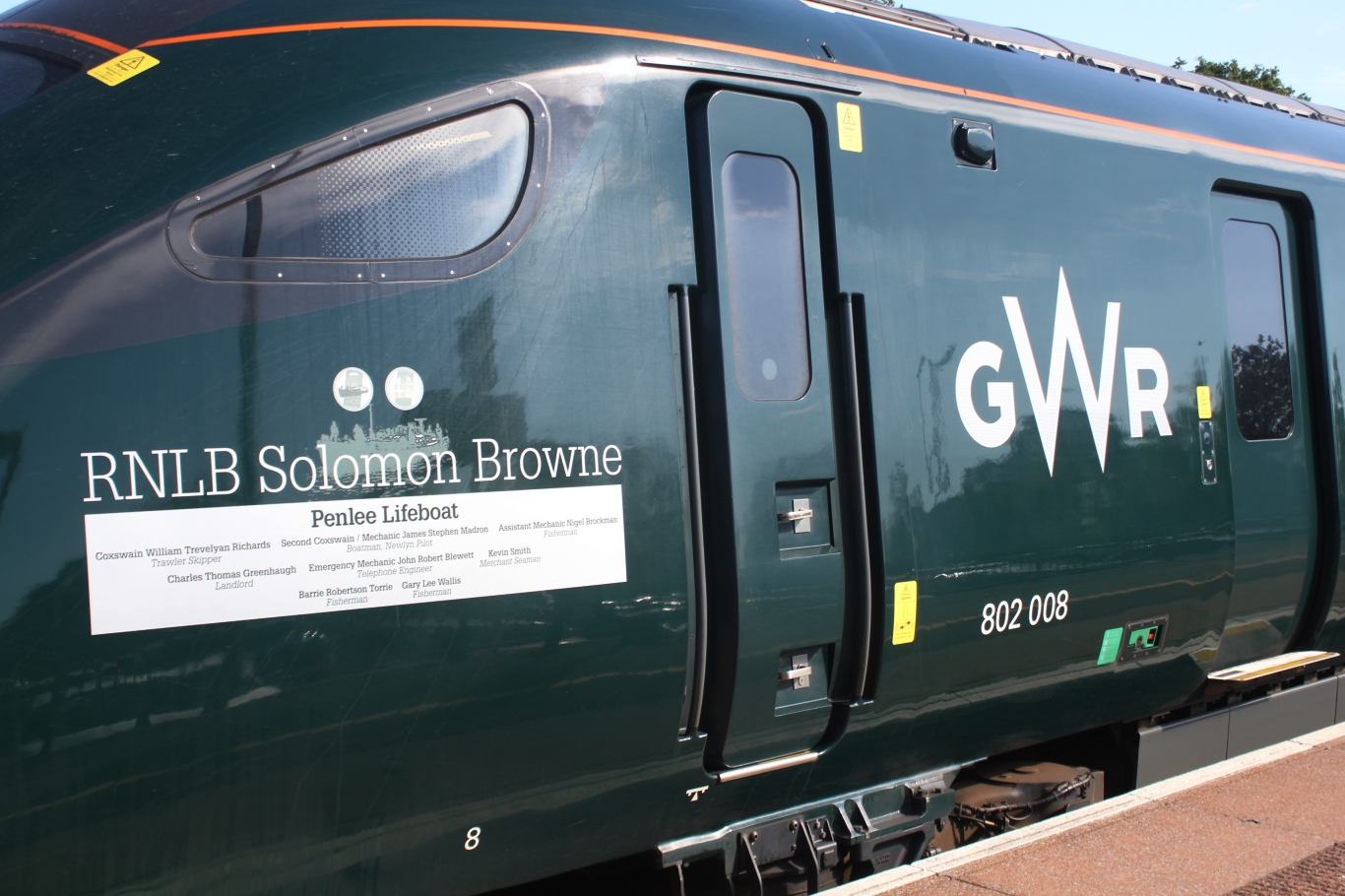
GWR train 802008 RNLB Solomon Browne carries the names of the crew

The disaster has been the subject of several songs. English folk singer and songwriter Seth Lakeman wrote the song "Solomon Browne", which appears on his 2008 album Poor Man's Heaven. The CD reissue of the Anthony Phillips' album Invisible Men includes "The Ballad of Penlee" about the incident. Paul Sirman, a Kentish folk artist who specialises in songs of the sea recorded the incident in his song "Solomon Browne" which appears on his album One For All. Kimber's Men, a sea shanty group, recorded "Don't Take The Heroes" on their CD of the same name. Local band Bates Motel based in Hayle included a song "The Last Wave", about the disaster on their album Anorak.

In 2015, Cornish-American singer-songwriter Jim Wearne's album Half Alive in Wallaroo featured the track "The Boys of Penlee", written by fellow Cornish bard Craig Weatherhill, and featuring Weatherhill playing mellotron whose haunting choir sound ends the song with the line "For those in peril on the sea", from the popular sailors' hymn. Simon Dobson wrote a test piece for brass band entitled "Penlee" about the incident.

Neil Oliver devotes a chapter to the disaster in his 2008 book Amazing Tales for Making Men out of Boys. It also features in his book The Story of The British Isles in 100 Places.

Great Western Railway named Class 802 unit 802008 RNLB Solomon Browne in a ceremony at Penzance TMD on 13 April 2019.

To commemorate the 40th anniversary, a docudrama, Solomon Browne, written and narrated by Callum Mitchell and featuring recorded testimonies from relatives of some of the lifeboat crew, was broadcast on BBC Radio 4 on 20 December 2021.

Also in December 2021 Mousehole FC also opened their new stand named "The Solomon Browne Stand".

For the 2025 Christmas special of Mortimer & Whitehouse: Gone Fishing, Bob and Paul visit Mousehole and go fishing from the boat of one of the victim's sons. They discuss the disaster.
