= EFestivals =

eFestivals

- The eFestivals website (21 June 2009) viewed in Mozilla Firefox
- Website type: Music festival listings and online community
- Available in: English
- Owner: NRG Internet Ltd
- Creator: Neil Greenway
- Website: http://www.efestivals.co.uk/
- Registration: Optional
- Launched: 2000

eFestivals is a website listing music festivals; hosting information on line-ups, interviews, photographs and live reviews.

The website boasts an active discussion board with over 225,000 registered users, which now runs on a separate server from the main website due to its popularity. A 'gold membership' is available for £18 per annum, which prevents third party websites from being displayed while using the site.

In May 2019, eFestivals launched an appeal for donations to help cover the website's running costs and to secure the future of the website.

== History ==
The website was launched in 1998 as "The Original Glastonbury Website", and was adopted by Glastonbury Festival as the official website for the 1999 event. In 2000, eFestivals was launched to cater for multiple festivals (over 200 were listed in 2006), and has been cited as bringing attention to smaller-scale festivals. in 2023 the company that owned efestivals (NRG Internet LTD ) and its assets was sold to PURE MATTER MEDIA GROUP LTD, and founder Neil ~Greenway ended his involvement of running the websites.

In 2007, sister website eGigs.co.uk was first registered, which mirrors the format of eFestivals but relates to individual gigs rather than festivals.
