= If I Prove False =

Single by Cara Dillon, John Smith
- A-side: "If I Prove False"
- B-side: "If I Prove False (Live DVD version)"
- Released: May 19, 2008
- Recorded: 2008
- Genre: Folk, pop
- Length: 4:08
- Label: Charcoal Records
- Songwriter(s): traditional
- Producer(s): Sam Lakeman

Cara Dillon, John Smith singles chronology
"This Time/I Wish You Well" (2006)	"If I Prove False" (2008)

"If I Prove False" is a single by folk artist Cara Dillon. The single was released in conjunction with the release of her first full-length DVD The Redcastle Sessions. The song became a live favourite for the singer during 2007 when she toured with guitarist and singer John Smith. The single is a duet with him, and is a traditional song. The single received airplay on national and regional radio stations, and was on the RTÉ Radio 1 playlist and BBC Radio Ulster playlist. The single is Dillon's first release under her own record label, "Charcoal Records".

== Track listing ==
1. If I Prove False
2. If I Prove False (live DVD version)

== Different versions ==
In The Redcastle Sessions performance of this song, as well as when performed live, Cara sings the following lines towards the end of the song, followed by the chorus, sung by her alone:

Night wind go tell my sailor man

I'll be waiting in the day

I long to feel his warm embrace

In this cold and hardy year

The song is derived from a traditional song that is known under various titles, including "The Lass of Roch Royale", "Oh Who Will Shoe My Foot", "O, Who Will Shoe your Pretty Little Foot" and "The False True Lover".

== Other recordings ==
- "The Lass of Loch Royale (If I Prove False)" - Kelly Joe Phelps
- "If I Prove False to Thee" - Bohola
- Evan Rachel Wood in the movie A Case of You

== Personnel ==
- Cara Dillon - vocals
- John Smith - vocals, guitar
- Stuart Duncan - fiddle
