= Equation (band) =

- Origin: Devon, England
- Genres: Folk rock, Celtic music
- Labels: Warner Music WEA, Rough Trade, Putumayo World Music, IScream
- Past members: Seth Lakeman; Sam Lakeman; Cara Dillon; Kathryn Roberts; Sean Lakeman; Kate Rusby; Darren Altman; Darren Edwards

Equation were a British, young Devon-based folk supergroup formed in 1995, which combined the core talents of the Lakeman Brothers with Kathryn Roberts and Kate Rusby, later replaced for a spell by Cara Dillon. The name of the band refers to the initials of the band members' names, KR2 + SL3.

Their first single "He Loves Me" was originally released in 1996 on the Blanco y Negro-WEA label and was followed by four studio albums.

The Times reviewed their first album release Hazy Daze. in 1998, scoring 7/10 and giving a favourable comparison to Fairport Convention.

== Discography ==
=== Albums ===
- Hazy Daze (1998, Blanco Y Negro-WEA) - (Putumayo US)
- The Lucky Few (1998, Black Burst Records - Rough Trade) - (Putumayo US)
- First Name Terms (2002, IScream Music)
- Return to Me (Recorded 1995/1996 - Released 2003, Rough Trade Records)

=== Singles and EPs ===
- In Session (1995)
- He Loves Me (1996)
- The Dark Ages EP (2000)
