= Mad Dog Mcrea =

British folk band

- Mad Dog Mcrea live at The Wharf in Tavistock.

Background information
- Origin: Plymouth, Devon, England
- Genres: Folk rock, Celtic, gypsy jazz
- Labels: God Dam Records
- Members: Michael Mathieson; Dan Crimp; Kit French; Nicki Powell; Jon Stopporton; Pete Chart
- Past members: Dave Podmore; Alex Beal; Jimi Galvin; Olivia Dunn; Graham Anderson; Damien Scarr; Aaron Catlow; Pete Chart; Ru Hewitt; Duncan Hind; Misha Law; Katie De Grace; Carl Arnold; Stuart Wyatt; Terry Williams; John Austin; Chrissie Moss; Simon Mitchinson; Dave Whatmore; Pete Healy; Andy Ancrum; Mark Tucker
- Website: www.maddogmcrea.co.uk

Mad Dog Mcrea are a British folk band from Plymouth, Devon, England, their music blends a mixture of folk rock, pop, gypsy jazz and bluegrass.

In 2011 Mad Dog released their album The Whirling Dervish, and this won the band Best Album of the Year at the South West Music Awards 2011.

BBC Radio 2's Mike Harding heard the band sometime in 2011 and got in touch with Mad Dog to ask them to send over CDs, since then he has played them several times on the BBC. He is quoted as saying "one of the most exciting discoveries of 2011" notwithstanding the fact that the band have three albums under their belt and many years of performance behind them.

The band are friends of Seth Lakeman and entertained fellow musicians, friends and guests at his wedding celebrations in 2012

In addition to their usual local and national gigs, the official Mad Dog 'Happy Bus' tour of the UK took place in November 2012 and featured friend Cosmo Jarvis in support (who penned Waiting on the Hill from The Whirling Dervish).

One career highlight for the band was performing The Rocky Road to Dublin with Mick Jagger on tambourine at a charity garden party for The Prince's Trust

In 2013, Mad Dog Mcrea also performed on the Avalon Stage as part of the 2013 Glastonbury Festival

== Discography ==
Year	Album title	Track listing
2002	Away with the Fairies: Released: 2002; Formats: CD	1. Curly Wurly Jig; 2. Raggle Taggle Gypsy; 3. Couldn't Have Come At A Better Time; 4. Turning Away; 5. O Keefe's Slide; 6. Black Fly; 7. Devil Went Down to Georgia; 8. The Bear Necessities; 9. Rocky Road To Dublin; 10. Hava Na Gila
2006	Sophisticated Hat Manoeuvres: Released: CD - 2006; download - 7 June 2011; Label: God Dam Records; Formats: CD, download	1. Country Boy; 2. Am I Drinking Enough; 3. The Jolly Beggarman; 4. Gagged & Bound; 5. The Butterfly; 6. Back In The Nick O Time; 7. Coolie's Reel; 8. Dribble On The Pillow; 9. Whiskey Moon; 10. The Happy Bus
2011	The Whirling Dervish: Released: 31 May 2013; Label: God Dam Records; Formats: CD, download	1. Climb A Hill; 2. Stupid Things; 3. Devil's Cauldron; 4. Rose in the Heather/Hanley's Tweed; 5. Man Was A Hero; 6. Bold Belinda; 7. Waiting On The Hill; 8. Duck Street; 9. Bee's Wing; 10. Sharav; 11. Tempus Fugit; 12. The Which
2014	Alive EP: Released: 10 March 2014; Label: God Dam Records; Formats: CD, download	1. A Longer Road; 2. Black Fly; 3. Pikey Killed My Goldfish; 4. Am I Drinking Enough?; 5. The Happy Bus
2015	Almost Home: Released: 15 March 2015; Label: God Dam Records; Formats: CD, download	1. Almost Home; 2. Talking Through The Walls; 3. I've Seen Things; 4. You Can't Find Me; 5. Cher; 6. The Sound; 7. The Devonside; 8. Heart Of Stone; 9. Mad Dog Coll; 10. Whiskey Man; 11. The Juggler
2019	It's a Sign EP: Released: 17 December 2019; Label: God Dam Records; Formats: CD, download	1. Sugar Water Sunday; 2. Resurrection Man; 3. The Sundial; 4. Damnation Alley; 5. Going Up
