= The Rock Orchestra =

British musical ensemble

The Rock Orchestra is a British orchestra that performs arrangements of popular rock and metal songs. The orchestra performs covers of popular songs from the rock and metal genres. Its stage shows feature skeletal-themed attire and face masks. The ensemble often performs by candlelight. Their lineup includes classical instruments, such as violins and cellos. The show's creator, Nathan Reed, described the idea behind the show as a spin-off of a club he was involved with: “It really started as a spin-off event. We had been running the Festival of the Dead, which we describe as a carnival, come circus, come clubbing experience. But lockdown curtailed these big weekend events."

Its stage show features giant headbanging skull puppets. The group incorporates electric instruments, effects pedals, and amplifiers, creating a powerful and unconventional sound.

The group has toured in the UK and the US. The orchestra's logistics involve an 18-ton truck, two tour buses, and a crew of 24, who prepare the ensemble's live shows.
