= The Redcastle Sessions =

Video by Cara Dillon
- Released: July 21, 2008 (UK)
- Recorded: January 2008
- Genre: Folk, pop
- Length: 90:00
- Label: Proper Films
- Director: Robin Bextor

The Redcastle Sessions is a DVD featuring live performances by folk artist Cara Dillon of songs from her first three solo albums, as well as previously unreleased songs and songs for inclusion on her fourth solo studio album. The DVD was filmed on location in a converted hospital at Redcastle, County Donegal in the Republic of Ireland and in McReynolds Bar, Dungiven, County Londonderry, Northern Ireland. Also included on the DVD is an interview with Dillon and footage of her returning to her parents' home house.

The DVD features 5.1 audio. Also included is a photo gallery of the filming of the DVD.

The original release date for the DVD was June 9, 2008, however due to manufacturing problems, the release was delayed. During Dillon's The Redcastle Sessions Tour in June, she had a special promotion whereby anyone who pre-ordered the DVD received a free copy of her single "If I Prove False" to compensate for the delay.

== Track listing ==
1. "Black Is the Colour"
2. "Bold Jamie"
3. "Where Are You"
4. "False False"
5. "This Time/I Wish You Well"
6. "If I Prove False"
7. "The Streets of Derry"
8. "High Tide"
9. "Garden Valley"
10. "I Am a Youth That's Inclined to Ramble"
11. "Never in a Million Years"
12. "October Winds"
13. "The Maid of Culmore"
14. "There Were Roses"

Bonus

- "P Stands for Paddy" (Live at McReynolds Bar, Dungiven, County Londonderry, Northern Ireland)

- Full Length Interview with Cara Dillon

- Photo Gallery

== Chart performance ==
| Chart (2008) | Peak position |
|---|---|
| UK Music DVD Chart | 14 |
| Amazon.co.uk World & Folk DVD Chart | 1 |
| HMV.co.uk Specialist Music DVD Top 10 | 8 |
