= Sean Lakeman =

English musician (born 1974)

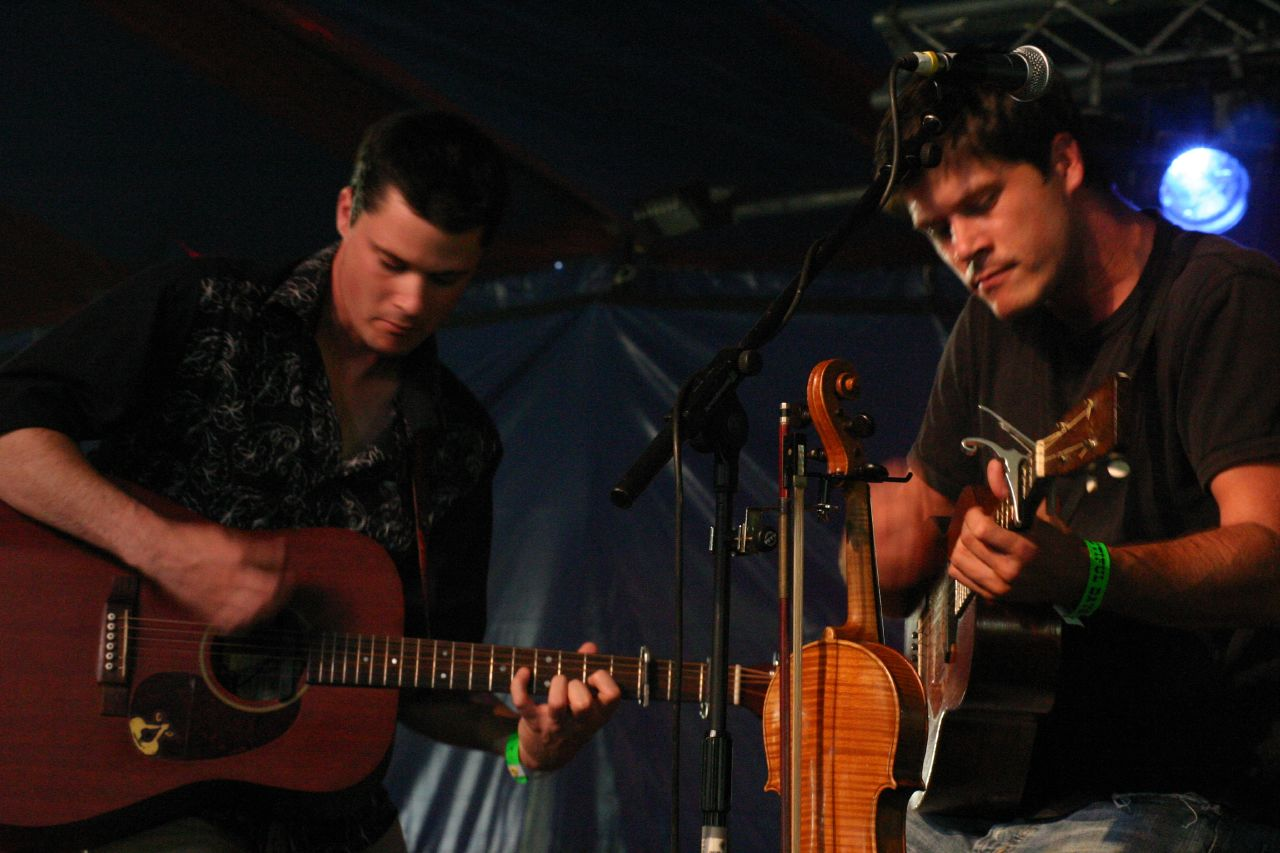
- Sean Lakeman (left) performing with his brother Seth in August 2005

Background information
- Born: 29 January 1974 (age 52)
- Origin: Buckland Monachorum, Devon, England
- Genres: English folk, British folk rock, acoustic folk
- Instruments: Acoustic guitar, guitar
- Years active: 1994–present
- Labels: iScream Music, WEA, Rough Trade, Putumayo
- Website: Official

Sean Lakeman (born 29 January 1974) is an English folk musician and record producer.

== Early life ==
Sean was born and brought up as the first of three boys in Buckland Monachorum, near Yelverton, Devon with his brothers, fellow folk musicians Seth Lakeman and Sam Lakeman. He began playing guitar at the age of six. He played with his parents, Geoff and Joy Lakeman, and with his brothers in a family band. He also made up a quarter of the BBC Radio 2 "Young Tradition Band" alongside Catriona MacDonald, Luke Daniels and Simon Thoumire.

== Career ==
In his early career, he partnered folk fiddle veteran Tom McConville on the UK folk club circuit, and from the early 1990s, played guitar as part of The Lakeman Brothers, with brothers Seth on violin and Sam on piano. The trio wrote and produced the album Three Piece Suite (1994), upon which Kathryn Roberts was a guest singer for two tracks.

=== Equation ===
Kathryn Roberts and Kate Rusby asked the Lakeman Brothers to accompany them as a backing band for a tour of Portugal in September 1994. On their return to the UK the five agreed to form their own band, Equation.

The name of the band refers to the initials of the band members' names, KR2 + SL3.

Shortly after the band was formed, Irish singer Cara Dillon replaced Kate Rusby. In the summer of 1995, the band signed a record deal with Blanco y Negro (Warner Music Group).

The band recorded their debut album at Peter Gabriel's Realworld Studios in 1995 and 1996. The album, Return to Me, was produced by David Bottrill (Tool, Muse, King Crimson). There was a single release, "He Loves Me", with an accompanying promotional video. The band performed on MTV and VH1, but weeks before the planned release of the album the record label shelved it. In 2003 it saw a release under Rough Trade after Geoff Travis (the band's A+R) bought its rights.

The band toured throughout the UK and Europe, and completed ten tours in the US in the late 1990s. The line-up would change over the years but Sean and Kathryn were constants as Equation went on to produce four albums: Return To Me (recorded 1996, released 2003), Hazy Daze (1998), The Lucky Few (1999), First Name Terms (2004), and The Dark Ages EP (2001).

=== Other projects ===
Lakeman has produced four albums for his younger brother Seth Lakeman. Freedom Fields went gold in the UK and was voted BBC Radio 2 Folk Album of the year (2007). The Mercury Music Prize nominated Kitty Jay and Poor Man's Heaven which were both certified Silver in the UK.

Lakeman is also half of the folk duo Kathryn Roberts and Sean Lakeman with his wife, singer Kathryn Roberts. They have recorded four albums together: 1 recorded in 2001 and 2 recorded in 2003, and after a nine-year hiatus, Hidden People (2012). Tomorrow Will Follow Today, released in early 2015, led to a tour of the UK.

In 2013 and 2016, the couple were voted Best Duo at the BBC Radio 2 Folk Awards. Kathryn's song 'The Ballad Of Andy Jacobs' was also nominated as Best Original Song at the same awards in 2013.

In August 2023, both Kathryn and Sean appeared as special guests with rock band The Levellers at the Beautiful Days festival performing two songs during the encore.

=== Record production ===
Lakeman's credits as record producer for folk and folk-rock bands include two highly acclaimed albums for The Levellers, plus other acts such as Seth Lakeman, Bellowhead, Frank Turner, Billy Bragg, Imelda May, The Willows, Carus Thompson, Show of Hands, Mad Dog Macrea, The Long Hill Ramblers and Rev Hammer.

Sean also appears as a session guitarist on albums by Cara Dillon and Caroline Herring.

== Personal life ==
Sean is married to singer Kathryn Roberts and they have twin daughters, born in July 2007.
