= Kitty Jay (album) =

Studio album by Seth Lakeman
- Released: 2004
- Recorded: By Sean Lakeman in the Piano Kitchen, Horrabridge, Devon
- Genre: Folk
- Length: 36:40
- Label: iScream
- Producers: Sean Lakeman and Seth Lakeman

Seth Lakeman chronology
The Punch Bowl (2002)	Kitty Jay (2004)	Freedom Fields (2006)

Kitty Jay is a music album by Seth Lakeman published in 2004. It is his second album that he published as a principal performer. It was shortlisted for the Mercury Music Prize for 2005. The songs were inspired by stories and legends from Dartmoor, where Lakeman grew up.

== Track listing ==
1. "John Lomas" (traditional) – 3:52
2. "The Bold Knight" (Seth Lakeman) – 3:51
3. "Fight for Favour" (Seth Lakeman) – 4:03
4. "Kitty Jay" (Seth Lakeman) – 3:12
5. "Farewell My Love" (Seth Lakeman) – 2:22
6. "Blood Upon Copper" (Seth Lakeman) – 3:04
7. "Henry Clark" (traditional) – 3:02
8. "The Storm" (Seth Lakeman) – 2:41
9. "Cape Clear" (traditional) – 4:20
10. "The Ballad of Josie" (Seth Lakeman) – 3:25
11. "The Streamers" (traditional) – 2:43

== Personnel ==
- Seth Lakeman: vocals, tenor guitar, violin, viola
- Sean Lakeman: guitar, electric bass, mandolin
- Ben Nicholls: double bass
- Iain Goodall: drums
- Kathryn Roberts: vocals
- Benji Kirkpatrick: bouzouki, vocals
- Audrey Mills: church organ

== Charts ==
Chart performance for Kitty Jay
Chart (2005)	Peak position
UK Albums (Official Charts)	100
UK Independent Albums (Official Charts)	15
