= Kathryn Roberts =

English folk singer

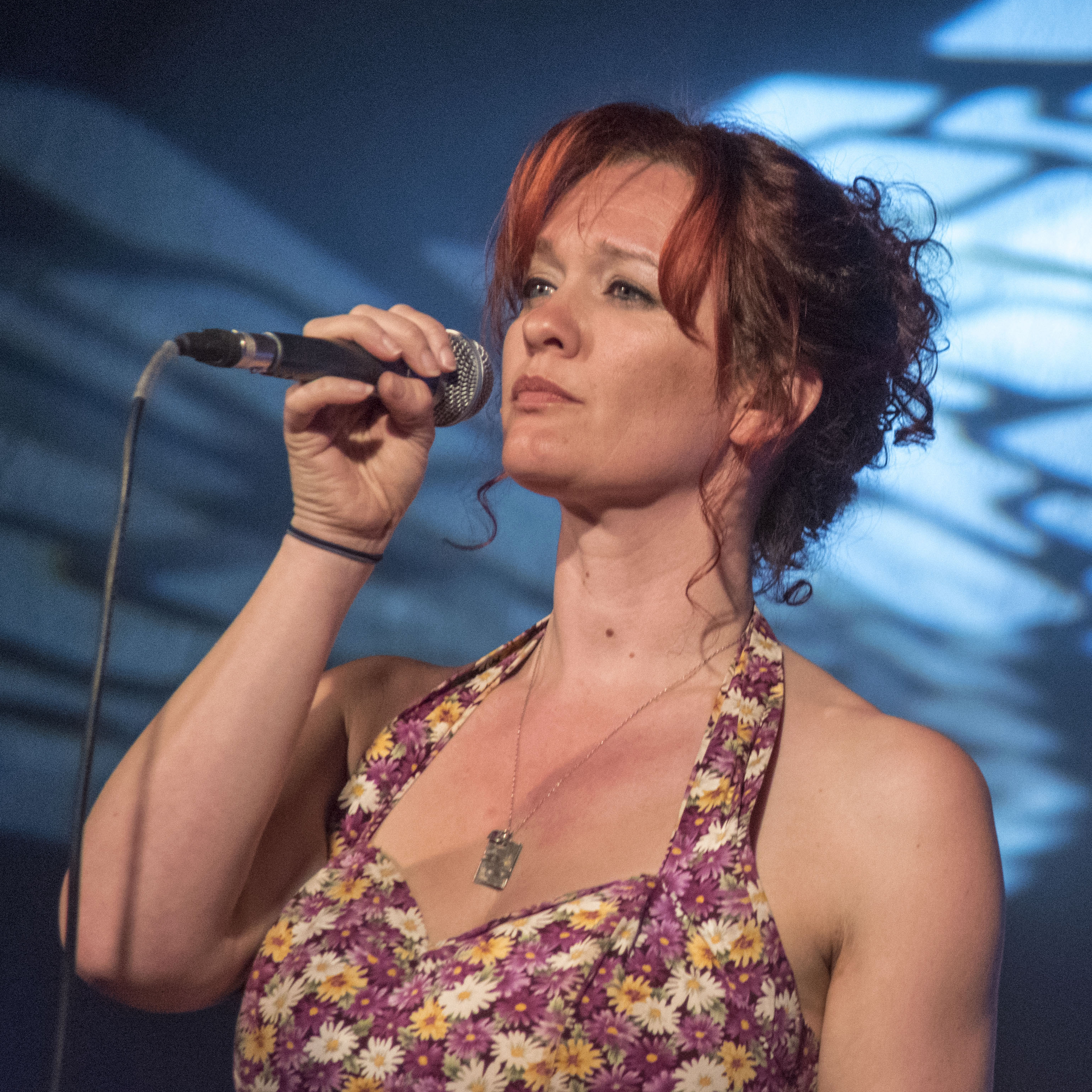
- Roberts in 2015

Background information
- Origin: Barnsley, South Yorkshire, England
- Genres: English folk, British folk rock, acoustic folk
- Instruments: Vocals, Piano, Woodwind
- Years active: 1994–present
- Labels: iScream Music, WEA, Rough Trade, Putumayo
- Website: http://kathrynrobertsandseanlakeman.com

Kathryn Roberts is an English folk singer, from Barnsley, South Yorkshire.

== Early career ==
Roberts' first released recordings were on the album Intuition, a collection of songs by various South Yorkshire folk artists which also included her friend Kate Rusby. Roberts went on to record the critically acclaimed album Kate Rusby & Kathryn Roberts with her in 1995, which was voted Album of the Year by fRoots magazine.

== Equation ==
Roberts and Rusby formed the band Equation, along with Devon-based folk musicians the Lakeman Brothers (Sean, Sam and Seth). They recorded an EP CD in 1995, with Rusby and Roberts sharing lead vocals. This led to the group being signed to Blanco y Negro Records / WEA by Geoff Travis. Rusby left soon after, to be replaced with Irish singer Cara Dillon. Dillon also left after one album, leaving Roberts as the sole lead singer. Equation made four albums and two EPs. They toured throughout the UK, Europe and extensively through the US as a "folk supergroup".

== Kathryn Roberts and Sean Lakeman ==
Around 2001, Roberts and Sean Lakeman toured British folk clubs in an attempt to return to their folk roots. They released two albums as a duo, titled 1 and 2, before taking time away from the road to start a family. The couple returned to touring in 2011 and recorded their third album Hidden People in 2012. In 2013 they were voted Best Duo at the BBC Radio 2 Folk Awards. Roberts' song "The Ballad Of Andy Jacobs" was also nominated as Best Original Song.

== Other projects ==
Roberts appeared on Seth Lakeman's albums Kitty Jay, Freedom Fields and Poor Man's Heaven (Album).

She took part in the Cecil Sharp Project in March 2011, a multi-artist residential project organised by the Shrewsbury Folk Festival to create new works based on the life, work and collecting of folklorist Cecil Sharp.

In 2020, Roberts appeared as a guest on the song Lift Dickie Bird Where He Belongs by the Barnsley comedy band The Bar-Steward Sons of Val Doonican, duetting with the band's lead singer Scott Doonican.

== Personal life ==
Roberts is married to Sean Lakeman. They have twin daughters.

== Discography ==
- Intuition (1993)
- Kate Rusby & Kathryn Roberts (1995)
- Equation – In Session E.P. (1995)
- Equation – Return To Me (1996, released 2003)
- Equation – Hazy Daze (1998)
- Equation – The Lucky Few (1999)
- Equation – Dark Ages E.P. (2001)
- Equation – First Name Terms (2002)
- Kathryn Roberts & Sean Lakeman – 1 (2003)
- Kathryn Roberts & Sean Lakeman – 2 (2004)
- Kathryn Roberts & Sean Lakeman – Hidden People (2012)
- Kathryn Roberts & Sean Lakeman – Tomorrow Will Follow Today (2015)
- Cecil Sharp Project – Cecil Sharp Project 2011
- Kathryn Roberts & Sean Lakeman – Personae (2018)
- Kathryn Roberts & Sean Lakeman – Another Day At The Circus (Live album) (2025)
