= Seth Lakeman =

English musician (born 1977)

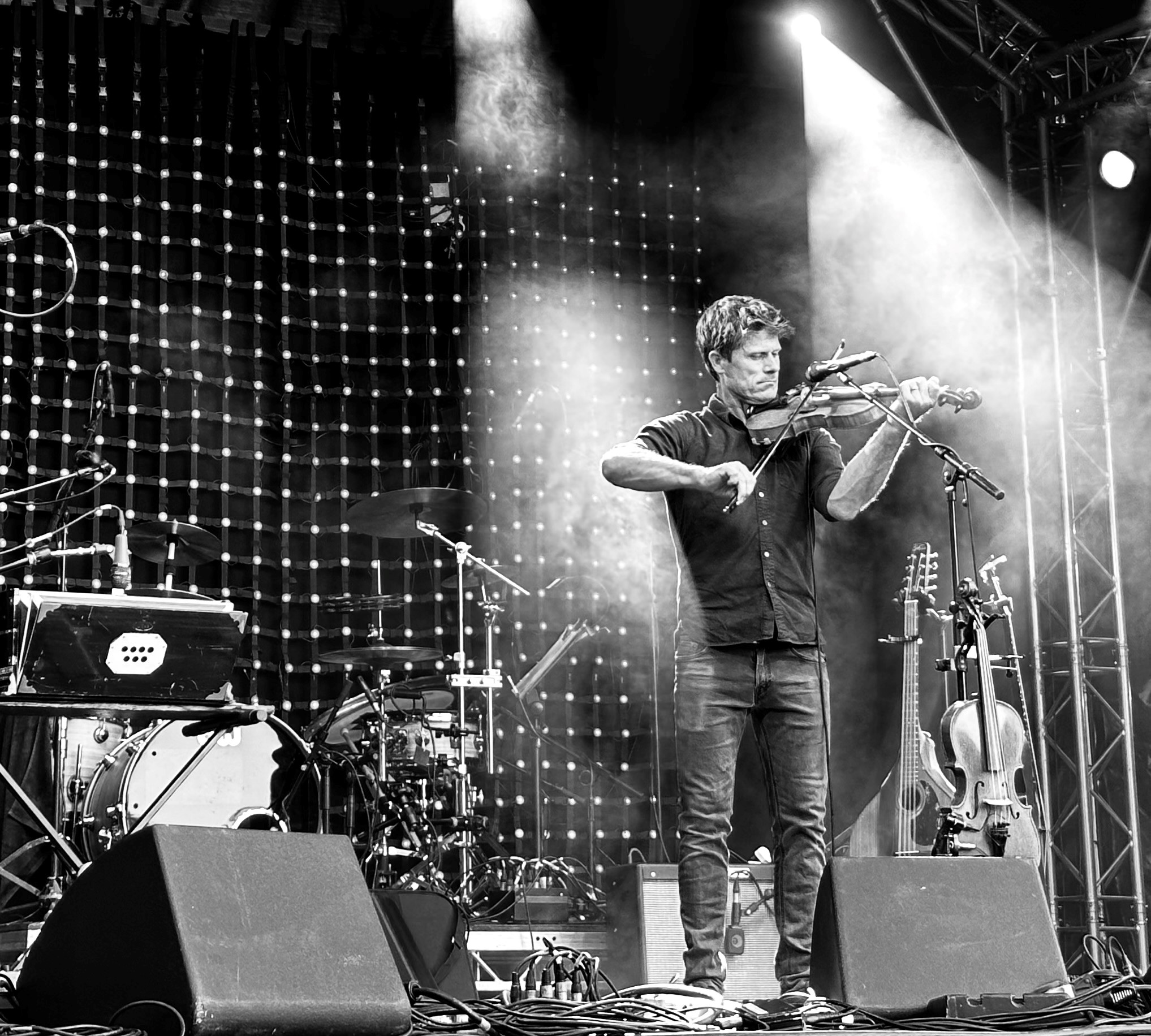
- Lakeman performing at Hampton Pool, London, in July 2023

Background information
- Born: Seth Bernard Lakeman; 26 March 1977 (age 49); Frome, Somerset
- Genres: English folk; British folk rock; acoustic folk
- Instruments: Vocals; violin; tenor guitar; viola; banjo
- Years active: 1994–present
- Labels: iScream (pre-2006); Relentless; EMI; Virgin; Cooking Vinyl
- Formerly of: The Lakeman Brothers; Equation
- Website: sethlakeman.co.uk

Seth Bernard Lakeman (born 26 March 1977) is an English singer, songwriter and multi-instrumentalist, who is most often associated with the fiddle and tenor guitar, but also plays the viola and banjo. Nominated for the 2005 Mercury Music Prize, Lakeman has belonged to several musical ensembles, including one with his two brothers, fellow folk musicians Sam Lakeman and Sean Lakeman, but has most recently established himself as a solo act. He is recognized as a fiddle-singing pioneer.

== Career ==
=== The Lakeman Brothers ===
Though born in Somerset to a Cornish father and London mother, Seth Lakeman grew up with his two brothers, Sean Lakeman and Sam Lakeman, in the village of Buckland Monachorum in West Devon, England. He began playing music with his parents and brothers at an early age.

As the Lakeman Brothers, the three brothers released their debut album Three Piece Suite in 1994. Later that same year they were invited by two Yorkshire based singers Kathryn Roberts and Kate Rusby to join them as a backing group on a tour of Portugal. After the tour the five musicians became a permanent group and called themselves Equation. The group were signed in a record deal with Time Warner in 1995. After three full albums (Return to Me in 1996, Hazy Daze in 1998, and The Lucky Few in 2000), and tours in the UK, Europe and the United States, Lakeman left Equation in 2001. He joined his brother Sam and Sam's wife Cara Dillon and appeared on Dillon's eponymous debut album, which featured Lakeman on fiddle, guitar and vocals. The album won two awards at the 2002 BBC Radio 2 Folk Awards.

=== Solo work ===
In 2002 Lakeman released his first solo album, The Punch Bowl, produced by elder brother Sean Lakeman which received wide critical acclaim including a review in fRoots magazine which said: "The songs don't just glide smoothly by.....they get their claws into you".

Kitty Jay, Lakeman's second solo album, was released in 2004. This was also produced by brother Sean Lakeman in his kitchen. The title track of the album tells the story of Jay's Grave, a well known location on Dartmoor. The album was recorded for a cost of less than £300. The album reached silver status in the UK. That same year he collaborated with Devon singer-songwriter Steve Knightley and young local singer Jenna Witts on the album Western Approaches.

A UK tour in Autumn 2005 followed his Mercury Music Prize nomination, after which Lakeman and his band (regularly brother Sean Lakeman (guitar), Ben Nichols (bass), Andy Tween (drums)), toured extensively with folk-rock band the Levellers, who took to closing their set with a "fiddle off" between Lakeman and Levellers' fiddler Jonathan Sevink. Other support tours with Billy Bragg and Jools Holland brought Lakeman's music to a wider audience.

In March 2006 Lakeman began a UK tour to promote his new album Freedom Fields which was released on iScream. Produced again by Sean Lakeman, he signed to a new major record label, Relentless Records, promptly releasing a new single "Lady of the Sea" in early August 2006. This record went gold making it one of the biggest selling traditionally based folk records ever in the UK.

His fourth solo album, Poor Man's Heaven, was released on 30 June 2008 with an accompanying tour. It introduced a rockier edge to the folk of the previous albums. It was also the last album to be produced by Sean Lakeman and it was awarded silver levels of sales in the UK.

Lakeman's fifth album, Hearts & Minds, was released on 19 July 2010. Produced by studio veteran Tchad Blake Lakeman released his sixth album called Tales from the Barrel House on 18 November 2011. In 2014 the Word of Mouth album was released.

In 2018 Lakeman released another album, The Well Worn Path. His eleventh studio album, Make Your Mark, followed in November 2021. The title track "Make Your Mark" was playlisted at BBC Radio 2.

Sea Song Sessions is a collection of British maritime folk songs and sea shanties, performed by Jon Boden, Lakeman, Ben Nicholls, Emily Portman and Jack Rutter. The artists celebrated the release of the album in September 2022 with a run of on-board and harbourside performances which they sailed to and from by ship.

Lakeman recorded on Van Morrison's album Moving On Skiffle in 2022 and he collaborated with Public Service Broadcasting and performed with them at the Royal Albert Hall. Lakeman has previously worked and toured extensively with Robert Plant with his band the Sensational Space Shifters.

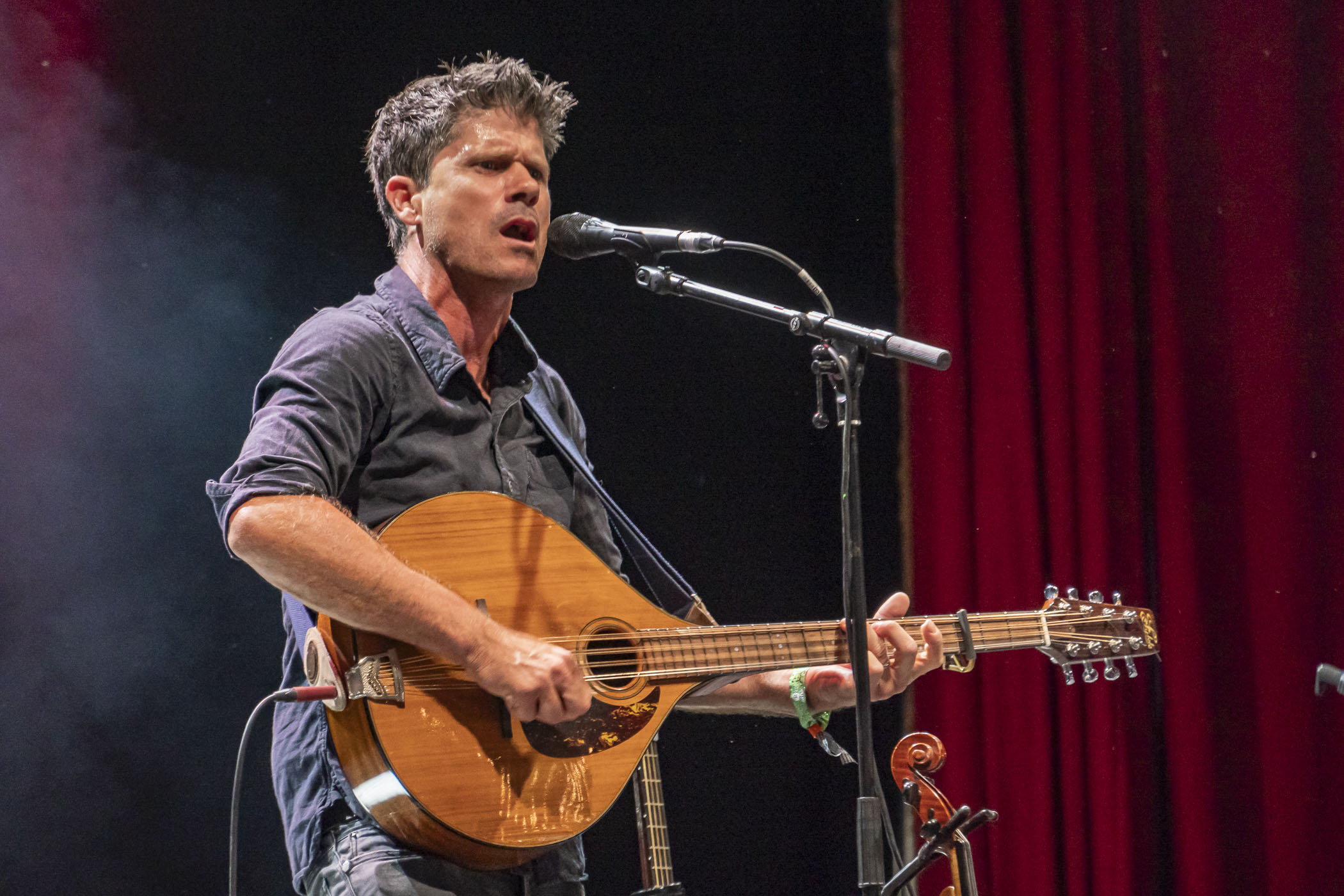
Lakeman performing at the Glastonbury Festival in June 2023

After a limited vinyl pressing for Record Store Day 2023, The Somerset Sessions was given a wider release on Lakeman's own label Honour Oak Records in July 2023. The album features original, unreleased session recordings from Lakeman featuring Ethan Johns, Jeremy Stacey, John Smith, Nick Pini and Alex Hart that were recorded at the Bert Jansch Studio in Frome.

2024 marks the 20th anniversary of Kitty Jay and following the 20th Anniversary tour in February there will be a standing tour in October with the band including long-time collaborators Benji Kirkpatrick, Ben Nicholls, Cormac Byrne and Alex Hart. The February Kitty Jay Tour opened with a sold out concert at Exeter's Corn Exchange on 20 February 2024. Lakeman's father Geoff made a guest appearance on spoons.

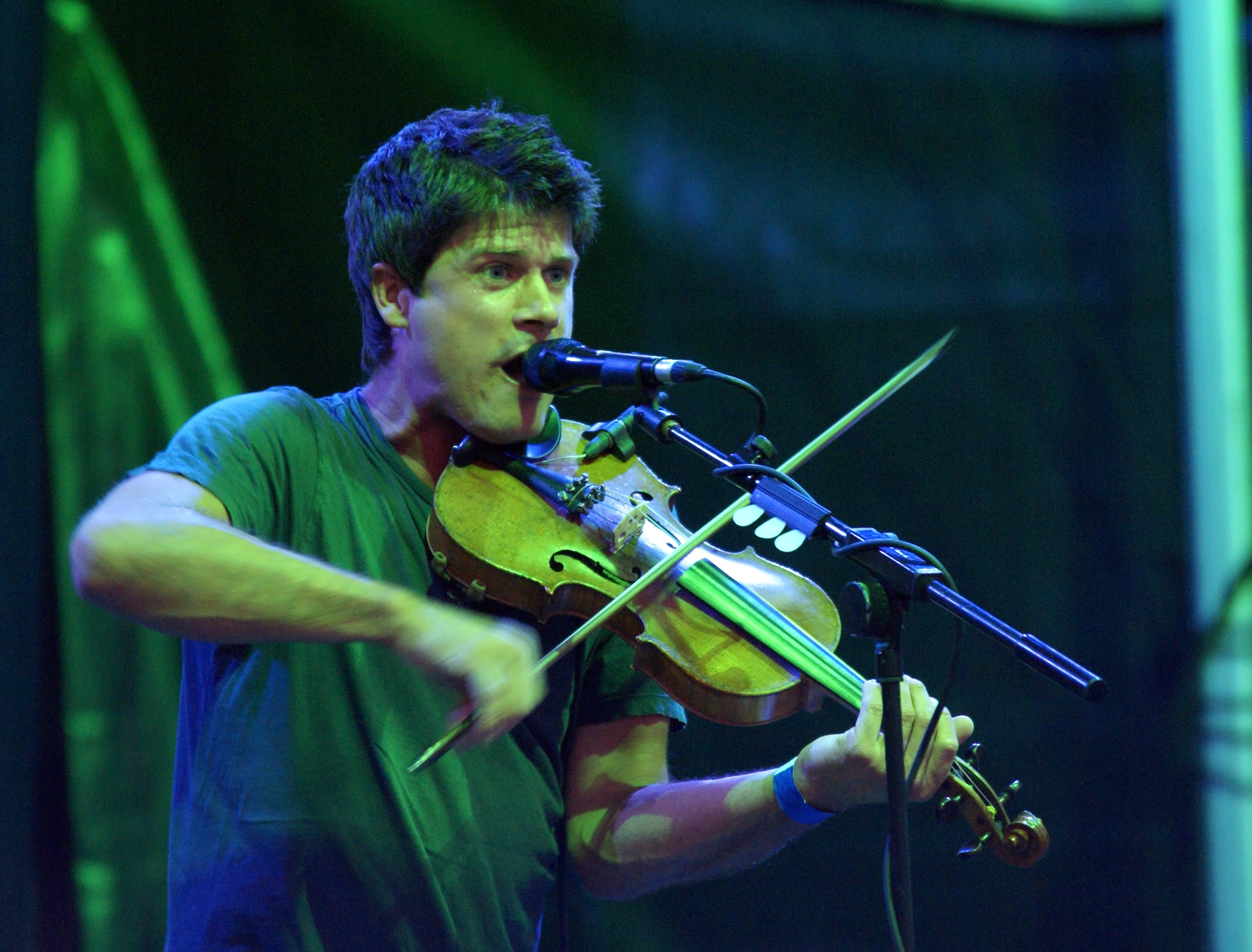
Lakeman performing at Folk by the Oak Festival, Hatfield House in 2008

== Awards ==
- In July 2005 Lakeman was nominated for the Mercury Music Prize for his album Kitty Jay.
- On 5 February 2007 Lakeman won Singer of the Year and Best Album awards at the BBC Radio 2 Folk Awards.

== Instruments ==
Lakeman's primary musical instruments are the violin, the tenor guitar, the banjo and the viola.

== Personal life ==
Lakeman was married in 2012 to his longterm fiancée, Hannah Edwards, at Withiel, near Wadebridge in Cornwall. During the church service, the bride's 90-year-old grandfather, who is a Cornish bard, read a blessing in Cornish. The wedding was described by Lakeman's father, Geoff, as a "mini-festival". Among the wedding guests who also made performance contributions were Cara Dillon, Steve Knightley, Cormac Byrne and Mad Dog Mcrea.

== Discography ==
=== Singles ===
- "The Bold Knight" (2005)
- "Lady of the Sea" (2006) #52
- "The White Hare" (2006) #47
- "King & Country" (2006)
- "Poor Man's Heaven" (EP) (2007) #95
- "The Hurlers" (2008)
- "Crimson Dawn" (2008)
- "Solomon Brown" (2008) about the Penlee lifeboat disaster
- "Hearts & Minds" (2010)
- "Tiny World" (2010)
- "Stepping Over You" (2010)
- "Blacksmiths Prayer" (2011)
- "More Than Money" (2011)
- "Portrait of My Wife" (2013)
- "The Courier" (2014)
- "Last Rider" (2014)

=== Albums ===
==== As main artist ====
- The Punch Bowl (2002, iScream)
- Kitty Jay (2004, iScream) UK No. 100
- Freedom Fields (2006, iScream) UK No. 32
- Poor Man's Heaven (2008, Relentless) UK No. 8
- Hearts & Minds (2010, Virgin) UK No. 17
- Tales from the Barrel House (2011, Honour Oak) UK No. 63
- Word of Mouth (2014, Honour Oak / Cooking Vinyl) UK No. 20
- Ballads of the Broken Few (2016, Cooking Vinyl) UK No. 18
- The Well Worn Path (2018, Cooking Vinyl) UK No. 49
- A Pilgrim's Tale (2020, Cooking Vinyl) UK No. 39
- Make Your Mark (2021, Honour Oak)
- Somerset Sessions (2023, Honour Oak) UK Folk Chart No. 1
- The Granite Way (2025, Honour Oak)

==== With The Lakeman Brothers ====
- Three Piece Suite (1994)

==== With Equation ====
- Hazy Days (1998)
- The Lucky Few (1999)
- Dark Ages E.P. (2000)
- First Name Terms (2002)
- Return to Me (2003)

==== With Steve Knightley and Jenna Witts ====
- Western Approaches (2004)

=== With the Full English ===
- The Full English is a folk music digital archive project. Lakeman joined Fay Hield, Martin Simpson and others to create a Full English group to record folk songs for the archive, followed by a national tour. (Topic, 7 October 2013)
