= Sam Lakeman =

British musician (born 1975)

Sam Lakeman on The Redcastle Session DVD shoot, 2008

Samuel Charles Lakeman (born 6 November 1975) is an English musician, songwriter, and producer and co-owner of Charcoal Records. He is known for his work with his wife, the Northern Irish singer Cara Dillon.

== Career ==
Lakeman was brought up in the village of Buckland Monachorum, near Yelverton, Devon, United Kingdom, with his brothers, fellow musicians Seth Lakeman and Sean Lakeman. Lakeman began playing music with his parents and two brothers at an early age.

As a family band they started playing at festivals, and small concerts. Lakeman and his siblings formed The Lakeman Brothers in the early 1990s – with Sam on piano/keyboards, Seth Lakeman on fiddle, and Sean Lakeman on guitar. The brothers toured throughout the UK and Europe during weekends and school holidays, performing at festivals and venues winning critical acclaim for their musical abilities, compositions and fresh arrangements of traditional tunes. The trio wrote and produced the album 'Three Piece Suite' (1994).

In the late part of 1994 they were invited by two Yorkshire based singers Kathryn Roberts and Kate Rusby to join them as a backing group on a tour of Portugal. After the tour the five musicians became a permanent group and called themselves Equation.

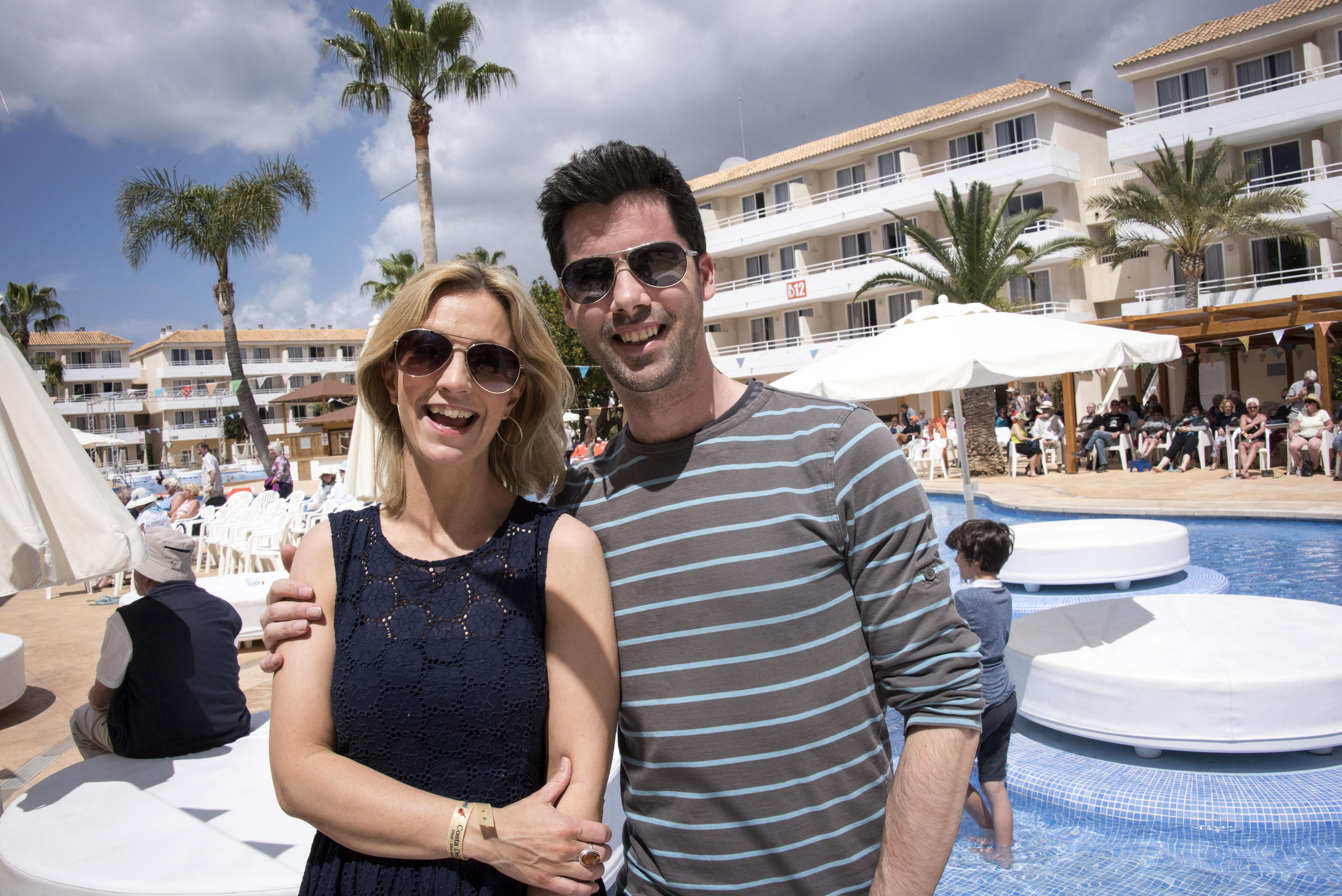
Lakeman in 2016

Shortly after Cara Dillon replaced Kate Rusby in the summer of 1995, the group signed a major record deal with Blanco y Negro (part of Warner Music Group) and recorded an album at Peter Gabriel's Realworld Studios in winter 1995–'96. The album, entitled Return to Me, was produced by David Bottrill. There was a single release, "He Loves Me", with an accompanying promotional video. The band performed on MTV and VH1, but weeks before the release of the album the record label shelved it. It was not released in 1996, but in 2003 it saw a release under Rough Trade after Geoff Travis (the band's A+R) bought its rights.

Lakeman left Equation along with Dillon and the duo was known as Polar Star. During this time Lakeman formed a strong musical partnership with Dillon. They recorded several albums with top songwriters and producers in the UK and San Francisco, but none of this work was released. By 2000, Lakeman and Dillon had decided that they would never be able to give the label what they wanted. Around summer 2000, Dillon and Lakeman ended their five-year relationship with Warner Music Group and signed to Indie label Rough Trade Records under the guidance of their then manager Geoff Travis. On Rough Trade Records Lakeman produced, co-wrote and recorded all three of Dillon's albums and toured with her to promote all the releases.

Lakeman has produced, co-wrote, arranged and recorded all seven of Dillon's solo albums to date as well as featuring on piano, acoustic guitar, hammond organ, harmonium and percussion. He was co-producer and musical director on The Redcastle Sessions (DVD) and was executive producer and musical director for the DVD "Cara Dillon – Live at the Grand Opera House", he has performed, produced and mixed for a variety of artists including Seth Lakeman, Ian Anderson, and Disney. He has toured the world performing at festivals or in concert halls in Europe, China, Japan, Australia, New Zealand, South Korea, the US and Canada.

After completing their record contract with Rough Trade, Lakeman and Dillon formed Charcoal Records in 2008 and released Cara's fourth album Hill of Thieves in January 2009. In February 2010 It won the BBC Radio 2 Folk Award for "Album of the Year". Charcoal has gone on to release, "Upon A Winter's Night" in 2016 and "Wanderer" in 2017.

Lakeman has also produced albums for John Smith including Headlong (2017), Hummingbird (2018) and The Fray (2021).

== Personal life ==
He currently lives in Frome in Somerset, with Dillon and their three children.
