= Cara Dillon =

Irish folk singer (born 1975)

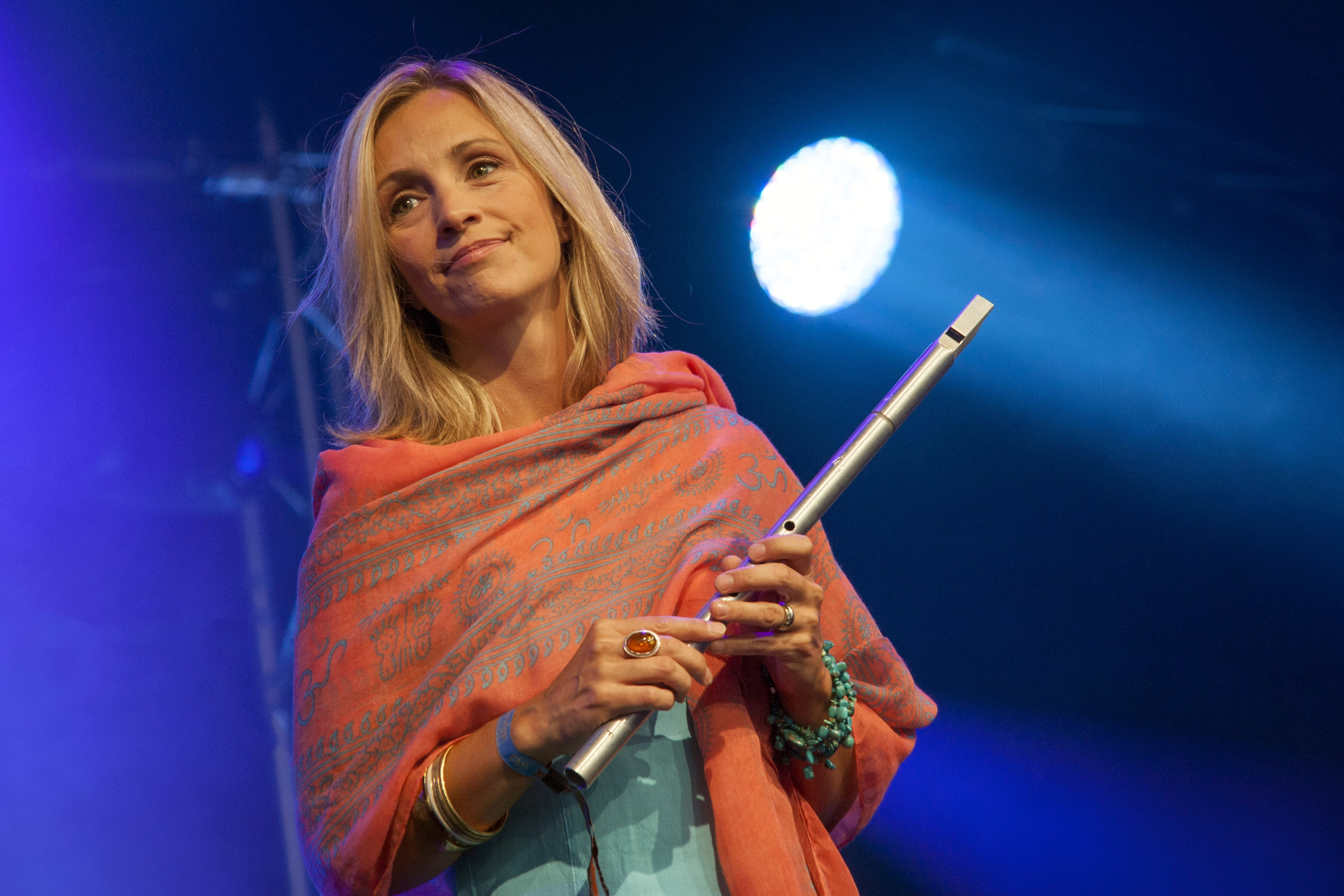
- Dillon in 2014

Background information
- Born: Cara Elizabeth Dillon; 21 July 1975 (age 51); Dungiven, County Londonderry, Northern Ireland
- Genres: Folk
- Occupation: Singer
- Instruments: Vocals, tin whistle, fiddle
- Years active: 1995–present
- Labels: Rough Trade, Charcoal Records – own
- Website: Official website

Cara Elizabeth Dillon (born 21 July 1975) is a Northern Irish folk singer.

In 1995, she joined the folk group Equation and signed a record deal with Warners Music Group. After leaving the group, she collaborated with Sam Lakeman under the name Polar Star. In 2001, she released her first solo album, Cara Dillon, which featured traditional songs and two original Dillon/Lakeman compositions. The album was an unexpected hit in the folk world, with Dillon receiving four nominations at the 2002 BBC Radio 2 Folk Awards. She has since released a further eight albums.

== Biography ==
=== The early years (1991–1995) ===
Dillon comes from an area steeped in Irish traditional music. Since she was a schoolgirl she has sung and performed. She learned local folk songs from teachers and workshops held in the town. She can also play the fiddle and whistles. At the age of 14 she won the All Ireland Singing Trophy at Fleadh Cheoil na hÉireann.

In 1991 she formed a band called Óige (an Irish word meaning 'youth') with school friends Murrough and Ruadhrai O'Kane, bringing her take on Irish traditional songs to Ireland, Scotland and further afield. During this time she also performed with big names such as De Dannan and Phil Coulter. Óige recorded two albums with Dillon: a studio and a live album. Inspiration was recorded in 1992 to sell at concerts in Europe. The live album, simply called Live, was recorded at a concert in Glasgow on 15 August 1993. A cassette tape version also exists under the name Live in Glasgow. Dillon left Óige in 1995 after being asked to replace Kate Rusby in a so-called folk supergroup Equation; however, she guests on their second studio album, Bang On, playing fiddles on the last track, "Maids of Mitchelstown".

=== Blanco y Negro Records (1995–2000) ===
Equation comprised five members: Sean Lakeman, Sam Lakeman, Seth Lakeman, Kathryn Roberts and Dillon. They signed a major record deal with Blanco y Negro (part of Warner Music Group) and recorded an album at Peter Gabriel's Realworld Studios in winter 1995–'96. The album, entitled Return to Me, was produced by David Bottrill. There was a single release, "He Loves Me", with an accompanying promotional video. The band performed on MTV and VH1, but weeks before the release of the album the record label shelved it. It was not released in 1996, but in 2003 it saw a release under Rough Trade after Geoff Travis (the band's former manager) bought its rights.

Dillon left Equation with original band member Sam Lakeman because of musical differences and together they immediately signed a separate deal with the same label. The duo was known as Polar Star. During this time Dillon formed a strong musical partnership with Lakeman. They recorded several albums with top songwriters and producers in the UK and San Francisco, but none of their work was released. Dillon provided the vocals to the song "Man in the Rain" on Mike Oldfield's 1998 album Tubular Bells III, where she was credited as "Cara from Polar Star". By 2000, Dillon and Lakeman had decided that they would never be able to give the label what they wanted. Circa summer 2000, Dillon and Lakeman ended their five-year relationship with Warner Music Group and signed to Indie label Rough Trade Records.

=== Rough Trade Records (2001–2007) ===
Dillon recorded her first album in The Firs, Lakeman's parents' house. There were also recordings made in County Donegal, Ireland. The album was produced and recorded by Lakeman and mixed by John Reynolds (Sinéad O'Connor and Damien Dempsey). It contained nine traditional songs Dillon had since her schooldays and also had two original Dillon/Lakeman songs "Blue Mountain River" (which became a single in her native land) and "I Wish I Was". The album was released on 16 July 2001, to critical acclaim. The reaction to the album, according to Dillon, was very unexpected. The opening track of the album is "Black is the Colour". The track was given a more modern arrangement by Lakeman with Hammond organs and bass playing combined with a piano riff. Dillon's vocal earned her comparisons to Kate Bush. Throughout 2001 and 2002, Dillon toured the album extensively in the UK, Ireland and Europe and her fan base grew steadily. The album won many awards and got very positive reviews. The couple ended 2002 on a high with their marriage in December.

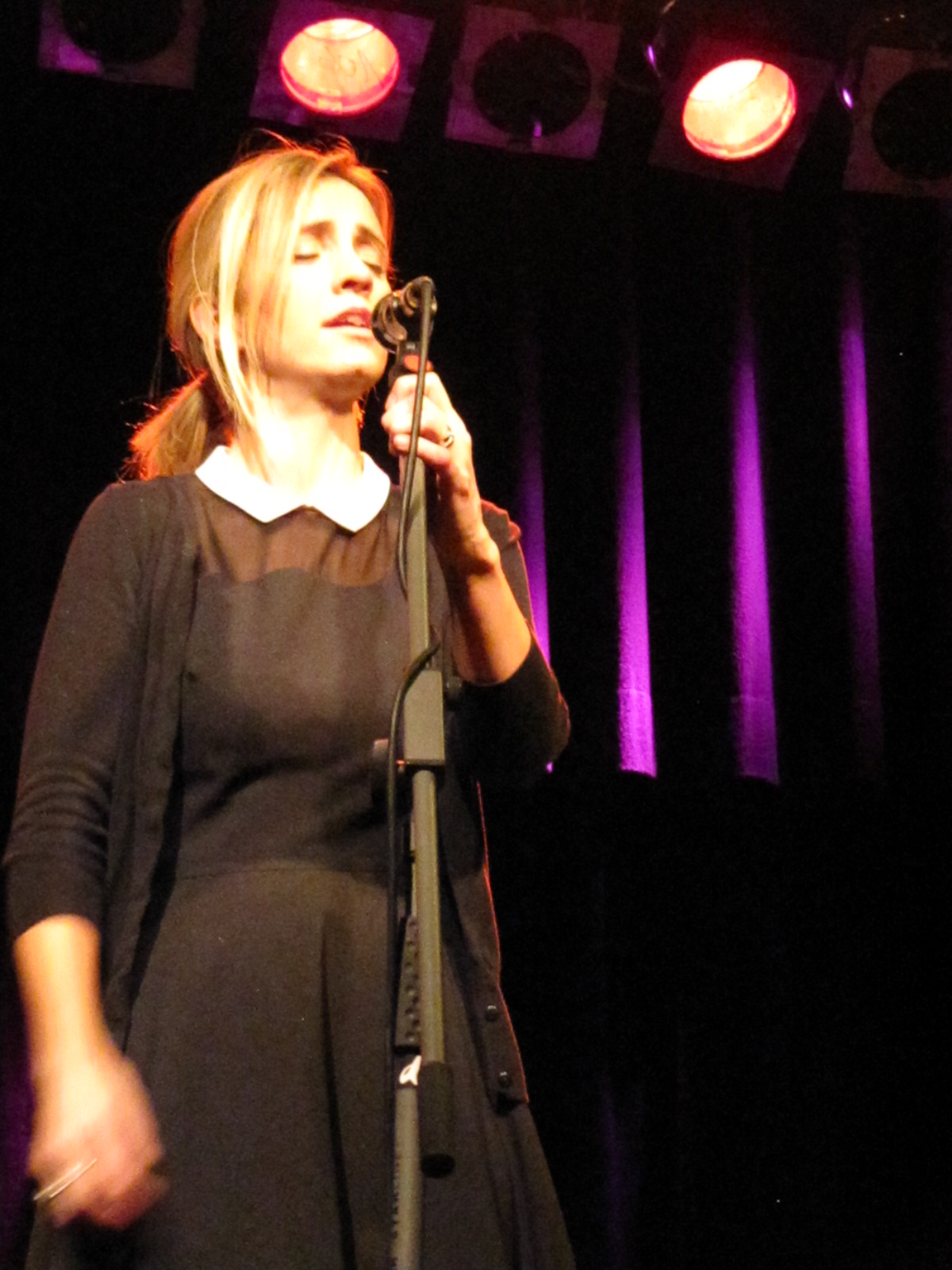
Dillon performing in 2014

The follow-up album, Sweet Liberty, was released on 22 September 2003. In terms of sales and airplay, the album was a bigger success. Sales were helped by the inclusion of Dillon's popular version of "There Were Roses" (notably featured on the BBC series Billy Connolly's World Tour of England, Ireland and Wales). The album entered the Irish album charts and the UK indie album charts. The album was promoted with songs "High Tide", "There Were Roses" and "Everywhere". The album also had a more balanced mix of traditional and original material, including another Kate Bush-esque track, "Falling Like a Star" and "Broken Bridges". Both songs showed Dillon and Lakeman's songwriting could successfully cross musical borders. The album was again produced by Lakeman and mixed by John Reynolds and Alan Branch and was recorded "at home in Somerset".

In January 2004, Dillon travelled to Japan on a promotional tour of the album. Dillon's solo career up this point was polished with her receiving The Meteor Irish Music Award for Best Irish Female. With two albums under her belt, Dillon's music was showcased on an international scale. Her relationship with WOMAD played a crucial part in this. The couple returned to the studio again in summer 2004 to record their third album.

Her third album, After the Morning, was released on 27 February 2006. The album was the longest in the making to date and featured several guest appearances. The Czech Philharmonic Orchestra recorded for two tracks on the album, Garden Valley & The Snows They Melt The Soonest; Martin Simpson, the acclaimed blues guitarist featured on Grace; two of Ireland's finest traditional musicians Mairtin O'Connor and Cathal Hayden perform on Bold Jamie and Cara duetted with Paul Brady on album highlight The Streets of Derry.

The album gave Dillon her most successful radio hit to date, Never in a Million Years, garnering a good amount of airplay on radio stations in the UK and Ireland. The song featured on the Radio 2 playlist for six weeks and was record of the week on BBC Radio Ulster and RTÉ Radio 1. Despite the encouraging reception of the song, an official single release was never given to the song and it was released on download-only by iTunes a week prior to the album release and climbed into the top 40 most downloaded songs that week. An official single release was planned for after the album came out but it did not happen. The next single to be released from the album was a double A side: This Time/I Wish You Well. It featured a new radio mix of This Time with added vocals and guitars. The single generated some airplay on Radio 2 in July 2006 and was scheduled for release on 14 August, however Rough Trade cancelled it, citing a lack of airplay.

=== Charcoal Records (2008–present) ===
In January 2008, Cara and her band recorded a DVD The Redcastle Sessions in County Donegal which led to an extensive tour starting in the May and continuing through the folk festival season to the winter of 2008/9. This tour took in venues across Ireland, Great Britain and The USA and introduced guitarist John Smith as a duet partner on the single If I Prove False, this single and a fourth album Hill of Thieves (released 26 January 2009) saw Cara move to her own label Charcoal Records. Despite the move from Rough Trade, Hill of Thieves was to become Dillon's best-selling album and was named Folk Album of the Year at the 2010 BBC Radio 2 Folk Awards.

The success of Hill of Thieves meant that the follow up A Thousand Hearts was not released until 2014. Similar to Hill of Thieves it features more traditional production and arrangements than Dillon's first three albums. The album contains traditional songs (including two sung in Irish Gaelic) as well as two modern covers, "Shotgun Down the Avalanche" by Shawn Colvin and "River Run". Released in conjunction with Sony Music, the album entered the UK indie charts at number 6.

Dillon's sixth solo album was 2016's Upon a Winter's Night, featuring eight arrangements of traditional carols and three original compositions. The album was the foundation of subsequent special Christmas shows which have been a regular part of Dillon's tours since.

The release of the Wanderer in 2017 saw Dillon returning to Irish folk ballads, especially the themes of emigration, both historical and contemporary. The record saw a stripped back approach with it chiefly just being Dillon on vocals with producer / husband Sam Lakeman on keyboards or guitar. It was well received by critics upon release. The Guardian's Neil Spencer described the album with the headline "gorgeous homesick blues" and awarded the album four stars.

2021 saw the release of Dillon's first live album ‘Live at Cooper Hall’ which featured material that had originally been broadcast as part of two special shows available free online during the Covid epidemic. The songs chosen were a wide representation of Dillon's career to date, ranging from fan favourite 'Black is the Colour’ to unreleased material: "The Water Is Wide” and the Disney Tinkerbell film track “Come Flying With Me".

=== Notable events, collaborations and guest appearances ===
Throughout Dillon's career she has ventured into many successful collaborations with a range of artists. In 1998, she was guest vocalist (credited as "Cara from Polar Star") for Mike Oldfield on the single from his Tubular Bells III album, "Man in the Rain". In 2001, she featured on two tracks on the John Reynolds project Interview with the Angel, an album by Ghostland. Cara sang on the tracks "Faith in Love" and "Sacred Touch of Beauty", the former being the album's lead single. 2005 saw her guest on the soundtrack to Keeping Mum, a British comedy. In 2003, she performed at the Belfast Festival at Queen's Opening Ceremony with the Ulster Orchestra.

Also on the dance scene, Dillon's award-winning version of Black Is The Colour was remixed by DJ Pete Devine (2Devine/Coco & Green) and became an instant hit on the dance floors in 2005. Over the next year, the popularity grew steadily and the track topped many polls and became a favourite of the top DJs on the scene. Following legal difficulties with the clearance of the track the release on the Anjunabeats dance label was not until 19 March 2007.

The year 2006 Dillon was honoured with the invitation to perform at the opening ceremony of the 2006 Ryder Cup at the K Club in Ireland. She sang the Irish song Mo Ghile Mear to an audience estimated at 500 million worldwide with Afro Celt Sound System vocalist Iarla Ó Lionáird, a 60-piece choir and 23-piece band. In October 2006, she performed at the re-opening of the prestigious Grand Opera House in Belfast. In 2006, Judge Jules released his debut album, to which Cara provided vocals on the lead UK single Ordinary Day. The trance track was a big club hit and entered the UK dance charts at 3. 2006 also saw Dillon involved with the BBC Radio 2 Radio Ballads, and her vocals feature on the episode Thirty Years of Conflict. This was released on CD and an album of songs from the radio ballads has also been released (see Discography).

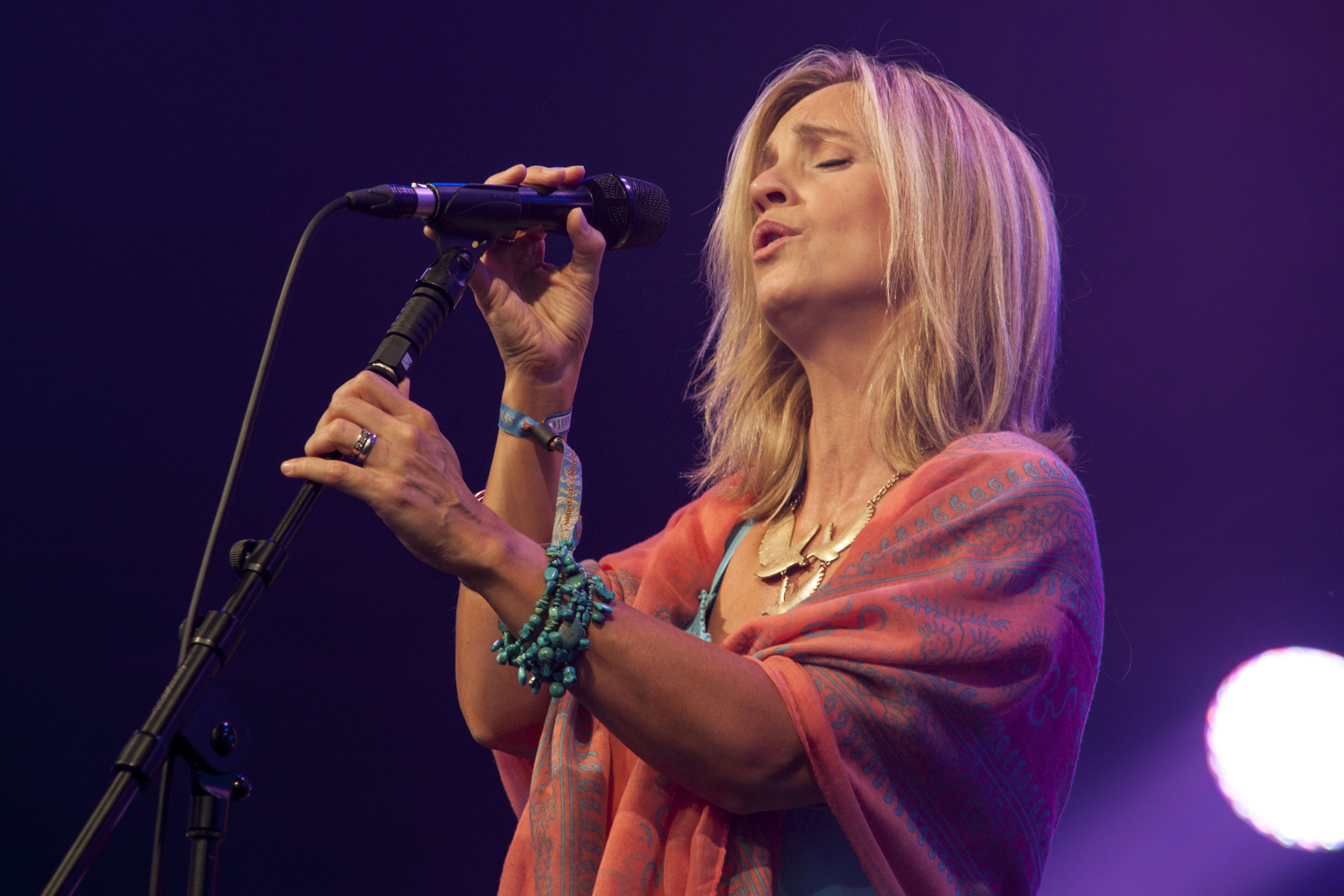
Dillon at the Cambridge Folk Festival, 2014

In 2009, Cara recorded the official Children in Need single, All You Need Is Love alongside Peter Gabriel, Terry Wogan, Hayley Westenra and others at Abbey Road Studios. In September she also recorded a live DVD called "Cara Dillon – Live at the Grand Opera House" in the Opera House in Belfast with the line up from her award-winning album Hill of Thieves. Acclaimed loudspeaker manufacturers Bowers & Wilkins used 11 songs from this recording in their Society of Sound music club which showcases ultra high quality audio recording for audiophiles. The live recording of "The Hill of Thieves" was also used by Bowers & Wilkins as a demonstration song in-store throughout the world on their Zeppelin Air iPod Speaker.

In 2010, Cara recorded the opening song "Summer's Just Begun" for Disney's Tinker Bell and the Great Fairy Rescue as well as narrating the opening sequence. She also sang a lullaby called "Come Flying With Me" featured during the credits for the movie. It reached the Box Office Top 10 upon its national cinema release in the UK in August 2010 and is the third instalment of Disney's highly successful franchise.

In January 2012 Cara recorded the vocals on a song called "Come Dream A Dream" which forms the closing sequence of the nighttime spectacular show, Disney Dreams!, which was designed to celebrate the 20th anniversary of Disneyland Paris. In the summer of 2012 Cara performed two concerts with the Ulster Orchestra. The first was to celebrate the 150th anniversary of the Ulster Hall at an event called the Great Northern Songbook where "Hill of Thieves" was voted by BBC listeners as one of the "Top 10" original songs to come out of Northern Ireland. The second was a concert where the Ulster Orchestra joined Cara and her band in the Grand Opera House in Belfast.

== Personal life ==
Dillon is the sister of fellow folk singer Mary Dillon, formerly of Déanta.

Dillon married Sam Lakeman in December 2002. The couple live in Frome with their three children, twin sons born in 2006 and a daughter born in 2010.

Despite being diagnosed with Type 1 diabetes in 2008, Dillon has continued touring, recording and performing interviews throughout the world. She announced her illness and her strong Roman Catholic faith on Aled Jones' radio show in 2009.

== Awards and accolades ==
=== Awards and nominations ===
- 2002 Won the BBC Radio 2 Folk Award – Best Traditional Song (for "Black Is the Colour")
- 2002 Won the BBC Radio 2 Folk Award – Horizon Award (Best Newcomer)
- 2002 Nominated for BBC Radio 2 Folk Award – Folk Singer of the Year
- 2002 Nominated for BBC Radio 2 Folk Award – Best Album (for Cara Dillon)
- 2002 Won the Hot Press Award – Best Roots Act
- 2002 Won the Big Buzz Magazine Award – Best Traditional Act
- 2003 Won the Big Buzz Magazine Award – Best Traditional Act
- 2004 Won the Meteor Music Awards – Best Irish Female
- 2004 Nominated for Meteor Music Awards – Best Folk Act
- 2004 Won the Irish Tatler Woman of the Year – (Music category)
- 2005 Won the Big Buzz Magazine Award – Best Traditional Act
- 2007 Nominated for Meteor Music Awards – Best Irish Female
- 2007 Won the Indie Acoustic Project Best Celtic Album of 2006 – (for After The Morning)
- 2010 Nominated for BBC Radio 2 Folk Award – Best Traditional Song (for "Spencer The Rover")
- 2010 Nominated for BBC Radio 2 Folk Award – Folk Singer of the Year
- 2010 Won the BBC Radio 2 Folk Award – Album of the Year (for Hill of Thieves)
- 2010 Won the Spiral Earth awards – Best Female Singer
- 2010 Won the Spiral Earth Awards – Best Traditional Song – (for "Jimmy Mó Mhilé Stor")
- 2015 Nominated for BBC Radio 2 Folk Award – Folk Singer of the Year
- 2018 Nominated for BBC Radio 2 Folk Award – Folk Singer of the Year

=== Other accolades ===
- 2001 BBC Radio 3/FRoots Critics Poll No. 7 (for Cara Dillon)
- 2001 HMV Choice Reader's Poll No. 12 Best Albums (for Cara Dillon)
- 2004 HMV Choice Reader's Poll No. 9 Trad/Folk Section (for Sweet Liberty)
- 2006 Mixmag No. 1 Trance track of 2006 (for Cara Dillon vs 2Devine – "Black Is the Colour")
- 2006 Mixmag No. 21 Top 100 Tunes of 2006 (for Cara Dillon vs 2Devine – "Black Is the Colour")
- 2006 Radio 2 Folk No. 4 Top 10 Albums of 2006 (for After The Morning)
- 2010 Tinker Bell and the Great Fairy Rescue she sings "Come Flying With Me" and "Summer's Just Begun"
- 2012 Great Northern Songbook – "The Hill of Thieves" voted in the Top 10 original songs to come out of Northern Ireland by BBC Listeners
