= Moloney, O'Connell & Keane =

Irish folk trio

- Genres: Irish Folk music
- Years active: Early 1980s
- Past members: Mick Moloney; Robbie O'Connell; Jimmy Keane

Moloney, O'Connell & Keane is an early 1980s folk trio of traditional Irish music made up of guitarist and singer-songwriter Robbie O'Connell, banjoist and singer Mick Moloney and piano accordion virtuoso Jimmy Keane. The trio released two critically acclaimed albums: There Were Roses in 1985 (including the first recording of the iconic Irish song "There Were Roses" that was penned by the famous Irish folk singer-songwriter Tommy Sands but recorded first by the trio) and the album Kilkelly in 1987 including O'Connell's signature song "Killkelly".

== Green Fields of America ==
Green Fields of America
- Origin: USA
- Genres: Irish Folk music
- Years active: Late 1980s
- Past members: Mick Moloney; Robbie O'Connell; Jimmy Keane; Eileen Ivers; Séamus Egan; Donny Golden; Eileen Golden

Later on in the 1980s, all three became part of the revamped Green Fields of America an ensemble which performed and promoted Irish traditional music in the United States that included O'Connell, Moloney, Keane, plus fiddler Eileen Ivers (from Riverdance), multi-instrumentalist Séamus Egan (from Solas) and Donny and Eileen Golden. They recorded the album called The Green Fields of America: Live released in 1989.

== Discography ==
As Moloney, O'Connell & Keane

- There Were Roses • Moloney, O'Connell & Keane • Green Linnet CSIF 1057 (1985)
- Kilkelly • Moloney, O'Connell & Keane • Green Linnet CSIF 1072 (1987)

As Green Fields of America

- The Green Fields of America Live in Concert • Green Linnet CSIF 1096 (1989)
