= Fiddler's Green International Festival =

Annual folk music and cultural festival in Rostrevor, Northern Ireland

- Festival Logo
- Genre: Folk, Irish traditional music
- Dates: July
- Locations: Rostrevor, County Down, Northern Ireland
- Years active: 1987-Present
- Website: fiddlersgreenfestival.com

The Fiddler's Green International Festival is an annual folk music and cultural festival held in Rostrevor, County Down, Northern Ireland. Established in 1987, the festival has become one of the longest-running and most respected folk festivals on the island of Ireland. It typically takes place over the course of a week in late July.

== Overview ==
The festival features a wide variety of events including concerts, workshops, art exhibitions, storytelling sessions, poetry readings, céilís, and outdoor performances. Programming ranges from traditional Irish music to contemporary folk and world music, with performances taking place in venues throughout Rostrevor, including churches, schools, pubs, An Cuan, and open-air stages. In addition to music, the festival places a strong emphasis on community involvement, culture, and the arts. Family-friendly activities and events for all ages are a core part of the festival ethos. Fiddler's Green has become a major cultural event in the calendar of Rostrevor and the surrounding area, drawing thousands of visitors annually.

Signature events of the festival include an open-air performance in the Fiddler's Green meadow in Kilbroney Park, the "20 Singers, 20 Songs" variety show, the nightly Festival Folk Club in St. Bronagh’s Social Club, and the "Music of Healing" event curated by Tommy Sands featuring music and dialogue among guest speakers with diverse political and religious views.

== History ==
The festival was founded in 1987 by a group of local musicians and community members who wanted to celebrate the region's rich folk traditions and the musical heritage of Rostrevor. Named after the mythical “Fiddler’s Green,” a sailor’s paradise of eternal music and merriment, the festival was inspired by the spirit of traditional Irish music and the storytelling culture of the Mourne region. Over the years, the festival has grown significantly in scale. It has hosted prominent local and international artists, as well as serving as a platform for emerging local talent.

== Notable artists and contributors ==
Local singer-songwriter Tommy Sands, known for his music and peace activism, has been a recurring presence and a key figure in the festival's development alongside other members of his family band, The Sands Family. The festival has welcomed a range of celebrated artists over the years, including musicians such as Sean McGuire, Tommy Makem, The Dubliners, The Clancy Brothers, De Dannan, Paul Brady, Clannad, Seán Keane, Dana, and Cara Dillon, as well as other creators such as the poet Seamus Heaney and Irish language advocate Linda Ervine.

== Annual awards ==
The festival presents two annual awards. The Fiddler's Green Festival Hall of Fame Award is awarded to "an individual or group who has made an outstanding contribution to Irish Music and Tradition". The Fiddler’s Green Festival Creative Arts Award "acknowledges achievement in the Arts & Literacy field".

Fiddler's Green Festival Hall of Fame Award Recipients
Year	Recipient
1987	Seán Maguire
1988	David Hammond
1989	Tommy Makem
1990	Joe Burke
1991	Mick Moloney
1992	Moya Brennan
1993	Liam O'Flynn
1994	The Clancy Brothers & Robbie O'Connell
1995	Dolores Keane
1996	The Dubliners
1997	De Dannan
1998	Altan
1999	Finbar Furey
2000	The Sands Family
2001	Andy Irvine
2002	Ronnie Drew
2003	Boys of the Lough
2004	Paddy Moloney
2005	Dónal Lunny
2006	Cathal Hayden
2007	Sweeney's Men; The McPeakes
2008	Mary Black
2009	Máirtín O'Connor
2010	Matt Molloy
2011	Paddy Glackin
2012	The MacConnell Brothers
2013	Sharon Shannon
2014	Joanie Madden & Cherish the Ladies
2015	Steve Cooney & Séamus Begley
2016	Brian & Eithne Vallely
2017	Martin Hayes
2018	Na Píobairí Uilleann
2019	Clannad
2022	Flook
2023	Dervish
2024	Paul Brady
2025	Seán Keane
2026	Muireann Nic Amhlaoibh

Fiddler's Green Festival Creative Arts Award Recipients
Year	Recipient
2000	Seamus Heaney
2001	John B. Vallely
2002	Tony McAuley
2003	Liam Clancy
2004	Tom Newman
2005	Mícheál Ó Súilleabháin
2006	Ralph McTell
2007	Steve Cooney
2008	Pete Seeger
2009	Suibhan O’Dubhain
2010	Tom Paxton
2011	Liam Ó Maonlaí
2012	John Sheahan
2013	Bill Whelan
2014	Martin Lynch
2015	The Quiet Meadow Makers
2016	Mickey MacConnell
2017	Shay Healy
2018	Pádraigín Ní Uallacháin
2019	Peggy Seeger
2022	Iarla Ó Lionáird
2023	Archie Fisher
2024	Linda Ervine
2025	Pat Jennings
2026	Luka Bloom
