= Kilkelly, Ireland (song) =

Single
- Released: 1983
- Genre: Ballad
- Songwriter: Peter Jones

"Kilkelly, Ireland" is a contemporary ballad composed by American songwriter Peter Jones. It tells the story of an Irish family whose son emigrated to America, via a series of letters sent from the father back in Kilkelly. It has five stanzas, covering the period from 1860 to 1892.

== Background ==
In the late 1970s or early 1980s, Peter Jones discovered a collection of century-old letters in his parents' attic in Bethesda, Maryland. The letters had been sent by his great-great-great-grandfather, Byran Hunt, to his son, Jones' great-great-grandfather, John Hunt, (Note: One source has the surname as Coyne.) who had emigrated from Kilkelly, County Mayo, to the United States in 1855 and worked on the railroad. As Byran was illiterate, the letters were dictated to the local schoolmaster, Pat McNamara (d. 1902), who often wrote letters on behalf of his neighbors who were unable to read and write.

Covering the years 1858 to 1892, the Hunt letters shared family news of births, deaths, and marriages, and reports of the annual harvest. One letter reported that Michael, a brother who had "got in a wee bit of trouble" and joined John in America, was returning and was thinking of buying land. John Hunt was never far from his father's thoughts and the letters expressed the love and affection his family in Ireland still held for him. The last letter, dated February 1892, was written by John Hunt's brother, D. Hunt, informing him of the death of their father. Peter Jones decided to compose a ballad based on the contents of the letters.

== Description ==
Presented as a series of letters, the ballad has five stanzas covering the time period from 1860 to 1892. The ballad conveys "the effects of poverty, famine and emigration on one Irish family" while also expressing the universal theme of the sadness and longing experienced by families who have been separated permanently by emigration.

== Covers ==
"Kilkelly, Ireland" was first recorded on Fast Folk Musical Magazine (FF 207, September 1983) by Laura Burns and Roger Rosen in New York; a live version performed by an ensemble including Nikki Matheson, Jack Hardy, Robin Batteau and Richard Meyer at The Bottom Line in Greenwich Village was also released on Fast Folk in 1986 (FF 306 Live from the Bottom Line). It was subsequently recorded in Ireland by Danny Doyle on his album Twenty Years A-Growing (1987). The ballad appeared on the 1990s Irish music album Bringing It All Back Home. It has been covered by many artists, including Robbie O'Connell, Mick Moloney, Jimmy Keane, Atwater-Donnelly, Seamus Kennedy, The Dubliners, Seán Keane, Ciara Considine, Marc Gunn, Deirdre Starr, and David Gans (with Eric Rawlins).

In 2023 the song was, with the consent of the authors, translated to Polish by songwriter Maciej Wronski and recorded by Polish artist Reflinka under the title "Listy z Kilkelly".

== Sources ==
- Cronin, Mike (2008), "'Uíbh Fhalí, how I miss you with your heather scented air': Music, locality, and the Gaelic Athletic Association in Ireland", in Bateman, Anthony; Bale, John (eds.), Sporting Sounds: Relationships between sport and music, Routledge, ISBN 978-1134067442
- Healey, Joseph F. (2011). Race, Ethnicity, Gender, and Class: The sociology of group conflict and change. Pine Forge Press. ISBN 978-1412987318.
- O'Connor, Nuala (2001). Bringing it All Back Home: The influence of Irish music at home and overseas (2nd ed.). Merlin. ISBN 1903582032. "Kilkelly"
- Williams, W.H.A. (1996). 'Twas Only an Irishman's Dream: The image of Ireland and the Irish in American popular song lyrics, 1800-1920. University of Illinois Press. ISBN 0252065514.
