= Jimmy Keane =

English musician

- Born: May 8, 1958 (age 68); London, England
- Genres: Irish folk, Contemporary
- Occupation: Musician
- Instrument: Piano accordion
- Years active: 1970s – present
- Labels: Shanachie, Green Linnet, Bohola Music, CDBaby, Not On Label, Imeartas, Cappal Beag
- Website: www.jimmykeane.com

Jimmy Keane (born May 8, 1958) is a London-born English musician of Irish origin and a specialist piano accordion player. In addition to his solo career, in the 1980s he was part of the folk trio Moloney, O'Connell & Keane, then in ensemble Green Fields of America. In the 1990s, he was in Aengus and formed the group bohola with Pat Broaders and Seán Cleland. He has recorded and produced a number of albums.

== Career ==
Keane was born to Irish-speaking parents originating from Connemara and County Kerry. His father Jimmy Keane was an old style sean-nós singer. Both of his parents encouraged him to take up Irish traditional music. Playing the piano accordion, he won five consecutive All-Ireland titles and many accolades. In the 1970s, he started his professional career with fellow All-Ireland fiddle champion Liz Carroll in Chicago and the duo was named All-Ireland Senior Duet Champion in 1975.

In the early 1980s, he joined with guitarist and singer-songwriter Robbie O'Connell and banjoist and singer Mick Moloney to form Moloney, O'Connell & Keane, releasing two albums: There Were Roses in 1985 (including the first recording of the iconic Irish song "There Were Roses" penned by the Irish folk singer-songwriter Tommy Sands and Kilkelly in 1987, including O'Connell's signature song "Kilkelly".

In the mid-1980s, he became part of the revamped Green Fields of America an ensemble which performs and promotes Irish traditional music in the United States with Mick Moloney, Robbie O'Connell, fiddler Eileen Ivers (from Riverdance), multi-instrumentalist Seamus Egan (from Solas) and Donny and Eileen Golden, recording an album called The Green Fields of America: Live in Concert in 1989.

During the late 1980s, Keane collaborated with guitarist Dennis Cahill (of Martin Hayes and Dennis Cahill fame).

In the mid-1990s, Keane and O'Connell formed the group Aengus and recorded All on a Christmas Morning for the RCA Victor label.

Keane founded the group bohola in 1999 with Pat Broaders (bouzouki, dord and vocal) and Seán Cleland (fiddle, viola). bohola released several albums on the Shanachie and bohola music labels, performing traditional Irish tunes and songs as well as more contemporarily composed tunes and songs of the same genre. The 2008 bohola release, Jimmy Keane & Pat Broaders was awarded "Celtic Album of the Year" from Just Plain Folks and "Vocal/Instrumental Album of the Year".

Keane won "Male Musician of the Year" from the Irish American News (2010), "Male Musician of the Decade" by Live Ireland and the Irish American News (2011).

Keane was also featured in the BBC TV series and compilation recording Bringing It All Back Home, and was featured on the soundtrack and recording for the PBS documentary Out of Ireland. He also co-wrote the soundtrack for the PBS documentary Irish Chicago.

== Discography ==
With Mick Moloney and Robbie O’Connell

- There Were Roses (with Liz Carroll) (Green Linnet, 1986)
- Kilkelly (Green Linnet, 1987)

With Niamh Ní Charra

- Cuz - A Tribute To Terry "Cuz" Teahan (Imeartas IMCD004, 2013) [Keane plays on two tracks]

With Bohola

- Bohola (Not On Label, 2001) (Shanachie 78048, 2002)
- 4 (Shanachie 78058, 2004)
- Jimmy Keane and Pat Broaders (Shanachie and Bohola Music, 2008)
- BO-HO-HO-HOLA (CDBaby, 2008)

Singles & EPs

- St. Andrews (Cappal Beag NR 15842)
