= There Were Roses =

Irish folk song

Single by Tommy Sands

from the album Singing of the Times
- B-side: "The Woman At The Barn"
- Released: 1985
- Genre: Irish folk
- Label: Spring
- Songwriter: Tommy Sands
- Producer: Colum Sands

"There Were Roses" is an Irish folk song based on a true story. It was written by the Northern Ireland folk singer and songwriter Tommy Sands.

It was first recorded in 1985 by Robbie O'Connell, Mick Moloney and Jimmy Keane as the title track of their first joint album titled There Were Roses and incorrectly credited to "Moloney, O'Connell & Keane" on the Green Linnet label. Tommy Sands had also recorded his own song and it was the opening track of his 1985 album Singing of the Times on the Spring Records label.

== Context ==
"There Were Roses" has been described as one of the best songs ever written about the Irish conflict known as The Troubles. The song recounts the true story of two men, "Allan Bell" from Benagh, a Protestant and "Sean O'Malley" from South Armagh, a Catholic. The two were very close friends despite the political strife between the Catholic and Protestant communities. They would meet at Ryan Road, near Mayobridge in South County Down, where the Sands family have a farm. The Sands family were all musicians and singers and their house was a focal point for Catholic and Protestant neighbours to enjoy music and craic. That's how Sands had met them and "who were both good friends of mine" as in the lyrics. Sands had originally recorded the song using the real names of the two men, Isaac Scott and Sean McDonnell, and did so with the agreement of their families. But just prior to the release of the album there was a change of heart on the part of one of the families. The already pressed LPs were destroyed and a new version of the song recorded using the fictitious names Bell and O'Malley.

The song recounts the murder of 'Allan' just outside Newry Town by the Republican paramilitaries. In the aftermath, Loyalist paramilitaries "came prowling 'round the lonely Ryan Road' for a Catholic to kill in retaliation; ironically, the man they selected for the revenge killing ("to even up the score" as in the lyrics), was 'Sean' who pleaded for his life but he was not spared.

Sands comments in the song lyrics: "I wonder just how many wars are fought between good friends / And those that give the orders are not the ones to die / It's Bell and O'Malley and the likes of you and I", concluding:

There were roses, roses
There were roses
And the tears of the people
Ran together

The 'roses' in the title and chorus reflects Sands's memory of that summer and the roses blooming in an arch surrounding a seat outside his family home. In the album that Sands released there is no indication about the actual names of the two victims that Sands knew. The events of the song took place in the summer of 1973 and it took Sands ten years after the murders of the two friends to write the song.

In certain cover versions, the names of the two young men are changed and "Allan Bell" is replaced by "Isaac Scott" and "Sean O'Malley" by "Sean McDonnell". For example, in the very well known Cara Dillon version on her album Sweet Liberty.

== Covers and adaptations ==
It has also been performed or recorded by Sean Keane, Paddy Reilly, Cara Dillon (this version was recorded for the TV series Billy Connolly’s World Tour of England, Ireland and Wales), Lisa McHugh, John Whelan and Friends, The Masterless Men, and many others.

== Awards ==
In 2004 Sands and "There Were Roses" received the award for 'Best Original Song' at the BBC Radio 2 Folk Awards.

== In popular culture ==
In May 2002 Sands received an Honorary Doctorate from the University of Nevada, Reno for his outstanding work as musician and ambassador for peace and understanding.

The song has also been translated into many languages and is currently included in the English language syllabus in German secondary schools.
