= Robbie O'Connell =

Irish singer-songwriter (born 1950)

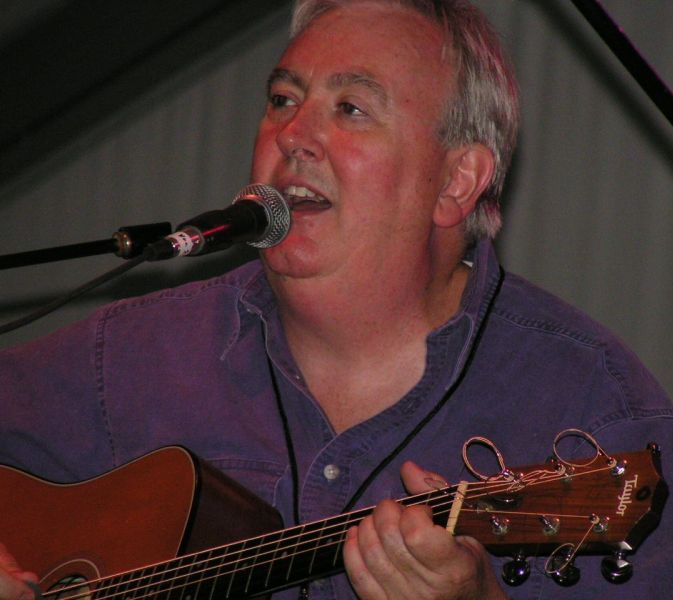
- Robbie O'Connell at the Dublin Irish Fest (Ohio, 2006)

Background information
- Born: Robert O'Connell; 28 December 1950 (age 75); County Waterford, Ireland
- Genres: Irish Folk; contemporary
- Occupations: Singer; songwriter; musician
- Instruments: Vocals; guitar; mandolin
- Years active: 1970s–present
- Website: www.robbieoconnell.com

Robert 'Robbie' O'Connell (born 28 December 1950) is an Irish singer songwriter who performs solo, as well as with The Green Fields of America. He also appears with Dónal Clancy (cousin), Dan Milner, and fiddler Rose Clancy. O'Connell has also toured and recorded with The Clancy Brothers, being their nephew. For over 20 years, he has conducted small cultural tours to Ireland with Celtica Music & Tours and, for more than ten years, WGBH Learning Tours. Married with four grown children, he now spends his time between Bristol, Rhode Island and Waterford.

== Early life ==
Robbie O'Connell was born in 1950 in St. John's Parish, Waterford, Ireland, to Seán and Cáit (née Clancy) O'Connell. His early years were spent on the Cork Road, Waterford. When he was 7, his family moved to his mother's home town of Carrick-on-Suir where they established a guesthouse, Mount Richard. When Cáit's brother Bobby returned from New York in the mid-1950s, he suggested that they should convert the cellar to a folk music venue where they could hold ballad and music sessions. Very soon, Mount Richard – and later, Tinvane Hotel – became a thriving venue that hosted the likes of Seamus Ennis, Dolly MacMahon, Leo Rowsome, Jean Ritchie and others. It was in this atmosphere that Robbie and his sister Alice began to play (guitar) and sing folk and traditional music. They formed a group called The Rotary Folk with Sean Rattigan and Noel Carroll, which went on to win the Kilkenny Beer Festival in the late 1960s.

During his years at University College Dublin, he traveled to the United States during the summer to perform on the Irish music circuit. In 1972, he met singer Roxanne Vigeant. They performed together as "Robbie & Roxanne" and then as "The Munster Cloak" with bassist Tony Riordan. They were married in 1974, settling in Acton, Massachusetts. They moved to Ireland in 1976 following the death of his mother in a car accident in Wexford. Robbie formed The Bread & Beer Band with friends Tommy Keane, Paul Grant and Martin Murray. Two of their four children were born during this time. The ballad sessions continued at Tinvane Hotel with frequent appearances by Dermot Morgan (Father Ted), Paddy Glackin, Colum and Tommy Sands, and piper Tommy Kearney.

== Joining the Clancy Brothers ==
A nephew of the Clancy Brothers, O'Connell began touring with Paddy, Tom, and Bobby Clancy in 1977, taking the place of Liam Clancy who was working with Tommy Makem as a part of Makem and Clancy. O'Connell sang, played guitar and, occasionally, mandolin. In 1979 he and his family moved to Franklin, Massachusetts.

Beginning in 1977, the Clancy Brothers and Robbie O'Connell toured three months each year in March, August, and November in the United States. O'Connell, who had been a songwriter since his early teens, composed several songs that the group sang regularly, such as "Bobby's Britches," "Ferrybank Piper," and "You're Not Irish." He also included songs written by others, such as "Dear Boss" and "Sister Josephine." Reviews cited O'Connell as a fresh addition to the group and with his original compositions, the future of the group.

With the release in 1982 of his first solo album, Close to the Bone, O'Connell emerged as an artist of major stature. He began touring with Mick Moloney and Jimmy Keane, and also with Eileen Ivers and Séamus Egan in the Green Fields of America. Moloney, O'Connell & Keane recorded two albums, both of which garnered critical acclaim. The first was There Were Roses released in 1985 with the title track, the song "There Were Roses", penned by Tommy Sands. Second was Kilkelly in 1987, containing the title track "Kilkelly". Both albums were released on the Green Linnet label.

O'Connell continued to perform part-time with the Clancy brothers for nineteen years. In 1992 he performed at Carnegie Hall with them and also sang and played the guitar on the telecast of a live tribute to Bob Dylan at Madison Square Garden.

In 1996 Liam Clancy and O'Connell left the Clancy Brothers and formed their own duo, called simply Liam Clancy and Robbie O'Connell. Before splitting, the Clancy Brothers and Robbie O'Connell gave a farewell tour of both Ireland and America in February and March 1996. The Irish tour in February was filmed near the Clancys' hometown, televised and later released to video and DVD as The Clancy Brothers and Robbie O'Connell: Farewell to Ireland.

== Career after the Clancy Brothers ==
Liam Clancy and Robbie O'Connell toured for a while as a duo, but very soon added Liam's son Dónal Clancy to the group, forming the trio Clancy, O'Connell & Clancy. The trio released two albums, a self-titled debut album in 1997 and an album of sea songs in 1998, The Wild and Wasteful Ocean. O'Connell regards the self-titled Clancy, O'Connell and Clancy album as one of his favourite works. In 1999, with Liam in Ireland, O'Connell in Massachusetts and Dónal in New York, the trio decided to call it quits as a full-time group. They occasionally regrouped for concerts, but as Liam's health declined, these were infrequent.

In 2000 the Milwaukee Irish Fest had its 20th anniversary, and in celebration the entire performing Clancy family sang together on one stage at the festival. This once-in-a-lifetime line-up included Robbie O'Connell, Dónal, Liam, Bobby, Finbarr, and Aoife Clancy, along with friend Eddie Dillon, a collaborator of Bobby's. In 2006 O'Connell began an ongoing collaboration with his cousins Aoife and Dónal Clancy. The Clancy Legacy. Their first CD together was released in 2010.

In addition to his solo career, O'Connell also performs with Mick Moloney, The Green Fields of America, The Clancy Legacy, and occasionally with Dan Milner, Ed Miller, and Rose Clancy.

In 1995, O'Connell began hosting "Heart of Ireland" cultural tours wherein he would escort small groups of people to Ireland, concentrating on the musical and cultural traditions of particular areas. In 2003, WGBH radio host Brian O'Donovan asked O'Connell if he would use his expertise to put together and participate in a 'GBH Learning Tour. Both tours continue to run annually.

== Partial discography ==
Solo

- Close to the Bone (1982)
- The Love of the Land (1989)
- Never Learned to Dance (1993)
- Humorous Songs – Live (1998)
- Recollections (2002)

With The Clancy Brothers

- Wild & Wasteful Ocean • Clancy, O'Connell & Clancy (1998)
- Clancy, O'Connell & Clancy • HLV 2001 (1997)
- The Clancy Brothers and Robbie O’Connell Live • Clancy Brothers & Robbie O'Connell • Vanguard VSD9445
- Tunes 'n' Tales of Ireland • The Clancy Brothers & Robbie O’Connell • Folk Era FE2061
- Older But No Wiser • The Clancy Brothers & Robbie O'Connell • Vanguard 79488-2

As The Clancy Legacy

- The Clancy Legacy • The Clancy Legacy

As Aengus

- All on a Christmas Morning (RCA Victor, 1998)

As Moloney, O'Connell & Keane

- There Were Roses • Moloney, O'Connell & Keane • Green Linnet CSIF 1057 (1985)
- Kilkelly • Moloney, O'Connell & Keane • Green Linnet CSIF1072 (1987)

As Green Fields of America

- The Green Fields of America: Live in Concert • Green Linnet CSIF 1096 (1998)
- The Green Fields of America • The Green Fields of America • Compass 2009

Compilation albums

- Absolutely Irish • Live Concert Recording
- A Christmas Celtic Sojourn - Live • Live Concert Recording
- Irish Songs from Old New England • Compilation
- The Rights of Man • Compilation • Green Linnet CSIF 1111
- Sing Out America • Compilation • Folk Era FE2063
- The Celts Rise Again • Compilation • Green Linnet 10429
- Bringing It All Back Home • Compilation • BBC CD 844
- Comfort & Joy: A Celtic Christmas Sojourn • Compilation • Rounder 2003
- Dear Jean: Artists Celebrate Jean Ritchie • Compilation • Compass Records
- Mystic Seaport 24th Annual Sea Music Festival • Live Concert Compilation • Mystic Seaport

== Video footage ==
- The Clancy Brothers & Robbie O'Connell – Farewell To Ireland

== Writings ==
Clean Cabbage in the Bucket (And Other Tales From The Irish Music Trenches), co-written with Seamus Kennedy, Dennis O'Rourke, Harry O'Donoghue and Frank Emerson.
