= Green Fields of America =

Irish-American musical ensemble

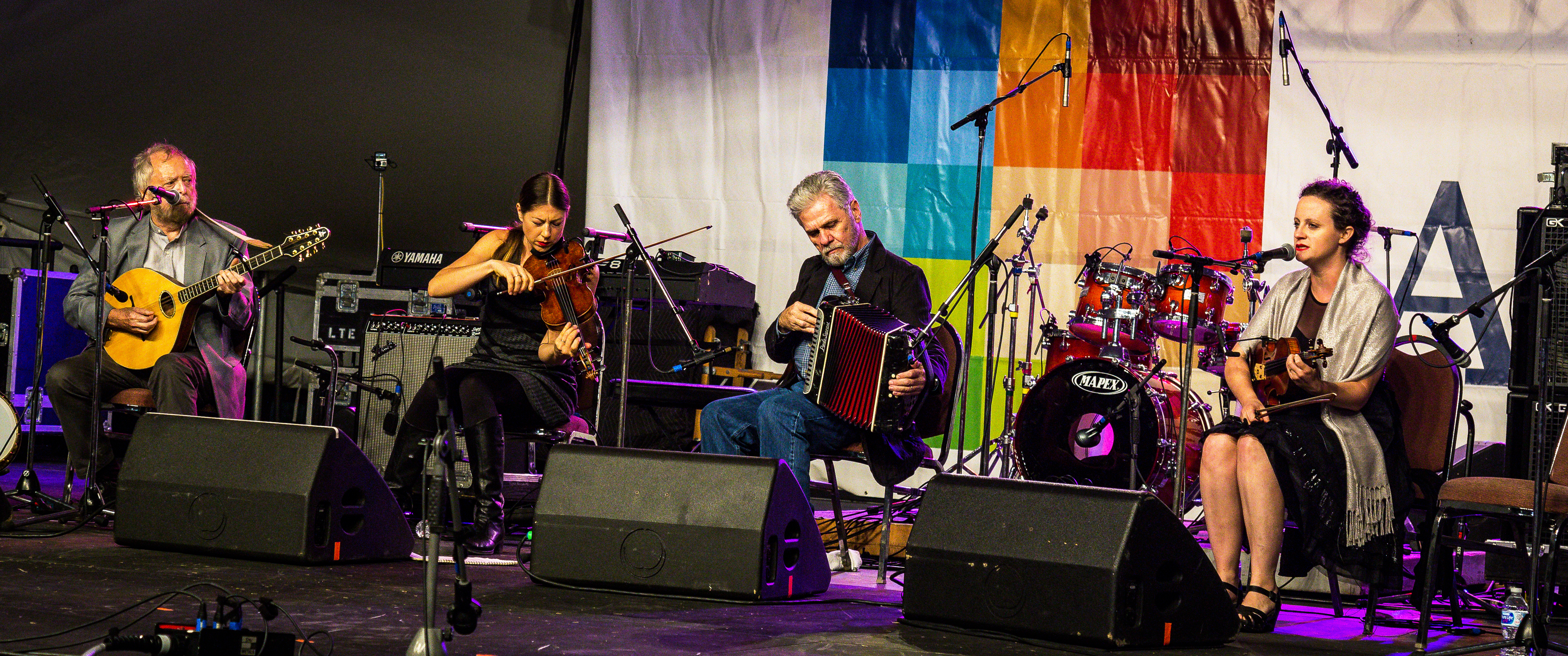
Green Fields of America in Richmond Folk Fest 2017

The Green Fields of America is an ensemble that performs and promotes Irish traditional music in the United States. It was formed in 1977 in Philadelphia, led by musician and folklorist Mick Moloney. They perform Irish and Irish-American culture with American musicians and dancers. They are named after the traditional ballad The Green Fields of America.

== Origin ==
As a student in Philadelphia, Moloney met the director of the Smithsonian Folklife Festival, who encouraged him to gather a set of performers for the 1976 festival. This received a positive response, and Moloney decided to form an ensemble that would bring together Irish vocal, instrumental, and dance traditions at concerts and festivals. Moloney cofounded the Green Fields of America in 1977.

== Work ==
The critically acclaimed album The Green Fields of America Live in Concert in 1989 subtitled "Irish Music, Song and Dance in America" credited Mick Moloney, Robbie O'Connell, Jimmy Keane (all three members of the famous Moloney, O'Connell & Keane trio) and Eileen Ivers, Séamus Egan, Donny Golden and Eileen Golden. Many had their performing starts with The Green Fields, including Egan, Ivers, Golden, Marie Reilly, Jean Butler and Michael Flatley.

Playing such venues as Carnegie Hall, Wolf Trap, the Smithsonian Institution, the Festival of American Folklife (now the Smithsonian Folklife Festival), the Milwaukee Irish Fest, and The National Folk Festival, the five members of the band at the time – Liz Carroll, Jack Coen, Michael Flatley, Donny Golden and Mick Moloney – have all received National Heritage Awards. Radio Telefís Éireann, Ireland’s national broadcaster, commemorated the twentieth-anniversary of the group on St. Patrick's Day, 1999.

A nationally televised documentary on their history and cultural contributions was presented. Among the musicians joining Mick Moloney for the performance at Re-Imagining Ireland, were singer-songwriter Robbie O'Connell, Jerry O'Sullivan (uilleann pipes), and the dancers Donny Golden and Sinead Lawlor. Old-time fiddler, guitarist, banjoist, and singer Bruce Molsky and singer-composer Tommy Sands were also guest appearances.

As of 2018, membership in the group consisted of Moloney, O'Connell, long-time associate Billy McComiskey (button-accordion), Athena Tergis (fiddle), Liz Hanley (fiddle and vocals), Brenda Castles (concertina and vocals), Brendan Dolan (keyboards) and Niall O'Leary (Irish dance and spoons).

== Recordings ==
- The Green Fields of America Live in Concert • Green Linnet CSIF 1096 (1989)
- The Greenfields of America • The Greenfields of America • Compass 2009
