= After the Morning (The Sands Family album) =

- Original cover designed by Ronnie Norton.

Studio album by The Sands Family
- Released: 1976
- Recorded: 1976, Dublin Sound Studios, Dublin
- Genre: Folk
- Language: English
- Label: EMI Ireland
- Producer: Leo O'Kelly

The Sands Family chronology
You'll Be Well Looked After (1975)	After the Morning (1976)	Live (1976)

After the Morning is the sixth album by Irish band The Sands Family and the first recorded after the death of Eugene Sands who was killed in November 1975 in a motor accident in Germany. It was released in 1976 in Ireland by EMI Ireland and produced by Leo O'Kelly.

== Track listing ==
All songs are traditional except where noted. All arrangements by The Sands Family.

Side one
No.	Title	Writer(s)	Length
1.	"Don't Call Me Early in the Morning"	Tommy Sands
2.	"Wise Nora"
3.	"Árd Tí Cuain"
4.	"Almost Every Circumstance"	Colum Sands
5.	"Finnegan's Mill"
6.	"No Rest For the Dancer (Theo's Gone to Turkey, The Hut in the Bog, The Geese in the Bog, Johnny McEljohn)"

Side two
No.	Title	Writer(s)	Length
7.	"Dunne"
8.	"Goodbye John-Joe"	Ben Sands
9.	"Streets of Derry"
10.	"Jig Selection: Meg Long's & Felix the Wrestler"
11.	"The Band Played Waltzing Matilda"	Eric Bogle
12.	"Mourne Rambler"	Tommy Sands

== Personnel ==
The Sands Family

- Tommy Sands – vocals, guitar, five-strings banjo
- Anne Sands – vocals, bodhran
- Ben Sands – vocals, guitar, mandolin, tin whistle, fiddles, sitar, viola
- Colum Sands – vocals, guitar, double bass, fiddles, bouzouki, dulcimer, tenor banjo

Production

- Leo O'Kelly – production
- Bob Harper – engineering
- Ronnie Norton – cover design
- Gangolf Dörr – front cover photography
- Bobby Hanvey & Irish Press – back cover photography

== Release history ==
Region	Date	Label	Format	Catalog
Ireland	1976	EMI Ireland	stereo LP	LEAF 7012
