= After the Morning =

After the Morning may refer to:

- After the Morning (Cara Dillon album), 2006
- After the Morning (1979 John Hicks album)
- After the Morning (1992 John Hicks album)
- After the Morning (Katie McMahon album), by Katie McMahon (1998)
- After the Morning (The Sands Family album), 1976
