= Tad Marks =

American musician

Tad Marks (born 1954) is an American folk and bluegrass fiddle player.

== Music ==
Marks spent his youth in Ambler, Pennsylvania, and studied music composition and arts at Penn State University. He has won numerous awards for fiddling, and is currently a violin repairman and bluegrass/folk fiddler in the Baltimore/Washington DC area.

Marks has performed and toured with many bluegrass, country and Celtic acts and is widely recorded. He has played and performed with Bob Doyle and the Allegheny String Band, the Twigg Brothers, Buzz Busby, Bill Harrell, Whetstone Run, Hazel Dickens, Ola Belle Reed, Wade and Julia Mainer, Del McCoury, and many other folk, bluegrass and country artists. In addition to his work with the Del McCoury Band, Marks has performed with Lynn Morris, James King, Kate MacKenzie, Charlie Zahm, and Bob Perilla's Big Hillbilly Bluegrass. He has also recorded for soundtracks and worked for a time recording jingles and music for television commercials.

== Discography ==
=== CDs ===
- Tad Marks – Callin' in the Dogs
- Tad Marks – Our Crazy Love Affair
- Tad Marks – The Back Road Road
- Tad Marks – The Highlander's Farewell
- The Del McCoury Band – Blue Side of Town
- The Del McCoury Band – High Lonesome and Blue
- The Del McCoury Band – By Request
- Charlie Zahm – Festival Favorites 2
- Charlie Zahm – The Celtic Balladeer
- Charlie Zahm – A Walk in the Irish Rain
- Charlie Zahm – The White Snows of Winter
- Charlie Zahm – Americana
- Charlie Zahm – Out of the Mist
- Charlie Zahm – Lighthouse on the Shore
- Charlie Zahm – The American Scrapbook
- Charlie Zahm – Among the Heather
- Charlie Zahm – Recent Journeys
- Charlie Zahm – Songs of Highlands, Islands and Home
- Esther Haynes
- Danny Doyle – Spirit of the Gael
- Seamus Kennedy – A Smile and a Tear
- Seamus Kennedy – Party Pieces
- Seamus Kennedy – Sailing Ships and Sailing Men
- The King Brothers
- David Massey – Blissful State of Blue
- Bob Perilla's Big Hillbilly Bluegrass-Big Hillbilly Bluegrass
- Bob Perilla – Chesapeake Moon
- Kevin Marvelle – Love's the Reason
- Marti Brom – Not For Nothin'

=== DVD ===
- Bob Perilla's Big Hillbilly Bluegrass – A Bluegrass Band's Tour of Armenia
- Charlie Zahm – Lighthouse on the Shore
