= The Sands Family =

Northern Irish musical family band

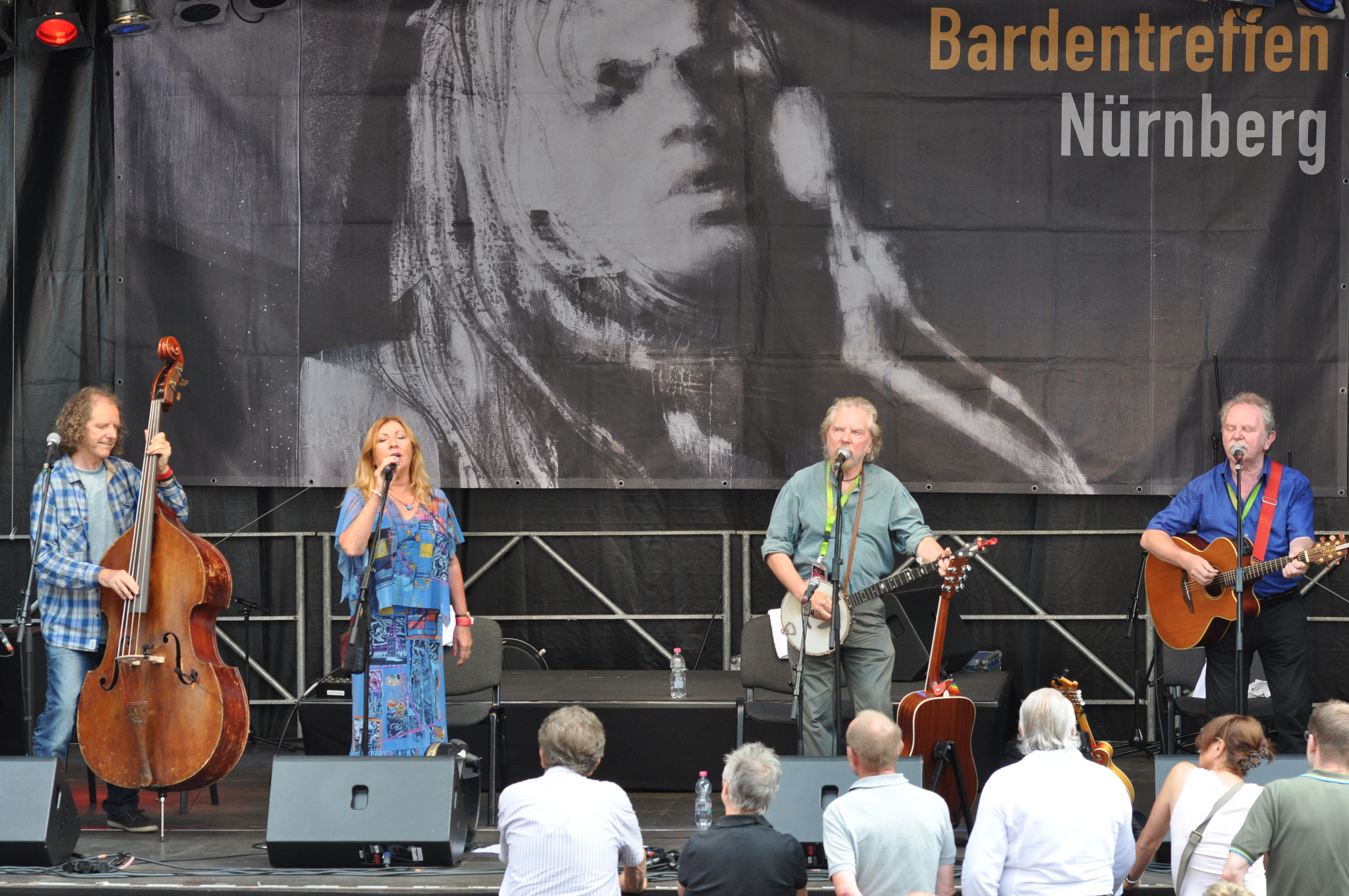
- The Sands Family at the Bardentreffen festival 2014

Background information
- Origin: Mayobridge, County Down, Northern Ireland
- Genres: Irish folk
- Years active: C.1970 - present
- Members: Tommy Sands; Colum Sands; Ben Sands; Anne Sands
- Past members: Eugene Sands
- Website: www.sandsfamilyfolk.com

This is about the family band. And Ben ** For coverage of solo careers of some band members, see Tommy Sands and Colum Sands

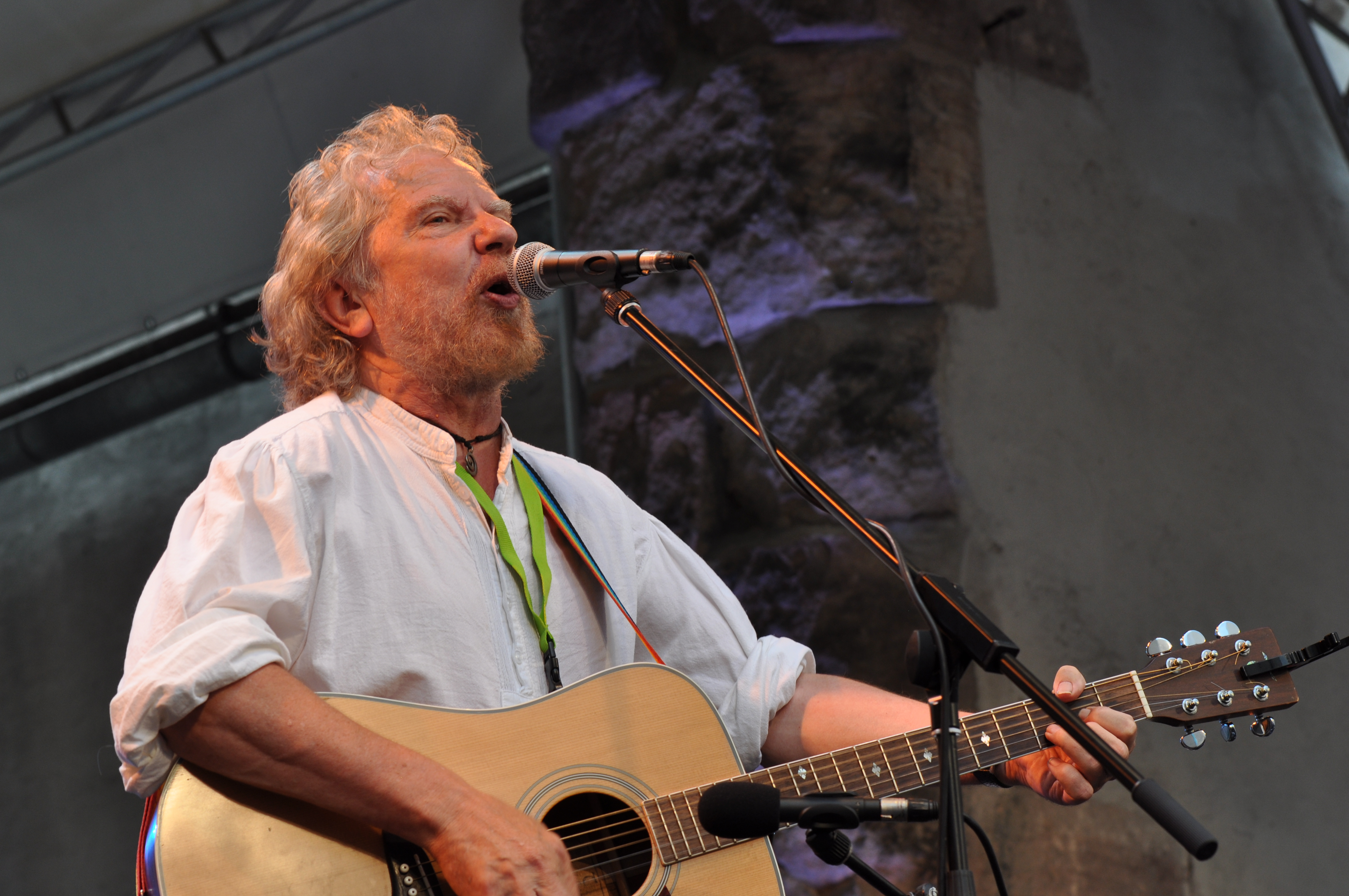
Tommy Sands at the Nuremberg Bardentreffen world music festival 2014

The Sands Family is a Northern Irish musical family band originating from Mayobridge, County Down, Northern Ireland. Their repertoire largely consists of their own compositions as well as traditional Irish songs. The band is considered one of the most influential folk groups. It showcases the famous Northern Irish folk singer-songwriter Tommy Sands as lead singer and songwriter and his brothers Ben Sands, Colum Sands and Eugene Sands and sister Anne Sands. Eugene was killed in a car accident in 1975 and the formation became a 4-member band. Tommy, Colum and Ben Sands have also successful solo careers as singers and musicians.

The Sands came from a very musical and artistic family. Their parents both came from families of singers, musicians and storytellers and encouraged a love of Irish culture and tradition in their seven children, Mary, the eldest, Hugh, Ben, Tommy, Colum, Eugene and Anne. Their mother Bridie Connolly, was an accordionist, and the daughter of the 'Burren poet', Owen Connolly, and her mother was related to the Brontë family.

The Sands family grew up in farm on the Ryan Road, a townland of Ryan, near Mayobridge. Their Céilidh house on the Ryan Road, in the foothills of the Mourne Mountains was a focal point for Catholic and Protestant neighbours from nearby farms to enjoy music and craic.

The Sands Family started public performing in local halls and pubs, then they won a 'Folk Group' contest in "Old Shieling Hotel" in Raheny, Dublin. This led to booking in New York in early 1971 followed by further tours in the US and Canada. They also performed a Saint Patrick's Day concert appearance in Carnegie Hall. Their almost 4-decade touring career includes regular tours throughout continental Europe, especially Germany, as well as the UK and Ireland. One notable highlight was performing in Moscow's Luzhniki 'Olympic' Stadium. Since the early 2000s however, the Sands Family have restricted touring to an annual tour of Germany and Ireland.

== Discography ==
=== Albums ===
- Hope is in The Morning – Recorded "live" in Ravensburg and Obing, Germany in January 2000.
- Folk from the Mournes (1968) Outlet OAS 3004 (Ireland)
- First day and the second day, Autogram FLLP 501 (Germany)
- The third Day, Autogram ALLP\233 (Germany)
- As I roved out. Arfolk SB343 (France)
- Winds of Freedom. Pläne S16F600 (Germany)
- Now and Then. SLP1O8 (Ireland)
- Winds Are Singing Freedom & Love (1993) (or 1998?)
- Sands Family at Home. Autogram ALLP 294
- Tell me what you see. Pläne 88303 (Germany)
- Real Irish Folk. Emerald GES 1201 (Decca Ireland)
- You'll be well looked after (1975). Leaf 7005 EMI (Ireland)
- Folk from the Mournes (1997)
- Collection by The Sands Family (1998)
- After the Morning (1976). Leaf 7012 EMI (Ireland)
- Sands Family "Live". Pläne S16F601 (Germany)
- High Hills and Valleys, Pläne 88206 (Germany)
- Sands Family Collection. Spring Records (Ireland)
- Keep on Singing
- Home for Christmas SCD 1063 Spring Records (Ireland) 2013
