= Charlie Zahm =

American singer

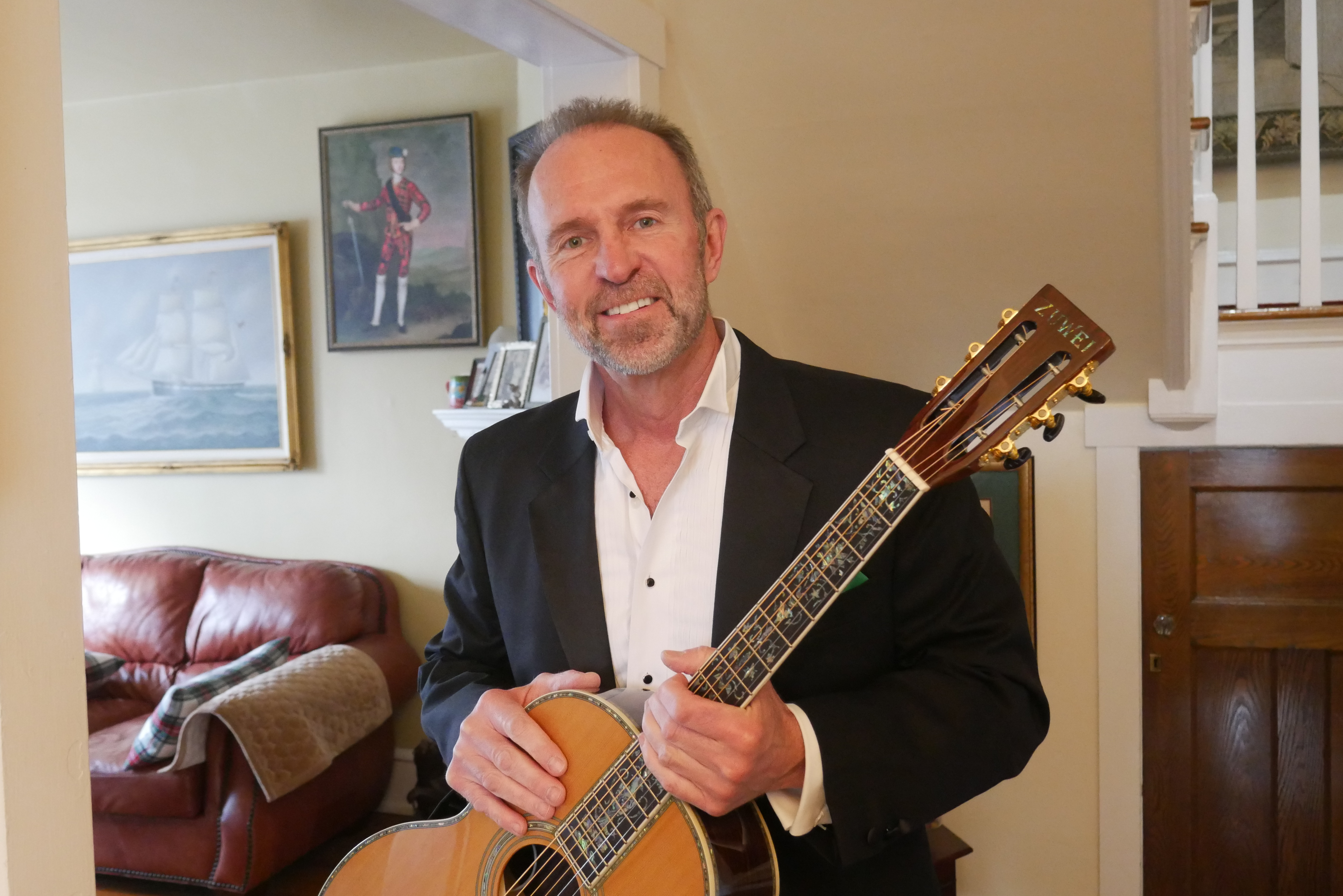
Charlie Zahm with his guitar

Charlie Zahm is an American singer and player of Celtic, maritime and traditional American music. Zahm sings baritone, and plays guitar, tin whistle, and the bodhran, among other instruments.

== Personal life ==
Zahm was born in 1965 in Michigan. He now resides in Pennsylvania.

== Music ==
Beginning as a John Denver devotee, Charlie Zahm now primarily performs Scottish, Irish, and early American traditional music. He has also branched out into other genres, recording a CD of hymns in 2009 and a country album in 2013. Zahm plays guitar, five-string banjo, mandolin, flute and pennywhistle. Zahm has recorded several albums composed entirely of self-written songs, mostly in a traditional Celtic style. Many of Zahm's studio albums and concerts feature former Del McCoury Band fiddler Tad Marks.

Zahm learned to play the banjo, his first instrument, at the age of 14. After attending college, he toured in Europe and Japan with Up With People. Zahm has continued to play shows across the world ever since, from large concert halls to the bonnie hills of Scotland. In 2014 he traveled to Qatar to play on Memorial Day for the members of the US Military at the Al Udeid Air Base.

== Albums ==
- Life of the Rover (2023)
- Sing Me a Song of a Lad that Is Gone (2018)
- Angels We Have Heard on High (2016)
- Far Away and Across the Sea(2015)
- Nothin' Like the South (2013)
- Songs of Highlands, Islands and Home! (2011)
- Precious Memories and Other Special Songs of Faith (2009)
- Best of the Early Years (2009)
- Recent Journeys (2008)
- The Immortal Memory - A Tribute to Scottish Poet Robert Burns (2008)
- Lighthouse on the Shore: An Evening of Classic Melodies with Charlie Zahm (2007)
- Among the Heather! (2005)
- The American Scrapbook (2003)
- Scotland's Heroes (2003)
- Songs for When the Sun Goes Down (2003)
- Out of the Mist (2002)
- Americana (2002)
- The White Snows of Winter (2001)
- A Walk in the Irish Rain (2001)
- The Celtic Balladeer (1999)
- Festival Favorites II The Glory of the Isles (1998)
- Under the Great Northern Stars (1997)
- Stormy Winds Do Blow The Maritime Collection (1997)
- Festival Favorites (1997)
- A Summer's Morning Rare (1995)
- Charlie Zahm Live The Celtic Concert (1995)
- A Song in the Aire (1994)
- Ye'll Tak the High Road (1994)
- Songs of Ireland, Scotland and the Sea (1992)

== DVDs ==
Charlie Zahm has also been featured in two DVDs: Out of the Mist in 2002 and Charlie Zahm: An Evening of Classic Melodies in 2007. He was also in the movie Gettysburg — Three Days of Destiny.
