= Maggie MacInnes =

- Born: 29 August 1963 (age 63)
- Origin: Glasgow, Scotland
- Genres: Celtic, Folk
- Occupation: Singer
- Instrument: Celtic harp
- Years active: 1984–present
- Label: Marram Music
- Website: https://www.maggiemacinnes.co.uk/

Maggie MacInnes (born 29 August 1963 in Glasgow, Scotland) is a Scottish folk singer and Celtic harpist, who performs primarily in Scottish Gaelic. She is the daughter of two Barra-natives; lawyer Alister MacInnes and legendary Gaelic folk singer Flora MacNeil.

== Discography ==
=== Solo albums ===
- Cairistìona (1984) – with George Jackson of Ossian
- Eilean Mara (Island in the Sea) (1998)
- Spiorad Beatha (The Spirit of Life) (2001)
- Peaceful Ground (Talamh Sìtheil) (2004)
- Òran Na Mnà (A Woman's Song) (2006)
- Leaving Mingulay (A Fàgail Mhiughalaigh) (2009)
- The Seedboat (Bàta an t-Sìl) (2010) – with Colum Sands
- Port Bàn (2020)

=== Collaborations and guest appearances ===
- Hamish Moore & Dick Lee – The Bees Knees (1991)
- Flora MacNeil – Orain Floraidh (1993)
- Donald Black – Keil Road (2007)
