= Kilkelly =

Village in County Mayo, Ireland

Kilkelly Irish: Cill Cheallaigh
- Village
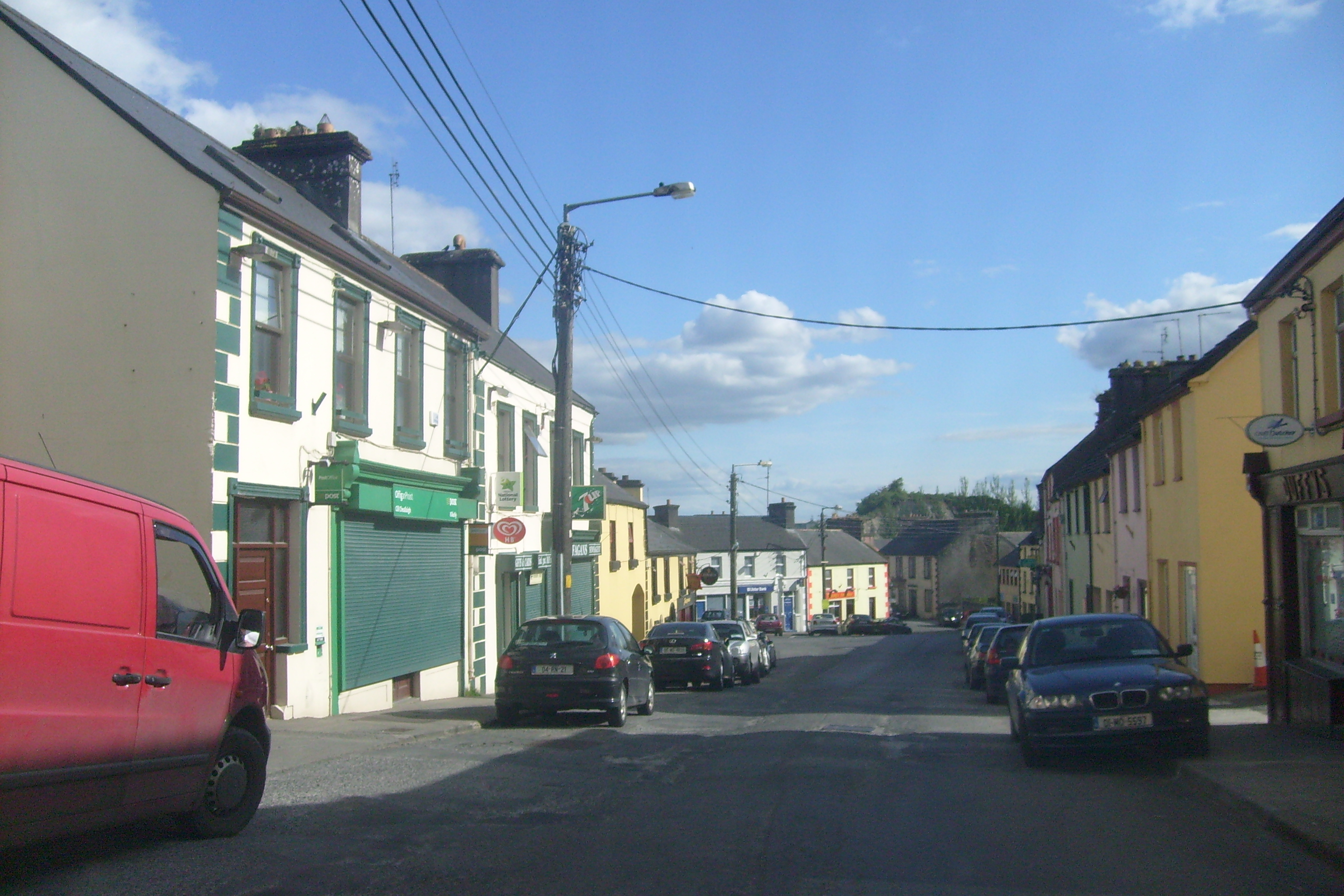
- Street and post office in Kilkelly

- Location in Ireland
- Coordinates: 53°52′16″N 8°51′01″W
- Country: Ireland
- Province: Connacht
- County: County Mayo
- Elevation: 77 m (253 ft)

Population (2016)
  - Total: 373
- Time zone: UTC+0 (WET)
  - Summer (DST): UTC-1 (IST (WEST))
- Irish Grid Reference: M441916

Kilkelly (Irish: Cill Cheallaigh, meaning 'church of Cellach') is a small village in Kilmovee civil parish, County Mayo, Ireland. It is just south of Ireland West Airport on the N17, a national primary road running between Galway and Sligo.

== History ==
=== Built heritage ===
Evidence of ancient settlement in the area includes a ringfort site in Liscosker townland. An early ecclesiastical site to the south of Kilkelly village, which includes the remains of a church and graveyard, is historically associated with Saint Celsus (or Cellach). The modern Roman Catholic church of Saint Celsus, to the north of the village, is in the Roman Catholic Diocese of Achonry. Urlaur Abbey, a monastic site dating to the mid-15th century, is also nearby.

=== Emigration ===
Kilkelly is the subject of a song. "Kilkelly, Ireland", by the American songwriter Peter Jones. In the 1980s, Jones discovered a collection of 19th century letters sent to his Irish emigrant ancestor in America from that ancestor's father in Kilkelly. Jones wrote a ballad based on the contents of those letters, conveying the experience of his own family as well as others separated by emigration.

== Amenities ==
Kilkelly has a number of shops, a pharmacy, credit union branch, and a post office. As of 2010, the local national (primary) school had over 50 pupils enrolled.

== Notable people ==
- George Harrison, IRA member and arms trafficker was born in nearby Shammer.
- Dominick Cafferky who was a local farmer and politician for the Clann na Talmhan political party.

== See also ==
- List of towns and villages in Ireland
