= Fiddler's Green =

Legendary afterlife in English maritime folk

Fiddler's Green is a heaven or afterlife described in 19th-century English maritime folklore, reserved for sailors who had served at least fifty years at sea. It consists of an idyll where there is perpetual mirth, a fiddle that never stops playing, and dancers who never tire.

== Mythology ==
Not all early mentions of Fiddler's Green are positive. For example, Edward Rose's The Sea-Devil, or, Son of a Bellows-Mender (1811) has the following dialogue:

"a seaman never goes to hell—Fiddler's green is the tar's mooring-ground." "And where is Fiddler's green?" [...] "'tis the half-way house. A rare place sure enough, where Old Nick is employed to mix hot grog for sailors."

and a description published in a number of magazines around 1825:

We are informed that there is in the other world, a place prepared for maids and bachelors called Fiddler's Green, where they are condemned, for the lack of good fellowship in this world, to dance together to all eternity.

More positively, Fiddler's Green is mentioned in Frederick Marryat's novel Snarleyyow; or, The Dog Fiend (1837), in a sailors' song with the chorus:

At Fidler's Green, where seamen true,
When here they've done their duty,
The bowl of grog shall still renew,
And pledge to love and beauty.

George John Whyte-Melville gives an account of Fiddler's Green in Cerise (1866) envisioning it as a land flowing with rum and lime juice accompanied by 'perpetual music, mirth, dancing, drinking, and tobacco'.

Herman Melville describes a Fiddler's Green as a sailors' term for the place on land "providentially set apart for dance-houses, doxies, and tapsters" in his posthumous novella Billy Budd, Sailor.

== In literature ==
In Patrick O'Brian's novel Post Captain (1972), the character Jack Aubrey describes several seamen living together on land by saying, "We'll lay in beer and skittles – it will be Fiddler's Green!".

In Neil Gaiman's The Sandman comic book series, Fiddler's Green is a place located inside of the Dreaming, a place that sailors have dreamed of for centuries. Fiddler's Green is also personified as a character as well as a location in the fictional world, the former largely based upon casual associations of G. K. Chesterton. In the 2022 TV adaption of the books, the personification is played by Stephen Fry. From November 12 to 14, 2004, a comic book convention promoted as "Fiddler's Green, A Sandman Convention" was held at the Millennium Hotel in Minneapolis, Minnesota. Author Neil Gaiman and several Sandman series artists, and others involved in the series' publication, participated in the convention, with profits benefiting the Comic Book Legal Defense Fund.

Fiddler's Green is an extrasolar colony mentioned in Robert A. Heinlein's novels Friday (1982) and The Cat Who Walks Through Walls (1985).

=== Title names ===
Fiddler's Green is the title of a 1950 novel by Ernest K. Gann, about a fugitive criminal who works as a seaman after stowing away. The author Richard McKenna wrote a story, first published in 1967, titled "Fiddler's Green,” in which he considers the power of the mind to create a reality of its own choosing, especially when a number of people consent to it. The main characters in this story are also sailors, and have known of the legend of Fiddler's Green for many years. It is also the title of the last book of Richard Woodman's history of the British Merchant Navy.

== In music ==
- A song called "Fiddler's Green", or more often "Fo'c'sle Song", was written by John Conolly in 1966, a Lincolnshire songwriter. It has been recorded by Tim Hart and Maddy Prior for their album Folk Songs of Olde England Vol. 2 (1968), by Harry Hibbs for his album The All-New Harry Hibbs with Shrimp Cocktail (1972), by The Dubliners for their album Plain and Simple (1973), by The Yetties for their album All at Sea (1973), and by The Irish Rovers for their album Upon a Shamrock Shore: Songs of Ireland & the Irish (2000). The American sailor band Schooner Fare credits the song for bringing together their band. The song is sung worldwide in nautical and traditional folk circles, and is often mistakenly thought to be a traditional song.
- "Fiddler's Green" is a song from the album Road Apples by Canadian rock group The Tragically Hip, written for lead singer Gord Downie's young nephew Charles Gillespie, who died before the album was released. The track was covered by Welsh band Stereophonics on their 1999 Deluxe album Performance and Cocktails.
- "Fiddler's Green" is a song from Marley's Ghost's album Four Spacious Guys (1996).
- Fiddler's Green is the title track and name of Tim O'Brien's Grammy Award-winning 2005 album.
- Fiddler's Green is a German folk-rock band, formed in 1990.
- "Fiddler on the Green" is a song by German-American power metal supergroup Demons & Wizards, from their self-titled album released in 1999.
- Fiddler's Green is mentioned in the Archie Fisher song "The Final Trawl" from the album Windward Away, about fishermen whose livelihoods are passing away.
- Fiddler's Green is also mentioned in the extended version of the song "Hoist the Colors" from the Pirates of the Caribbean films.
- Friends of Fiddler's Green is a folk music group from Canada, founded in 1971.
- Fiddler's Green is an outdoor amphitheatre in Greenwood Village, Colorado.
- "Fiddler's Green" was recorded by the American quintet Bounding Main and released on their 2005 album Maiden Voyage.
- Fiddler's Green International Festival is an annual folk music festival in the village of Rostrevor, Northern Ireland.

== In art ==
- Statue by Ray Lonsdale, installed in 2017 on Fish Quay in North Shields, England.
- In the fifth installment of the Monkey Island game series (Tales of Monkey Island by Telltale Games, namely Chapter 5 - The Rise of the Pirate God) Guybrush Threepwood visits the pirate crossroads, which is quoted by character Galeb as being "The stopping point before Fiddler's Green."

== In film ==
- In George A. Romero's Land of the Dead, the human holdout, surrounded by water, is a former luxury development called Fiddler's Green.
- In The Sandman (TV series) Fiddler's Green is a forest who leaves the Dreaming in the form of an elderly man to experience life as a human.

== In the United States military ==
The Cavalrymen's Poem, also entitled "Fiddlers' Green" was published in the US Army's Cavalry Journal in 1923 and became associated with the 1st Cavalry Division.

Halfway down the trail to Hell,
In a shady meadow green
Are the Souls of all dead Troopers camped,
Near a good old-time canteen.
And this eternal resting place
Is known as Fiddlers' Green.

Marching past, straight through to Hell
The Infantry are seen.
Accompanied by the Engineers,
Artillery and Marines,
For none but the shades of Cavalrymen
Dismount at Fiddlers' Green.

Though some go curving down the trail
To seek a warmer scene,
No trooper ever gets to Hell
Ere he's emptied his canteen.
And so rides back to drink again
With friends at Fiddlers' Green.

And so when man and horse go down
Beneath a saber keen,
Or in a roaring charge of fierce melee
You stop a bullet clean,
And the hostiles come to get your scalp,
Just empty your canteen,
And put your pistol to your head
and go to Fiddlers' Green.

The name has had other military uses. Many places associated with the US military have been named Fiddler's Green:

- The US Marine Corps operated Firebase Fiddler's Green in the Helmand River Valley, in Helmand Province, Afghanistan.
- An artillery Fire Support Base in Military Region III in Vietnam in 1972, occupied principally by elements of 2nd Squadron, 11th Armored Cavalry
- The US Navy's enlisted men's club in Sasebo, Japan from 1952 to 1976
- The cavalryman's poem about Fiddler's Green is the regimental poem of the US 2nd Cavalry Regiment.
- The enlisted men's club at United States Naval Training Center Bainbridge
- An informal bar at the Fort Sill Officers' Open Mess
- The home of Parsons Mounted Cavalry, a special unit within the Corps of Cadets at Texas A&M University in College Station, Texas
- A bar at the Saber & Quill in Fort Knox, Kentucky
- The larger of the two bars at the Leader's Club at Fort Benning, Georgia
- Building 2805 at Fort Hood, Texas, the former officer's club
- A small enlisted club on the Marine Corps Base Camp Pendleton in California
- The base pub at the Joint Forces Training Base in Los Alamitos, California
- Former dining facility used by 2nd Cavalry Regiment at Fort Polk, Louisiana
- An artillery-only pub for the 10th Marine Regiment, Marine Corps Base Camp Lejeune in North Carolina
- A privately owned restaurant in San Diego, California adjacent to Naval Base Point Loma and Marine Corps Recruit Depot San Diego

== See also ==
- Cockaigne
- Blessed Island
- Friends of Fiddler's Green
