= Tommy Sands (Irish singer) =

Irish singer (born 1945)

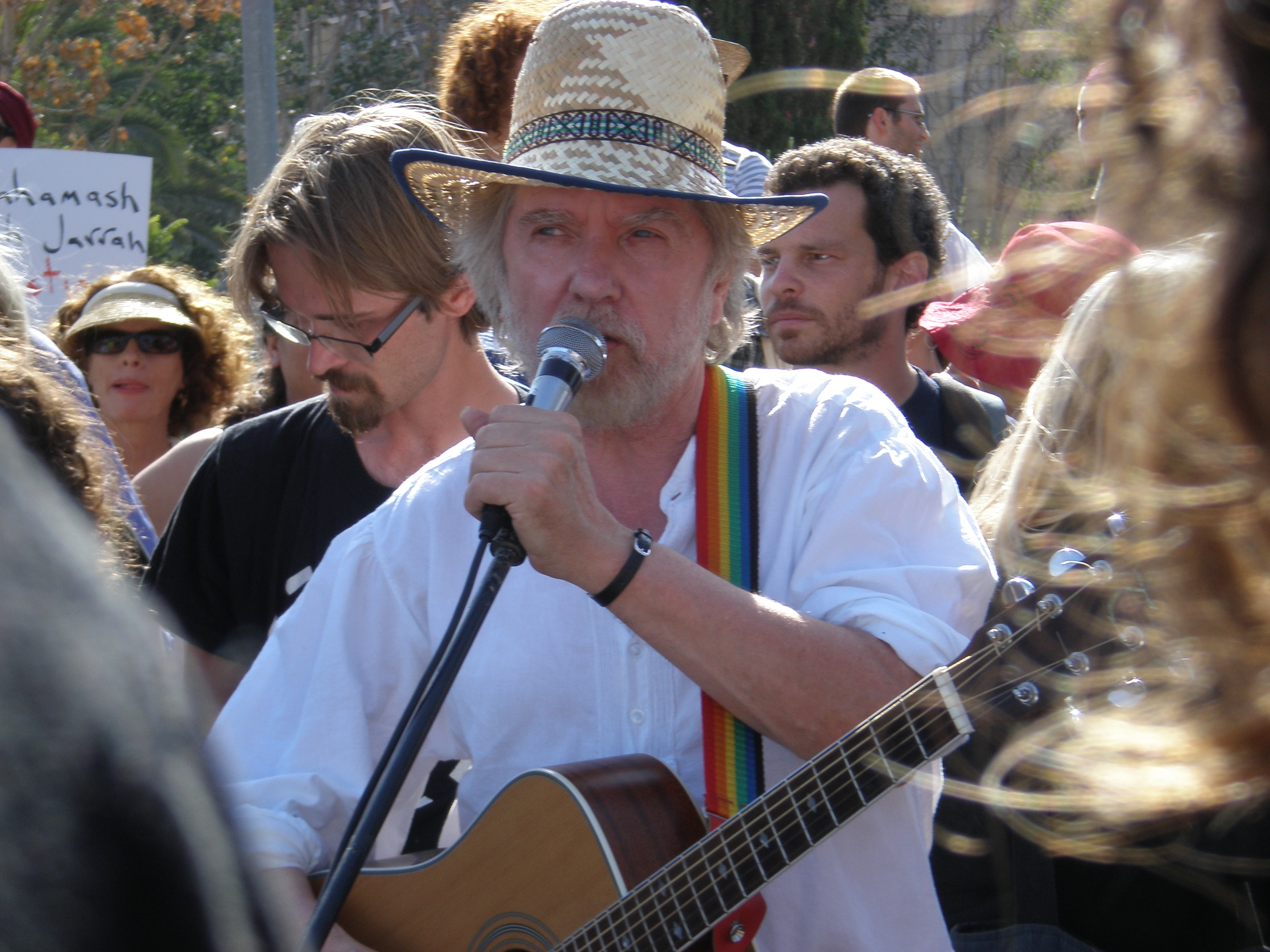
- Tommy Sands performs in a joint Israeli-Palestinian demonstration in Sheikh Jarrah against house evictions of Palestinians by Israeli courts.

Background information
- Born: 19 December 1945 (age 80)
- Origin: Mayobridge, County Down, Northern Ireland
- Genres: Irish Folk, Celtic
- Occupations: Singer-songwriter, radio broadcaster, political activist
- Instruments: Guitar, Whistle, Banjo, Fiddle, Bodhrán, vocals
- Years active: 1960s-present
- Website: www.sandfamilyfolk.com tommysands.com

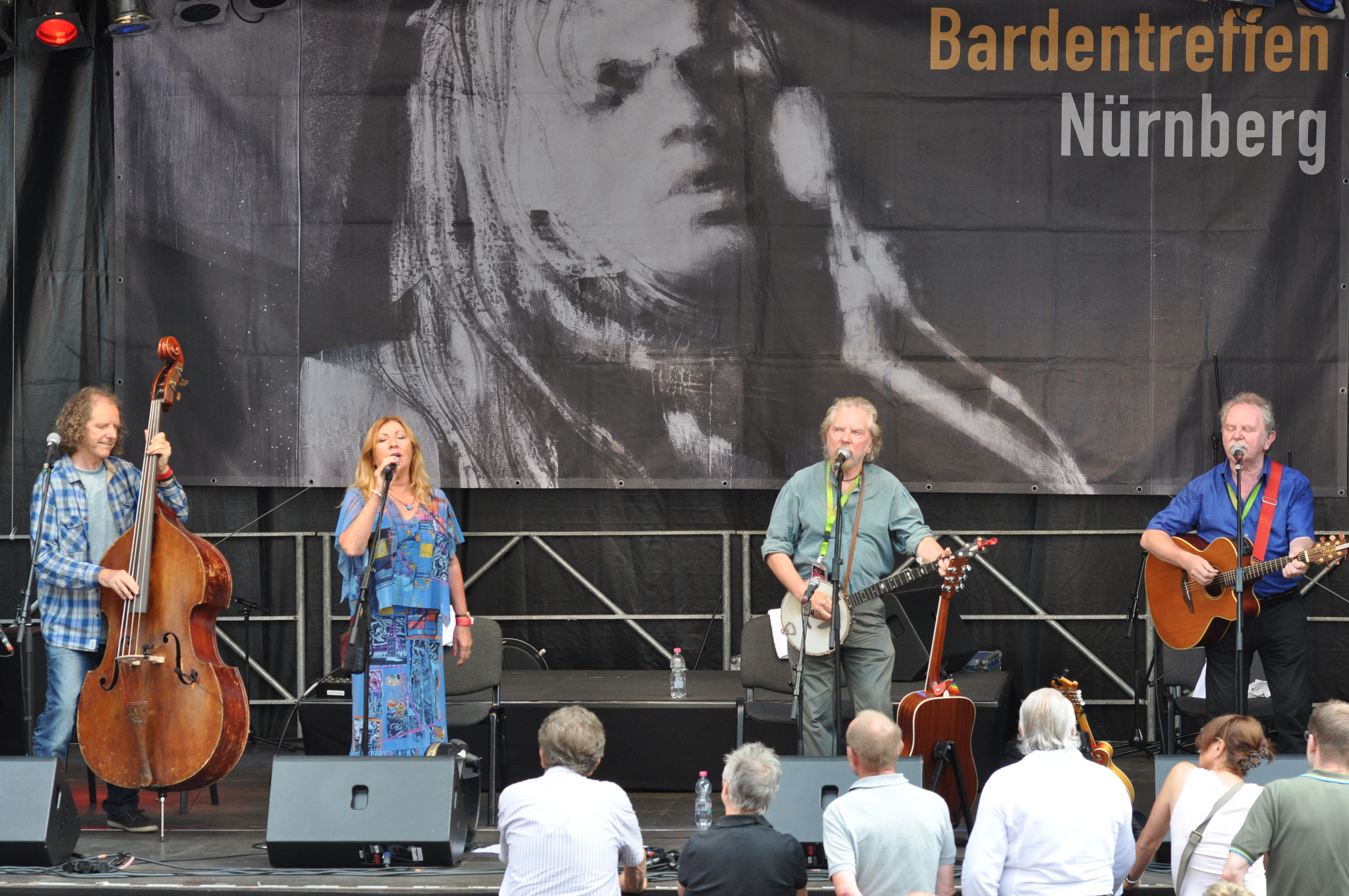
Tommy Sands with The Sands Family at the Bardentreffen festival 2014

Tommy Sands (born 19 December 1945) is a Northern Irish folk singer, songwriter, radio broadcaster, and political activist. He performs with his three siblings as the Sands Family; solo as Tommy Sands; and with his son and daughter as Tommy Sands with Moya and Fionán Sands. Tommy was the prime songwriter for the Sands Family, one of Ireland's most influential folk groups of the 1960s and 1970s.

Tommy Sands hosted Country Céilí, a radio show on Downtown Radio in Newtownards for 37 years from 1976.

His song "There Were Roses" has been described as "certainly one of the best songs ever written about the "Irish Problem"".

In May 2002 he received an honorary doctorate from the University of Nevada, Reno, for his outstanding work as musician and ambassador for peace and understanding. May 18 of each year has been proclaimed Tommy Sands Day in Reno.

In November 2026 he received the RTÉ Radio 1 Folk Awards Lifetime Achievement Award in recognition of his career. The award was presented on the night by Bernadette Devlin McAliskey.

== Early life ==
Tommy Sands was born on the family farm on the 'Ryan Road' in the townland of Ryan, near Mayobridge, County Down, Northern Ireland. His parents, Mick and Bridie, both came from families of singers, musicians and storytellers and encouraged a love of Irish culture and tradition in their seven children (Mary, the eldest, then Hugh, Ben, Colum, Eugene and Anne). His father Mick (known to all as 'The Chief') and six uncles played the fiddle. His mother Bridie, an accordionist, is the daughter of 'Burren poet', Owen Connolly, and her mother was related to the Brontë family. Their Céilidh house on the Ryan Road, in the foothills of the Mourne Mountains, was a focal point for Catholic and Protestant neighbours from nearby farms to enjoy music and craic.

Sands initially attended college to study theology and philosophy, but dropped out and began to walk the 120 miles home to concentrate on his music career. Along the way a car filled with his siblings picked him up to perform at a concert. His brother Colum rolled down the window and said, 'We're going to play at a concert. We've got your guitar in the back of the car.' Tommy joined them and has been performing ever since.

== The Sands Family ==
The Sands Family band (Tommy, Eugene, Ben, Colum and Anne) started public performing in local halls and pubs, then they won a 'Folk Group' contest in Old Shieling Hotel in Raheny, Dublin. This led to a three-week booking in New York circa 1970.) followed by further tours in the US and Canada. They also performed a Saint Patrick's Day concert appearance in Carnegie Hall.

Their career has included regular tours throughout continental Europe, especially Germany, as well as the UK and Ireland. One notable highlight was performing in Moscow's Luzhniki Olympic Stadium. Tommy was the prime songwriter with the Sands Family, whose repertoire largely consists of their own compositions as well as traditional Irish songs.

During the 1975 Sands Family tour of Germany, Tommy's brother Eugene was killed in a road accident. Dino played banjo and mandolin.

Since the early 2000s the Sands Family have restricted touring to an annual tour of Germany and Ireland.

== Solo career ==
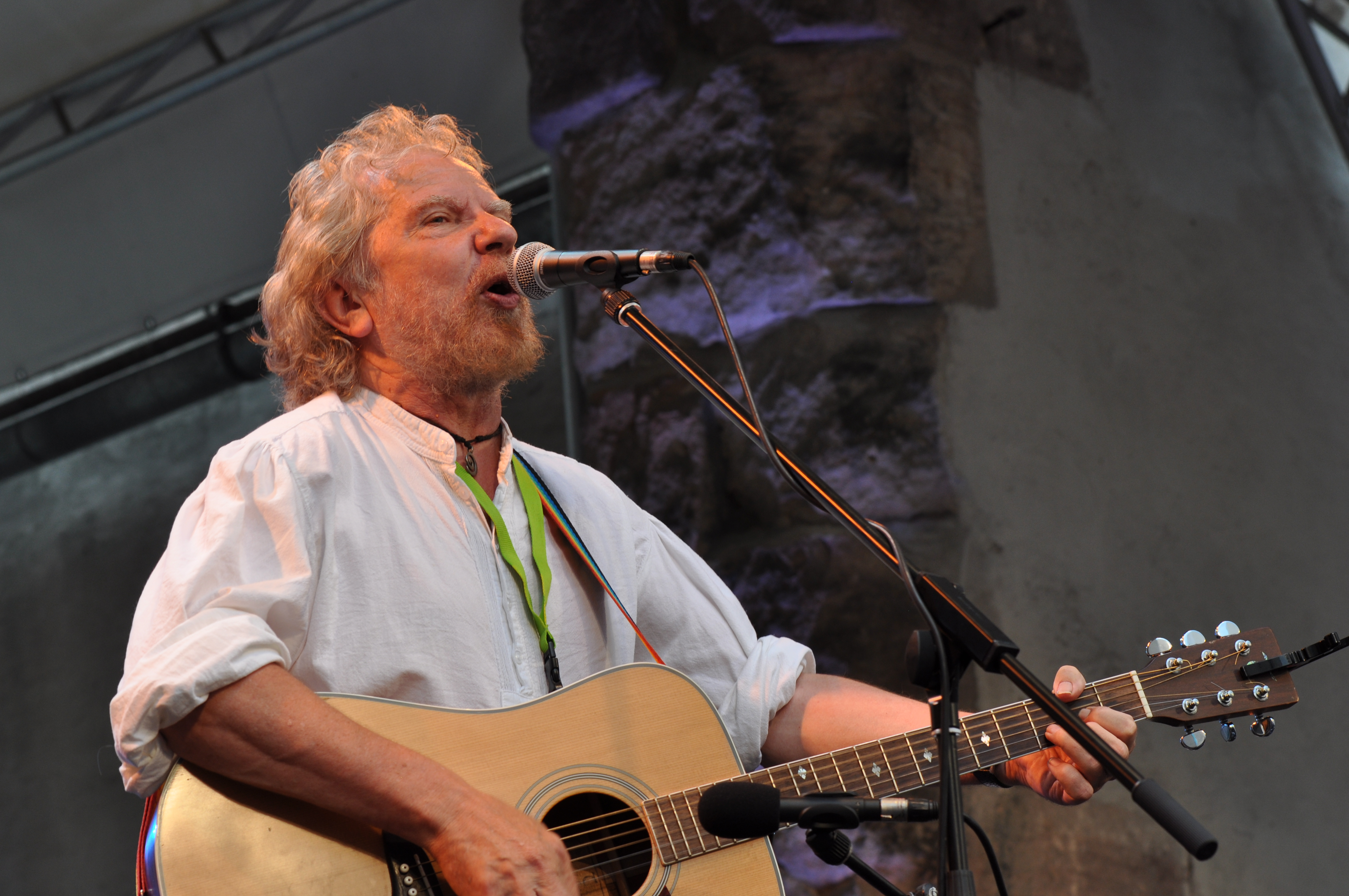
Tommy Sands at the Nuremberg Bardentreffen world music festival 2014

Sands' best known song is "There Were Roses" that recounts how Allan Bell (name changed from that of an actual individual), a Protestant friend of Sands, was murdered in Newry by republican paramilitaries. In the aftermath, loyalist paramilitaries "prowled round the Ryan Road" for a Catholic to kill in retaliation; ironically, the man they selected, Sean O'Malley (name changed), had been a good friend of the Protestant victim and also of Sands. It was first recorded by Robbie O'Connell with Mick Moloney and Jimmy Keane as the title track on their first album. Tommy Sands also recorded his own version as the opening track of his 1985 album Singing of the Times.

The song has also been recorded by Kathy Mattea, Dolores Keane, Sean Keane, Frank Patterson, Paddy Reilly, Dick Gaughan, The Dubliners, Cara Dillon, Lisa McHugh and many others. It has also been translated into many languages and is currently included in the English language syllabus in German secondary schools.

In 2004 Sands and "There Were Roses" received the award for 'Best Original Song' at the BBC Radio 2 Folk Awards.

In Belfast, during the depths of The Troubles in August 1986, Sands organised a "Citizen's Assembly" which included many of Ulster's top artists and literary figures.

In December 2002 Sands persuaded the Members of the Northern Ireland Assembly to record a special Christmas musical party for his weekly radio show. As many Members sang with him on stage David Ervine, the leader of the Loyalists remarked "Tommy Sands is the only man, without a private army, who can intimidate me." The radio show received a special award at the "World Festival of TV and Radio" in New York.

In September 2008 Sands was invited to perform at the Library of Congress with his daughter Moya and son Fionán, as part of the Rediscover Northern Ireland Program. The event was co-sponsored by the Arts Council of Northern Ireland and the American Folklife Center.

In June 2010 Sands accepted the invitation of Palestinian and Israeli activists conducting a joint campaign at the neighbourhood of Sheikh Jarrah in East Jerusalem, to come and perform at a rally held to protest Israeli settlers evicting Palestinian Sheikh Jarrah residents and taking over their homes.

In February 2024 in response to the violence occurring in Gaza, Sands wrote a plaintive ballad titled 'Anyone else up there' accompanied by a video about the plight of children. In the same month, New York rabbi Regina Sandler-Phillips wrote a blog about the same conflict in The Times of Israel titled 'Singing in a Strange Land of Trauma', quoting from Sands' song 'There Were Roses' alongside Psalm 137 and American abolitionist Frederick Douglass.

== Discography ==
=== Solo recordings ===
Album	Year	Description
Singing of the Times	1985	Album included both 'Daughters and Sons' and the iconic ballad 'There Were Roses' about the murders of two of his friends.
Down by Bendy's Lane: Irish Songs and Stories for Children	1988	Tommy's young children Fionán and Moya, were amongst the performers. Included 'Tell me a story'; 'Art'; 'Neart and Ceart'; 'Fair Rosa'; 'Bonnie wee house of Iveagh'; 'Banana song'; 'Story of Willie Brennan'; 'Down by Bendy's Lane'; 'Ceann Mor'; 'The old sow'; 'Moya is my darling'; 'Night night sleep tight and Einini'.
Hedges of County Down	1989	Featured traditional Irish material including 'The hedges of Co Down'; 'The maid of Ballydoo'; 'Lovely Irish maid'; 'Twa corbies'; 'Age of twenty one'; 'Reilly from Co Cavan'; 'Ballynure Ballad'; 'Star of the Co Down'; 'Si do mhaigh mo i'; 'Boys of Mullaghbawn'; 'The Granemore hare'; 'Dunn'; 'Paddy's green shamrock shore'.
Beyond the Shadows	1990	Featured his own material including 'The County Down'; 'Shadow of O'Casey'; 'Dresden'; 'We will rise again'; 'Flower of Fiddlers Green'; 'When the boys come rolling home'; '1999'; 'The clown'; 'No sleep tonight'; 'Red wine'; 'Home away from home'; 'Make me want to stay'.
The Heart's a Wonder	1995	Included 'The music of healing' (with Pete Seeger); 'Who knows where the wind blows'; 'Sudako' (and the paper cranes); 'The age of uncertainty'; 'Irish Molly-o' (the sash); 'Back to school again'; 'Short cut through the fields' (with Dolores Keane); 'The day we won the All Ireland'; 'I hate to hear people cry'; 'A little bit more'; 'Sailing through the sky'; 'Goodbye love'; 'There's no one leaving'. The Music of Healing, which was co-written with American folk singer Pete Seeger became an anthem for the Northern Ireland "Citizen's Assembly". It was also the first collaboration with cellist Vedran Smailovic from Sarajevo.
Where Have All the Flowers Gone: The Songs of Pete Seeger.	1997	Included both Vedran Smailović and Dolores Keane on the title track.
Sarajevo / Belfast	1999	With Vedran Smailović; featuring Seeger and Baez.
To Shorten the Winter	2006	Includes Christmas songs 'Like the first time it's Christmas time', 'Down by the Laganside', 'The Bushes of Jerusalem', 'Whiter Shade of Pale', 'Hearts of Love', 'A Christmas Childhood/ a call to hope', 'Welcome here kind stranger', 'Raglan Road', 'Slainte mhaith'/the cat in the attic, 'Let me be your island', 'The mixed marriage', 'Matt Hyland', 'Slan Abhaile'.
Let the Circle Be Wide	2009	Including 'Young Man's Dream' (Danny Boy), 'The Song Sings On' (Ballad of Tommy Makem), 'The People Have Spoken', 'You Will Never Grow Old', 'Send for Maguire', 'Keep on Singing', 'A Stor Mo Chroi', 'Rovers of Wonder', 'Make Those Dreams Come True', 'Ballyvalley Brae', 'Time for Asking Why', 'Fields of Daisies', 'Rambling Wild and Free', 'Carlingford Bay', 'Let the Circle be Wide',
Arising from the Troubles	2011	Including 'Song of Erin', 'A Stone's Throw', 'The Mixed Marriage', 'We'll Sing It All Over', 'Bloody Sunday', 'Have You Seen Joe Cahill', 'The Road to Aughnacloy', 'A Call to Hope', 'You Sold Us Down the River', 'Troubles', 'Bessbrook Lament', 'All the Little Children', 'Sailing Through the Sky', 'A Quiet Man', 'The Music of Healing', 'Carry On', 'Silent No Longer', 'Down by the Lagan Side'

== Other work ==
Sands co-wrote the stage musical, The Shadow of O'Casey with Shivaun O'Casey, the daughter of playwright Seán O'Casey.

Tommy Sands has hosted Country Ceili, a radio show on Downtown Radio in Belfast since 1976 (or August 1977).

In 2005 he published his autobiography, The Songman – A Journey in Irish Music.

== Personal life ==
Tommy Sands currently lives with his wife in Rostrevor, County Down. They have two children with whom Tommy now performs.
