= Seamus Kennedy (singer) =

Irish-American Celtic musician, singer, composer, humorist, and writer (born 1949)

- Born: 1 October 1949 (age 77); Belfast, Northern Ireland
- Genres: Irish folk, contemporary, humor
- Occupations: Musician, humorist, writer
- Instruments: Guitar, vocals, banjo, bodhrán
- Years active: 1971 – present
- Label: Gransha Records
- Website: seamuskennedy.com

Seamus Kennedy (born 1949) is an Irish-American Celtic musician, singer, composer, humorist, and writer. Born in Belfast, he has entertained a broad variety of audiences from schoolchildren and Irish festivals to the President of the United States and Pope John Paul II.

== Life ==
Born in Belfast in 1949 to the Kennedy family from County Antrim, he started performing Irish music at age 14. He studied Gaeilge and Romance languages at University College Dublin before emigrating to the United States in 1971.

Kennedy is a baritone who performs in concert as well as at Irish and Scottish festivals. He also leads musical tours of the Emerald Isle. He was voted Best Irish/Celtic Male Vocalist 1993–2006 by the Washington Area Music Association.

== Discography ==
- Raise Your Weary Hearts (Rego Irish Records, 1984, rereleased Gransha Records)
- Irish And Scottish (Gransha Records, Circa early 90s)
- One Dozen Roses (Gransha Records, Circa early 90s)
- By Popular Demand Volume 1 (Gransha Records, 1993)
- By Popular Demand Volume 2 (Gransha Records, 1993)
- Live! (Gransha Records, 1993)
- In Concert (Gransha Records, 1995)
- Goodwill to Men (Gransha Records, 1996)
- Let the Music Take You Home (Gransha Records, 1998)
- Bar Rooms and Ballads (Gransha Records, 2000)
- Gets on Everybody's Nerves (Gransha Records, 2000)
- Favorite Selections (Gransha Records, 2000, a compilation of Raise Your Weary Hearts, Irish And Scottish, and One Dozen Roses, according to the liner notes)
- A Smile and a Tear (Gransha Records, 2001)
- On The Rocks (Gransha Records, 2004)
- By Popular Demand (Gransha Records, 2005, a compilation of volumes 1 and 2)
- Party Pieces (Gransha Records, 2005)
- Sailing Ships and Sailing Men (Gransha Records, 2008)
- Sidekicks and Sagebrush (Gransha Records, 2009)
- Tricky Tongue Twisters (Gransha Records, 2013)
- Ireland's 32 Volume 1: Songs of Ulster & Munster (Gransha Records, CD Baby, 2015)
- Ireland's 32 Volume 2: Songs of Leinster & Connacht (Gransha Records, CD Baby, 2016)

== Writings ==
- Clean Cabbage in the Bucket (And Other Tales From The Irish Music Trenches), co-written with Robbie O'Connell, Dennis O'Rourke, Harry O'Donoghue and Frank Emerson.
