= Colum Sands =

Irish singer songwriter (born 1951)

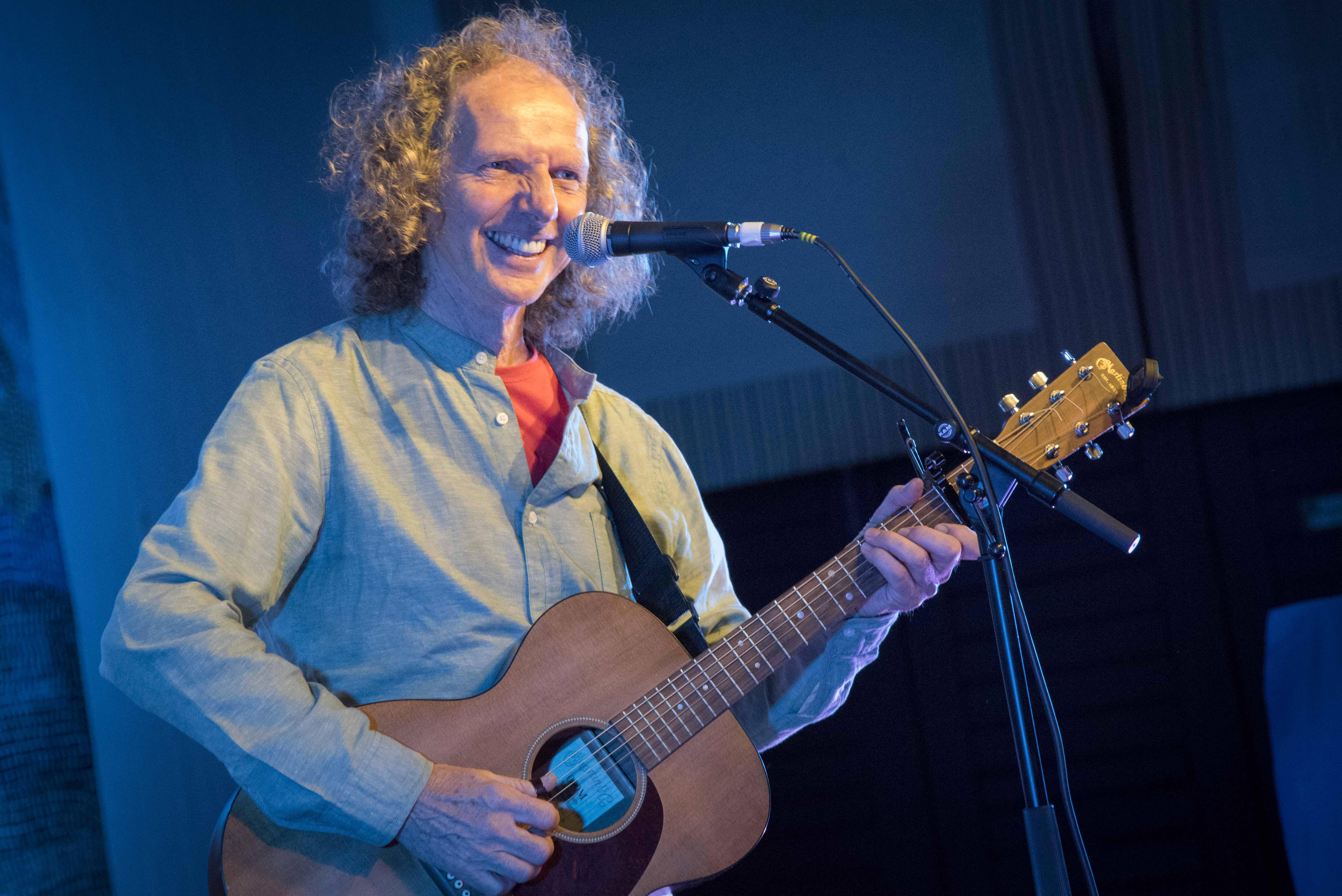

Background information
- Born: Colum Sands; 1951 (age 74–75)
- Origin: Mayobridge, County Down, Northern Ireland
- Genres: Irish Folk, Celtic
- Occupations: Singer-songwriter, radio broadcaster
- Years active: 1970s-present
- Member of: The Sands Family
- Website: www.sandsfamilyfolk.com www.columsands.com

Colum Sands (born 1951) is an Irish singer-songwriter who made his first performances and recordings with The Sands Family of County Down. Between his extensive solo appearances, he continues to record and perform with his brothers Tommy and Ben and his sister Anne in the family band.

Following appearances throughout Europe and North America in venues ranging from small folk clubs to Carnegie Hall New York City, in 1981, Sands set up the independent record label Spring Records, with a recording studio at his home in Rostrevor, County Down.

He has produced around one hundred albums, working with young traditional musicians, songwriters and bands, ranging from first-time recording artists like Cara Dillon and Oige, Deanta, Neil Mulligan and Kieran Goss to veteran performers including Joan Baez, The Sands Family, Liam O'Flynn, Vedran Smailovic and Pete Seeger.

Sands has released eight albums featuring his own songs and a songbook titled Between the Earth and the Sky illustrated by Colum McEvoy.

As well as performing his own songs, Sands has translated Goethe into English (recording a bilingual version of "Nähe des Geliebten" with Berlin singer Scarlett Seeboldt), worked and toured in the Middle East with Israeli storyteller Sharon Aviv on the English/Hebrew peace initiative production "Talking to the Wall" and translated Scottish Gaelic songs into English on his collaboration with Scottish singer and harper Maggie MacInnes.

His songs have been translated into German, Dutch, Danish and Hebrew and have been recorded by many artists including Maddy Prior, June Tabor, Liam Clancy, Tommy Makem, Roy Bailey, Andy Irvine and Mick Hanly.

Apart from songwriting and studio production, Sands has worked in a number of theatrical collaborations and his involvement as a musician with the Lyric Theatre (Belfast) in 1976 found him working with Liam Neeson in the Patrick Galvin play We Do it for Love. He has also composed music for Community Playwright Patch Connolly's plays, The Fair Day and The Square.

Sands is also well known as a radio presenter, from the 1990s until 2016 he presented Folk Club, the popular weekly programme on BBC Radio Ulster. He has also compiled and/or presented radio programmes for BBC Radio 2 (Shifting Sands) RTÉ Radio 1 (Rootin' About.) and BBC Radio 4 "The First LP in Ireland".

Sands received a Living Tradition Award for his services to Folk and Traditional Music and his song, "Donegall Road" was included in the Smithsonian Institution's album Sound Neighbours, which received three shortlisting nominations for the 2008 Grammy Awards.

== Discography ==
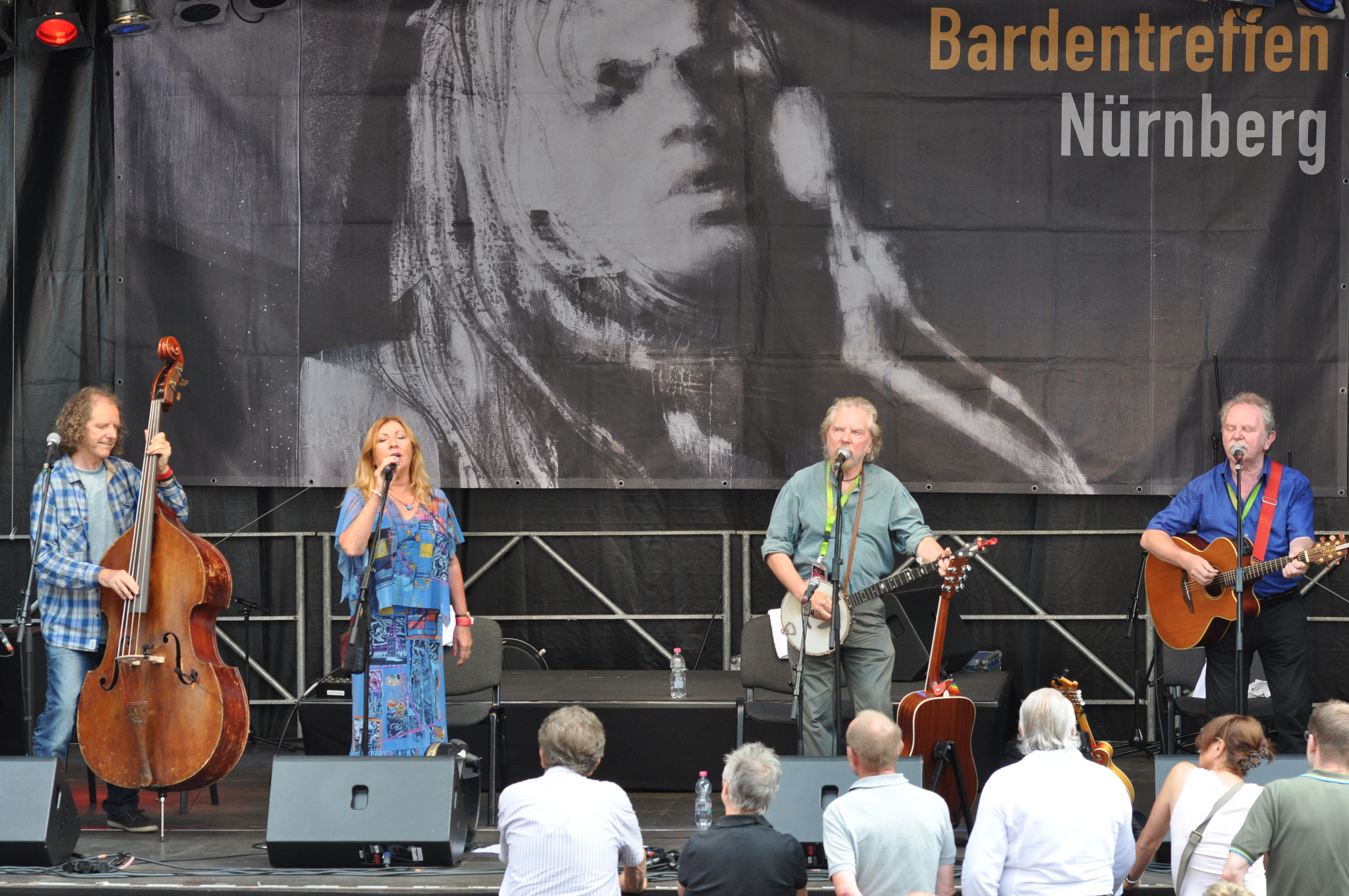
The Sands Family at the Bardentreffen festival 2014

=== Studio albums ===
- 1981: Unapproved Road, Spring Records SCD 1001
- 1989: The March Ditch, Spring Records SCD 1014
- 1996: All My Winding Journeys, Spring Records SCD 1035
- 2003: The Note That Lingers On, Spring Records SCD 1051
- 2009: Look Where I've Ended Up Now, Spring Records SCD 1059
- 2013: Turn the Corner, Spring Records SCD 1062
- 2020: Song Bridge, Spring Records SCD 1067

=== Live albums ===
- 2007: Live in Concert Songs and Stories, Spring Records SCD 1054

=== Collaborations ===
- 2002: Talking to the Wall – with Sharon Aviv, Spring Records SCD 1048
- 2011: The Seedboat (Bàta an t-Sìl) – with Maggie MacInnes, Spring Records SCD 1061

=== Other appearances ===
- 2007: Sound Neighbours: Contemporary Music in Northern Ireland, Smithsonian Folkways Recordings SFW40544
- 2009: Dear Irish Boy – Marianne Green with Andy Irvine, Glas Records MEGCD02

== Books ==
- 2000: Colum Sands Songbook Between the Earth and the Sky, Cottage Publications
