= Harry O'Donoghue =

Irish musician

Harry O'Donoghue is an Irish musician.

== Childhood ==
Harry was born in 1954 in the town of Drogheda on the banks of the river Boyne on the East coast of Ireland.

== Early career ==
At age twenty, Harry began playing guitar and bodhran and was soon performing with local folk groups. In 1979, Harry founded the group Terra Nova and later that summer they won a prestigious award for Best Folk group at the Dublin International Music Festival. Within a year, the group was touring in America and secured a recording contract with Polydor Records in 1985.

=== Solo ===
After Terra Nova performed their last concert in Augusta Georgia in 1987, Harry embarked on what was to become a very successful solo career. During the next few years he concentrated on songwriting and released several critically acclaimed albums throughout the nineties.

Harry has performed, by invitation, with the Savannah Symphony and has shared the bill with such international recording artists as Mary Black, Andy M. Stewart, Cathie Ryan, The Fureys, Natalie Mac Master, Danny Doyle, The Wolfe Tones, The Shannon Castle Singers, Tommy Makem, acclaimed Bodhrán player Butch Elmgren, and others.

He performs throughout the U.S and Ireland in a variety of settings from concerts to festivals, clubs, private events, conventions and singer/songwriter showcases. Harry also hosts singing workshops, passing along folksongs in the oral tradition and customizes and guides tour groups to Ireland each year.

Savannah, Georgia has been Harry's home for many years now and it's from there he co-produces and hosts the Green Island Radio Show, a popular weekly Georgia Public Broadcasting program highlighting Celtic music in its many forms; traditional, folk and contemporary.

== Discography ==
- Live and Well (1989)
- Diamonds (1995)
- O'Donoghue - Folksinger (1996)
- It'll Be Alright on the Night (1998)
- Best Foot Forward (1999)
- A Christmas Postcard (2000)
- How's It Goin'? (2002)
- Sincerely (2005)
- Live From the'Boro (2006)
- Nollaig (2007)
- A Splash of No Regrets (2010)
- Live and Just as Well (2010)
- Terra Nova (2014)
- Stillness in the Air (2014)
- Seasons of Love (2015)
