= Bardentreffen =

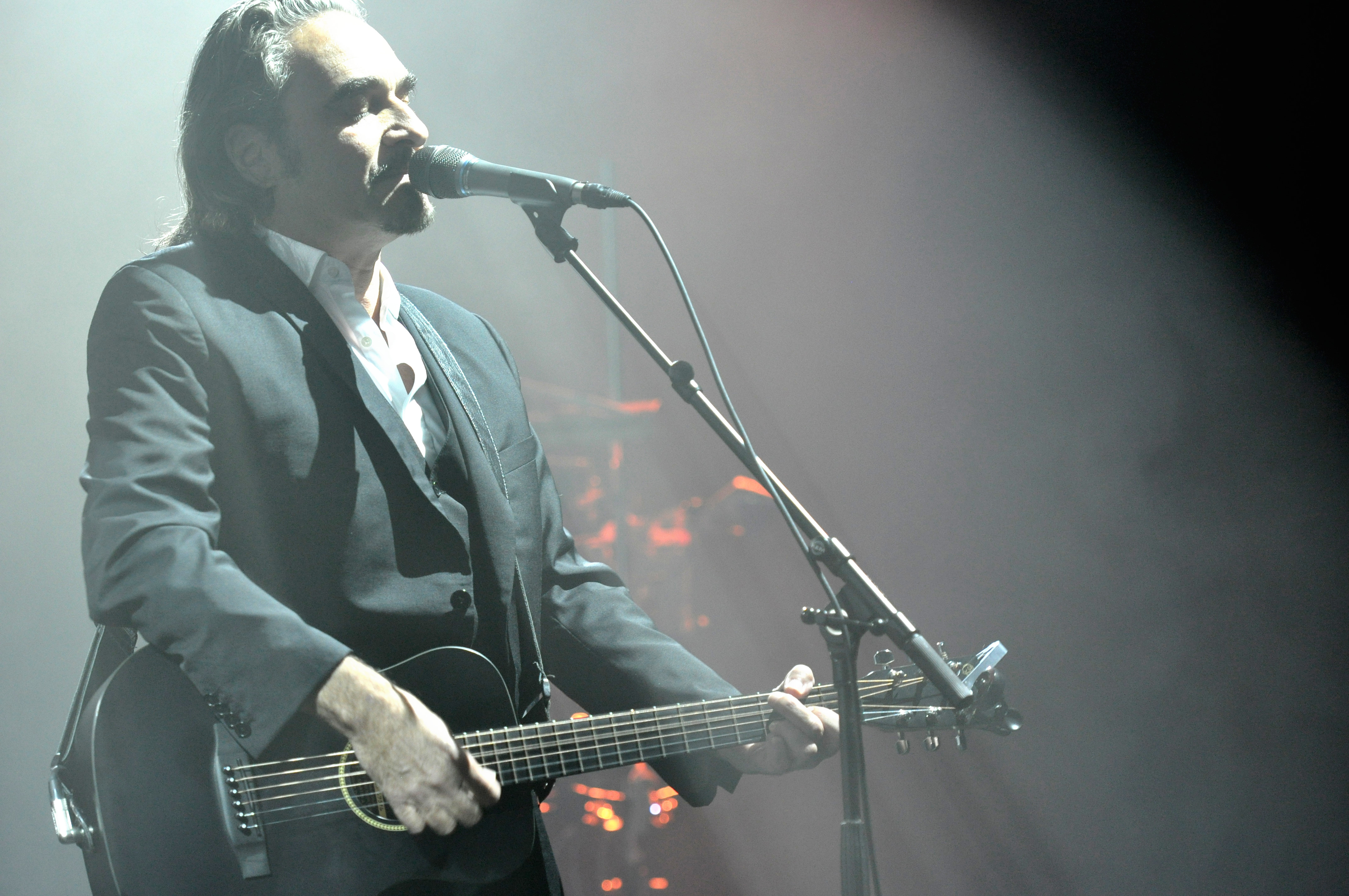
Stephan Eicher at Bardentreffen 2015

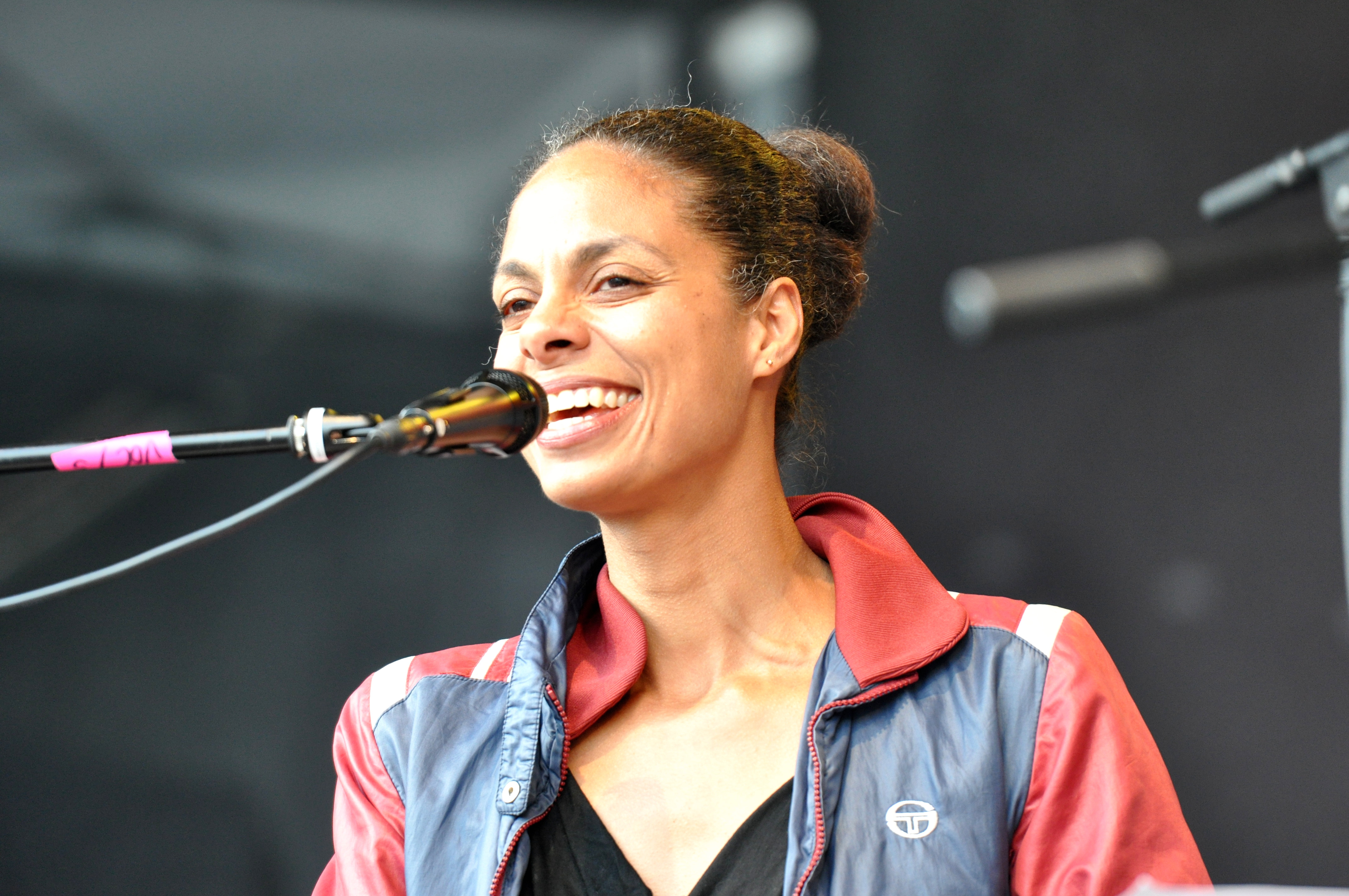
Astrid North at Bardentreffen 2015

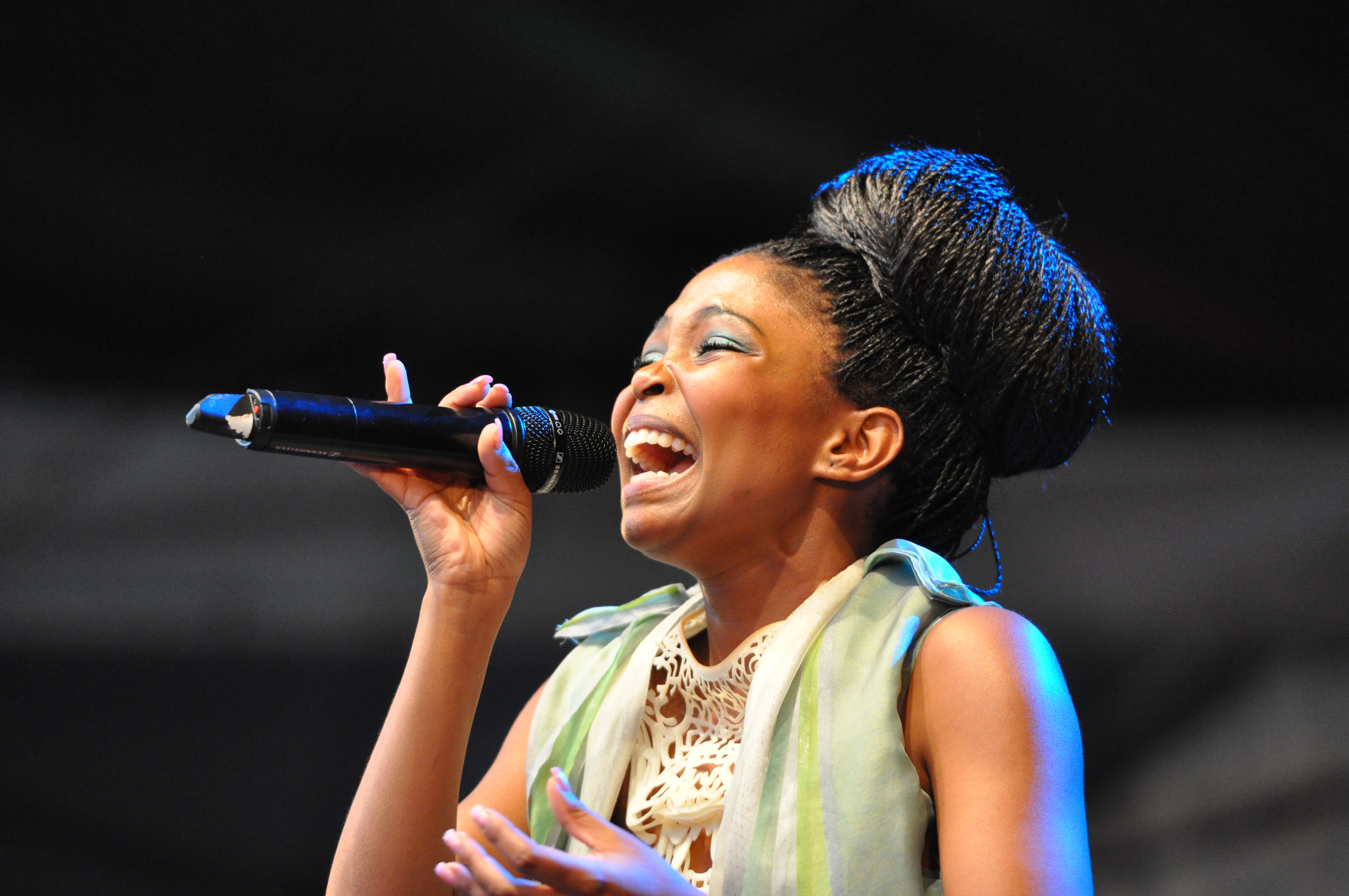
Nomfusi at Bardentreffen 2014

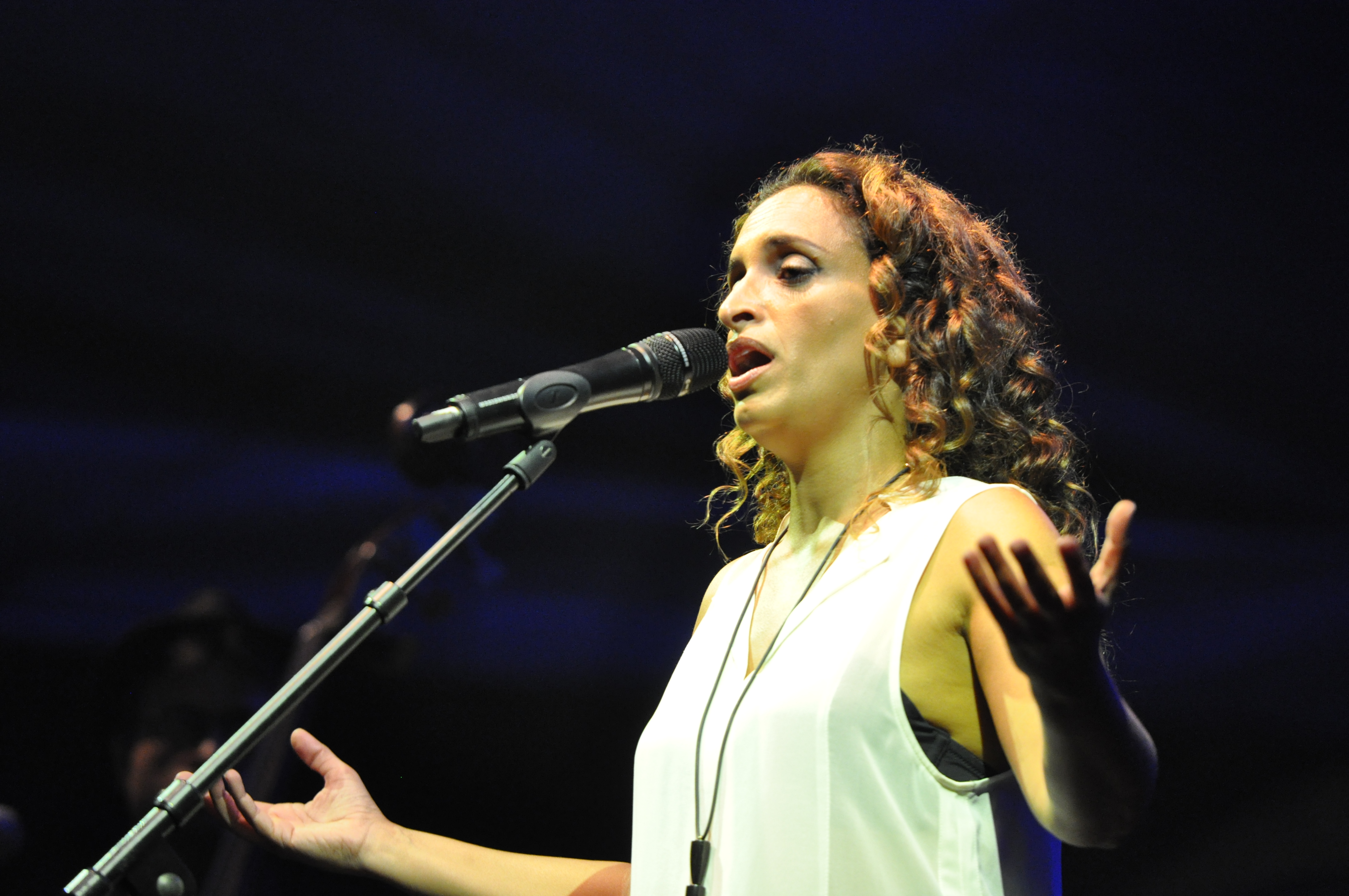
Achinoam Nini at Bardentreffen 2014

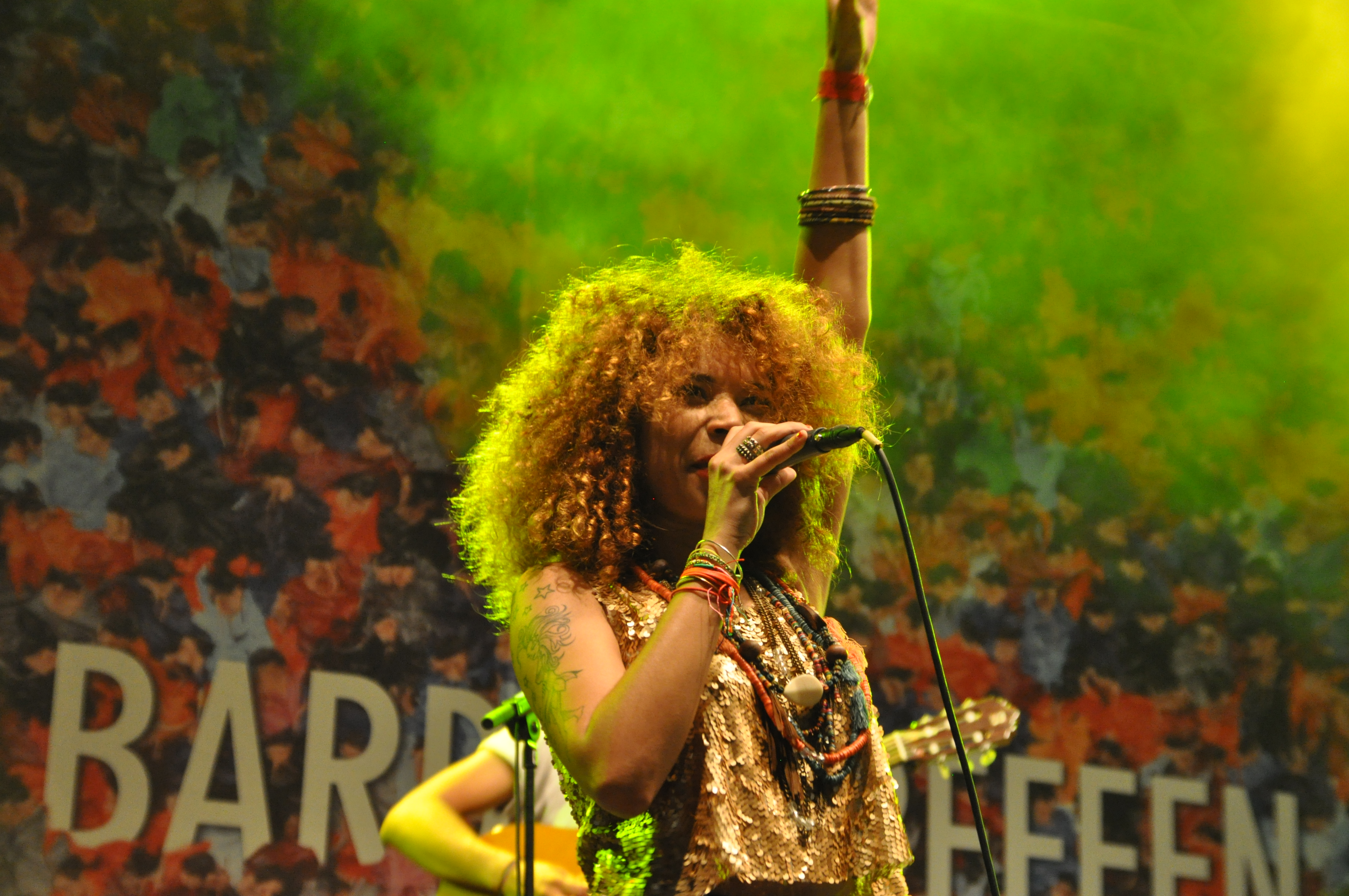
Flavia Coelho at Bardentreffen 2013

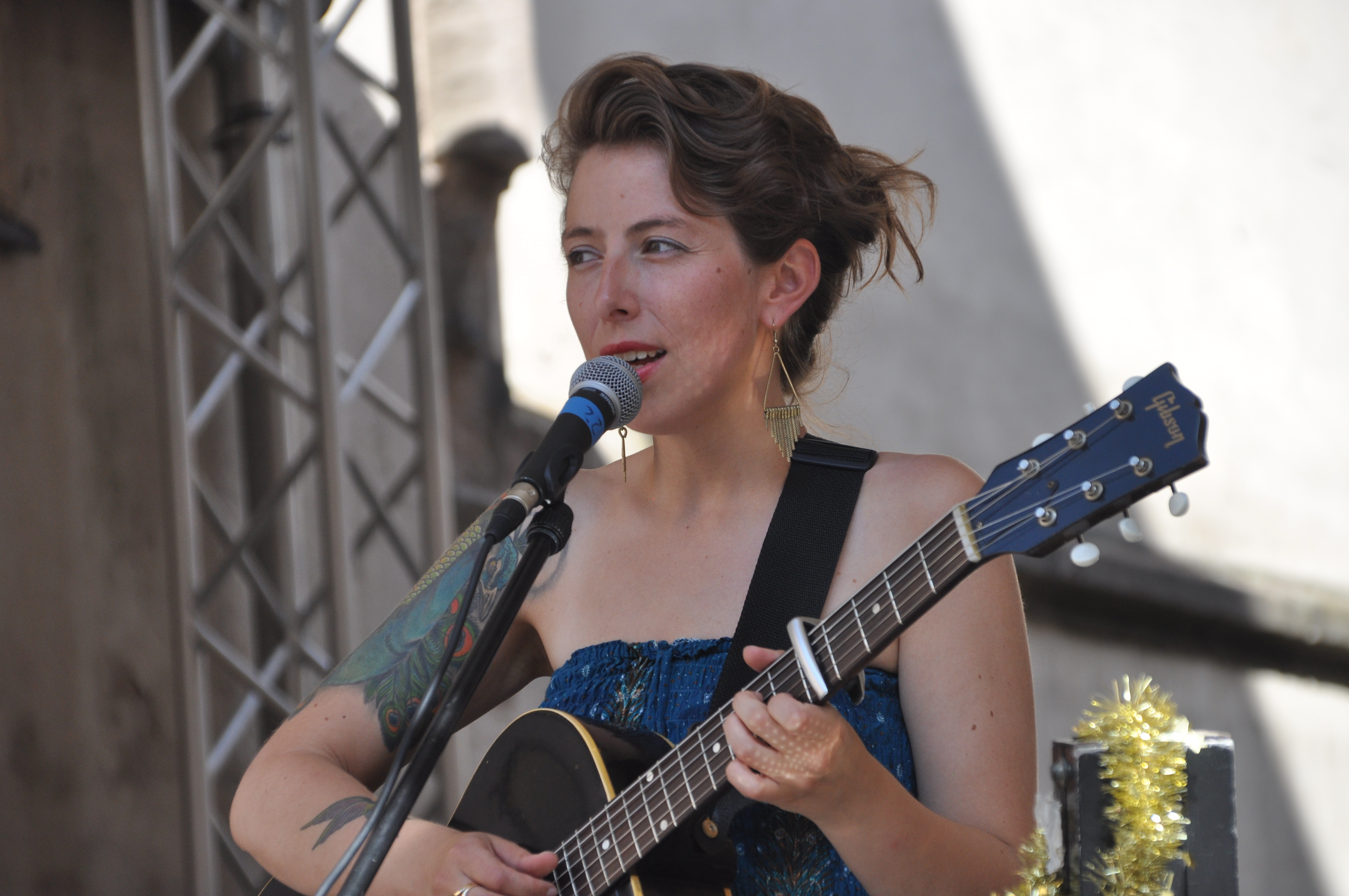
Guðrið Hansdóttir at Bardentreffen 2013

The Bardentreffen (German for bards' meeting) is an annual open-air music festival in Nuremberg, Germany. The first Bardentreffen took place on the 400th anniversary of the death of meistersinger Hans Sachs in 1976.

== Setup ==
The venues are spread over the whole historical city and the event takes place on the first weekend of the school summer holidays in Bavaria. Starting with a more political approach including singer songwriter groups of the political left, the Bardentreffen grew into a more multicultural approach and has established itself as an important venue for professional and amateur bands of world music.

There are no entry tickets, the city of Nuremberg and various sponsors take care of band fees and organization. Charly Fischer was head of the organization of the Bardentreffen for nearly 30 years and went into retreat 2014. Besides "official" sponsored gigs, a part of the city is open for amateurs.

== Style ==
The background of the group is traditional folk, "Trends" and "experimental", however any band taking part has to mix own vocals and instruments, instrumental only and mere cover bands are not allowed. Venues comprise among others the Hauptmarkt, Lorenzer Platz, Sebalder Platz, the Schütt island and St. Katharina. Famous contributors include among other Klaus Lage, Konstantin Wecker, Mark Gillespie, Alan Stivell, Fiddler's Green, The Cat Empire, Barbara Thalheim, Kvitretten, Joan Armatrading, Leningrad Cowboys, Donnie Munro, Vadim Kurilev, Anne Clark, Astrid North and LaBrassBanda. It is an official policy to provide a genuine mix of newcomers and established bands.

== Special motto ==
In 2014, the festival used the motto "war and peace" referring to the centenary of the beginning of World War I. Pippo Pollina and Aziza Brahim were among the most famous acts on the festival. The 2014 festival has been deemed the largest world music festival in Germany, starring 368 artists from 31 nations.
