= Eileen Ivers =

American fiddler (born 1965)

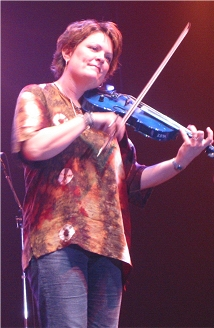
- Eileen Ivers on stage in Lorient, Brittany in 2003

Background information
- Born: 13 July 1965 (age 61)
- Genres: bluegrass music, Irish traditional music, old-time music, world music
- Occupation: American fiddler
- Instruments: fiddle, mandolin
- Labels: Green Linnet; Sony Classical; Koch Records
- Website: http://www.eileenivers.com/

Eileen Ivers (born July 13, 1965) is an American fiddler.

== Early life ==
Ivers was born in New York City of Irish-born parents, grew up in the Bronx and attended St. Barnabas High School. She spent summers in Ireland and took up the fiddle at the age of nine. Her teacher was the Irish fiddler Martin Mulvihill. She toured with Mick Moloney's band The Green Fields of America, founded in 1977. She graduated magna cum laude from Iona College in New York and has done post-graduate work in mathematics.

== Career ==
Ivers' signature indigo-blue electric violin in nicknamed "Wild Blue."

A founding member of Cherish the Ladies, she recorded and toured with them for several years. She has played with the London Symphony Orchestra and The Chieftains. Ivers was an inaugural member of the Independent Music Awards' judging panel to support independent artists.

During the 1990s, she spent a year touring with Hall & Oates. She also played with a group called Paddy A Go Go, which mixed Celtic music and hip-hop. In 1995, she replaced the original fiddler in the Riverdance Irish dance troupe and toured with them. In 1999, Riverdance was transferring to Broadway, but Ivers chose to leave to found her first band, Immigrant Soul.

Ivers has been featured on multiple soundtracks, including The Brothers McMullen (1995), River of Sound (1995), and Some Mother's Son (1996). She recorded a traditional air for the film Gangs of New York (2002), entitled "Lament for Stalker Wallace," which can be found on the compilation album So Far: The Eileen Ivers Collection 1979-1995.

== Discography ==
=== Studio albums ===
List of studio albums, with selected details and chart positions
| Title | Album details | Peak chart positions |
| Title | Album details | AUS |
|---|---|---|
| Fresh Takes (featuring with John Whelan) | Released: 1987; Label: Green Linnet; Format: LP, CD, cassette | — |
| Traditional Irish Music | Released: 1994; Label: Green Linnet; Format: LP, CD | — |
| Wild Blue | Released: 1996; Label: Green Linnet; Format: CD | — |
| Crossing the Bridge | Released: 1999; Label: Sony Classical; Format: CD | 96 |
| Eileen Ivers and Immigrant Soul (with Immigrant Soul) | Released: 2002; Label: Vivo; Format: CD | — |
| An Nollaig – An Irish Christmas | Released: October 2007; Label: Compass; Format: CD | — |
| Beyond the Bog Road | Released: March 2016; Label: eOne; Format: CD, digital | — |
| Scatter the Light | Released: March 2020; Label: eOne; Format: CD, digital | — |

=== Compilation albums ===
List of compilation albums, with selected details
| Title | Details |
|---|---|
| So Far: The Eileen Ivers Collection 1979–1995 | Released: 1997; Format: CD; Label: Green Linnet |
| The Best of 1979-1996 | Released: 1999; Format: CD; Label: Earth Songs |

=== As a session or guest musician ===
- Riverdance: Music from the Show (1995)
- Song of the Irish Whistle by Joanie Madden (1996)
- "The Celtic Album" by The Boston Pops Orchestra (1998)
- "The Fiddling Ladies" by The Chieftains on the album Tears of Stone (1999)
- "Becoming" by Micheál Ó Súilleabháin (1998)
- Celtic Solstice by Paul Winter (1999)
- Seed by Afro Celt Sound System (2003)
- "New York Town" by Black 47 on the album New York Town (2004)
- Voice of Hope by Tommy Fleming
- Absolutely Irish, a multi-artist session recording (2008)
- Into the Deep: America, Whaling & The World by Brian Keane (2010)
- An Irish Christmas by Keith and Kristyn Getty (2011)
- Copper: Original Soundtrack by Brian Keane (2013)
