= Seamus Egan =

Irish musician

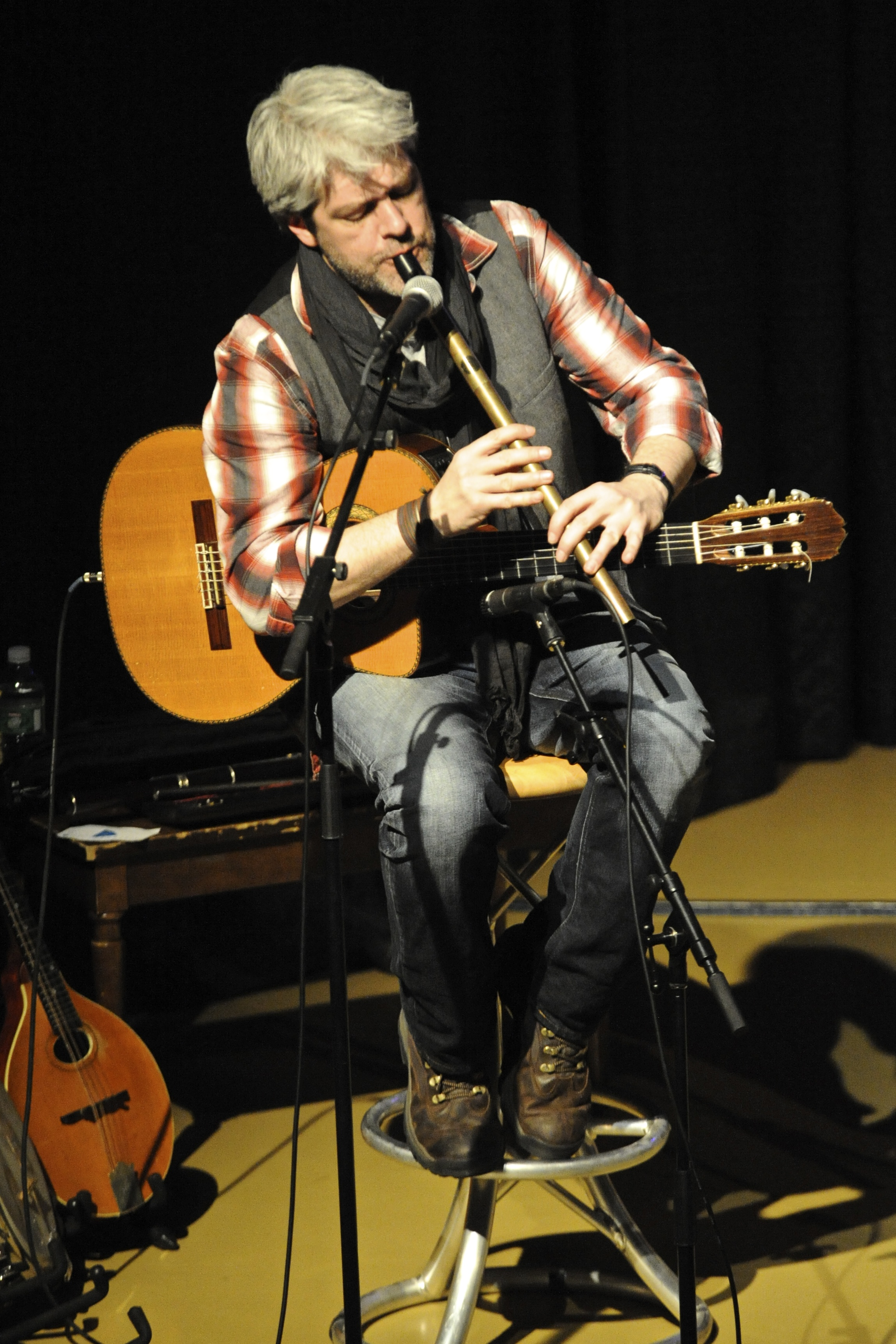
- Séamus Egan

Background information
- Born: 1 July 1969 (age 56)
- Occupation: Irish-American musician
- Instruments: flute, whistle, tenor banjo, mandolin, guitar, tres, uilleann pipes

Seamus Egan (b. 1 July 1969) is an Irish-American musician.

== Later work ==
In 1992 he joined Susan McKeown's band The Chanting House and appeared on a live album with them. Eileen Ivers was also a member of the band. In 1994 he founded Solas and has been on every one of their albums. In 1995 he recorded music for the quirky low-budget film The Brothers McMullen, directed by Edward Burns. He also co-wrote the hit "I Will Remember You" with Dave Merenda and Sarah McLachlan.

== Discography ==
=== Solo albums ===
- Traditional Music Of Ireland (1985)
- A Week In January (1990)
- When Juniper Sleeps (1996)
- Early Bright (2020)

=== Seamus Egan, Eugene O'Donnell & Mick Moloney ===
- Three Way Street (1993)

=== As session musician ===
- The Brothers McMullen (Soundtrack) (1995)
- Richard Shindell, Blue Divide (1995)
- Eileen Ivers, Wild Blue (1996)
- Celtic Tapestry (1999)

=== With Solas ===
- Solas (1996)
- Sunny Spells and Scattered Showers (1997)
- The Words That Remain (1998)
- The Hour Before Dawn (2000)
- The Edge of Silence (2002)
- Another Day (2003)
- Waiting for an Echo (2005)
- Reunion-A Decade of Solas (CD/DVD) (2006)
- For Love and Laughter (2008)
- The Turning Tide (2010)
- Shamrock City (2013)
- All These Years (2016)
