= Seán Keane (singer) =

Irish singer and musician (born 1961)

- Born: 24 August 1961 (age 64); Sylan, County Galway, Ireland
- Genres: Celtic, folk
- Occupation: Singer
- Years active: 1980–present

Seán Keane (born 24 August 1961) is an Irish singer and musician, known for his distinctive sean-nós-style voice.

== Background ==
Seán Keane was born in a small village called Sylan near Tuam in County Galway into a musical family, including his sister Dolores. He took a first prize in the Connacht Fleadh for singing in English.

== Career ==
Together with Frances Black and others he was a founder member of the group Arcady. He was voted Performer of the Year by readers of Irish Music Magazine in 1997/1998 and 1998/1999, and called "the greatest Irish musical find of the `90's" (London Independent), and "the fastest rising star of the Irish music scene" (Irish Times). His musical voice is unique, and his songs encompass a mixture of traditional Irish folk music, pop, blues, and country. Seán Keane has released eleven solo albums and collaborated on five others.

== Discography ==
- All Heart No Roses - 1994
- Turn A Phrase - 1996
- No Stranger - 1998
- The Man That I Am - 2000
- Seansongs - 2002
- Portrait - The Best Of Sean Keane - 2003
- You Got Gold - 2006
- An Irish Scattering - 2008
- Valley Of The Heart - 2009
- Never Alone - 2013
- Christmas by the hearth - 2014
- New Day Dawning - 2016
- Gratitude - 2018 (with the RTÉ Concert Orchestra)

== DVDs ==
- The Irish Scattering - 2008
- Shane Quinn Live - 2016
