= Mick Moloney =

Irish-American musician and scholar

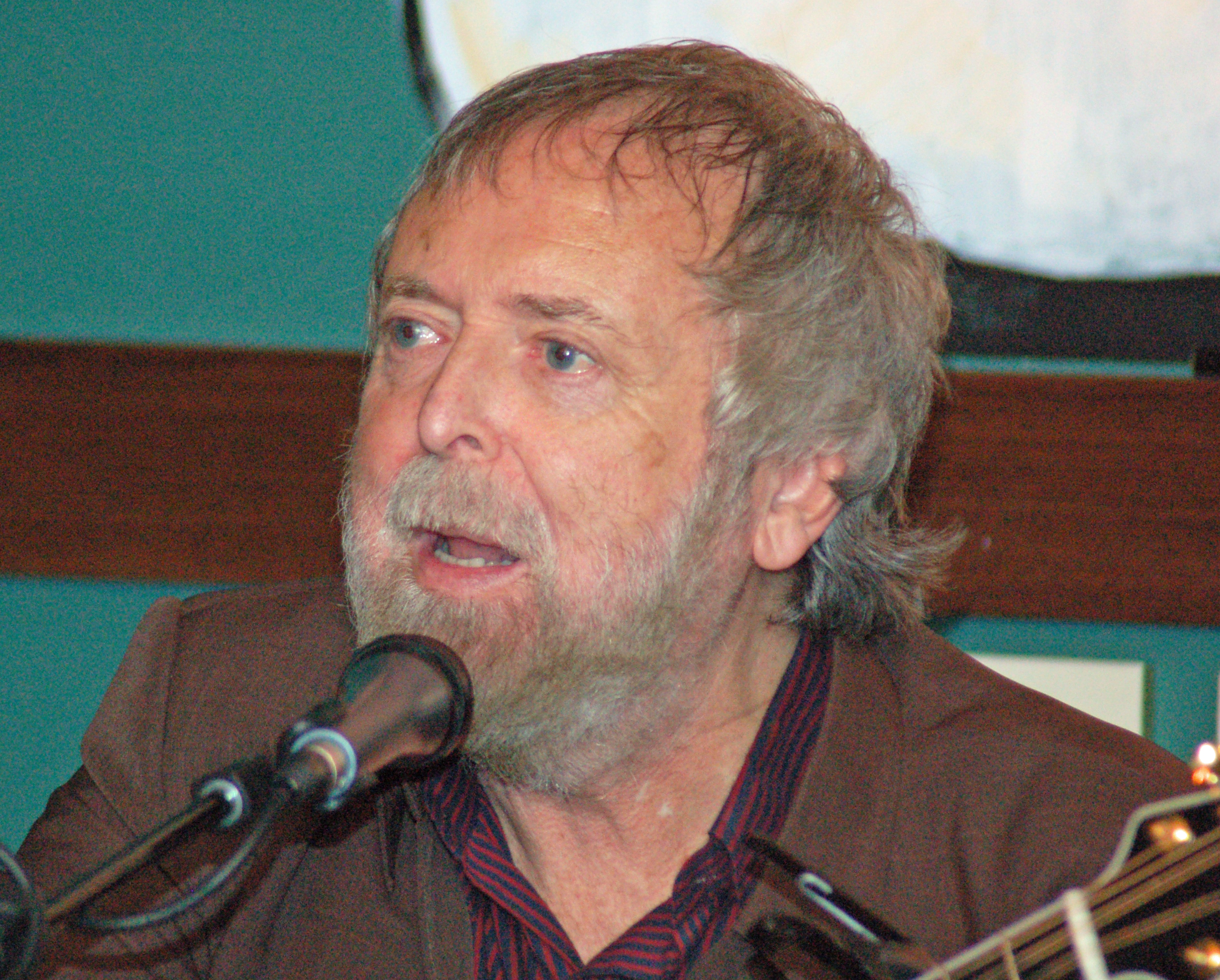
- Moloney in 2008

Background information
- Born: Michael Moloney; 15 November 1944; Limerick, Ireland
- Died: 27 July 2022 (aged 77) Manhattan, New York City, US
- Genres: Traditional Irish, folk
- Occupations: Musician, singer, folklorist
- Instruments: Vocals, tenor banjo, mandolin, octave mandolin, guitar
- Years active: 1964–2022
- Website: www.mickmoloney.com

Michael Moloney (15 November 1944 – 27 July 2022) was an Irish-born American musician and scholar. He was the artistic director of several major arts tours and co-founded Green Fields of America.

== Early life ==
Moloney was born in Limerick, Ireland, on 15 November 1944. His father, Michael, was the head air traffic control officer of Shannon Airport; his mother, Maura, worked as the principal of a Limerick primary school. Moloney first played tenor banjo during his teenage years. He studied at the University College Dublin, graduating with a bachelor's degree in economics. He then relocated to London to be a social worker assisting immigrant communities, before joining the Johnstons. After playing with the group for five years, he immigrated to the United States in 1973. He initially settled in Philadelphia and eventually became an American citizen.

== Career ==
Three years after moving to the US, Moloney co-founded Green Fields of America, an ensemble of Irish musicians, singers, and dancers which toured across the US on several occasions. He also served as the artistic director for several major arts tours. One of these was the 1985 festival in Manhattan titled "Cherish the Ladies" to highlight female musicians in the area of Irish traditional music, which had been dominated by men until that decade. He produced an album for the female group by the same name titled Irish Women Musicians in America. The group's leader, Joanie Madden, was one of several future fellows of the National Endowment for the Arts (NEA) to be mentored by Moloney. He produced and performed on over 70 albums and served as advisor for numerous festivals and concerts across America, with ethnomusicologist and musician Daniel T. Neely putting the figure as high as 125 albums.

Moloney undertook postgraduate studies at the University of Pennsylvania, obtaining a master's degree before being awarded a Doctor of Philosophy in folklore and folk life in 1992. He went on to teach ethnomusicology, folklore, and Irish studies at Penn, Georgetown University, and Villanova University. He was also global distinguished professor of music and Irish studies at New York University until his death. In recognition of his work in public folklore, he received a 1999 National Heritage Fellowship from the NEA.

In addition to music performance, Moloney wrote Far From the Shamrock Shore: The Story of Irish American History Through Song, which was published by Crown Publications in February 2002 with a supplementary CD on Shanachie Records. He hosted three nationally syndicated series covering folk music on American Public Television. He worked as a consultant, performer, and interviewee on the RTÉ special Bringing It All Back Home, and was also a participant, consultant, and music arranger for Out of Ireland, a documentary film by PBS. Moloney performed on the PBS special The Irish in America: Long Journey Home.

== Personal life and death ==
He was married three times over the course of his life. His first marriage was to Miriam Murphy. His second marriage was to Philomena Murray. Together, they had one child. They eventually divorced. His third marriage, to Judy Sherman, also ended in divorce. He was in a domestic partnership with Sangjan Chailungka at the time of his death. During his later years, he divided his time between Bangkok – where he resided with Chailungka – and his apartment in Greenwich Village. In Bangkok, he volunteered as a music therapist and teacher for abandoned children with HIV at the Mercy Center in the Khlong Toei slums, which was founded by the Redemptorist priest Joseph H. Maier.

Moloney died on 27 July 2022, at his home in Manhattan, having played at the Maine Celtic Festival less than a week before. He was 77; the cause of death was not announced.

== Awards ==
- 1999 National Heritage Fellowship
- 2000 Pew Fellowships in the Arts
- 2013 Presidential Distinguished Service Awards for the Irish Abroad

== Discography ==
Solo

- We Have Met Together (Transatlantic, 1973)
- Strings Attached (Green Linnet, 1980)
- Far From the Shamrock Shore (Shanachie, 2002)
- McNally’s Row of Flats (Compass, 2006)
- If It Wasn't For The Irish And The Jews (Compass, 2009)

With Eugene O’Donnell

- Mick Moloney With Eugene O'Donnell (Green Linnet, 1978)
- Slow Airs & Set Dances (Green Linnet, 1978)
- Uncommon Bonds (Green Linnet, 1984)

With Robbie O’Connell and Jimmy Keane

- There Were Roses (w/ Liz Carroll) (Green Linnet, 1986)
- Kilkelly (Green Linnet, 1987)

With Eugene O’Donnell and Seamus Egan

- Three Way Street (Green Linnet, 1993)

With Martin Mulvihill

- Traditional Irish Fiddling From County Limerick (Green Linnet/Innisfree, 1978)

With Eddie Cahill

- Ah! Surely (Shanachie, 1979)

With Athena Tergis

- An Irish Christmas (A Musical Solstice Celebration) (Irish Arts Center, 2011)

With the Irish Tradition

- The Corner House (Green Linnet, 1978) [Moloney plays on four tracks]

With Niamh Ní Charra

- Cuz - A Tribute To Terry "Cuz" Teahan (Imeartas Records/The Arts Council of Ireland, 2013) [Moloney plays on two tracks]
