= Grant Gershon =

American conductor and pianist

- Born: November 10, 1960 (age 65); Norwalk, California, U.S.
- Origin: Alhambra, California
- Genre: Classical choral music
- Occupations: Conductor, pianist
- Years active: 1980s–present
- Labels: Decca, Nonesuch, Cantaloupe Music

Grant Gershon (born November 10, 1960) is a multi-Grammy Award-winning American conductor and pianist. He is the artistic director of the Los Angeles Master Chorale, formerly resident conductor of the Los Angeles Opera, member of the board of councillors for the USC Thornton School of Music and a former member of the Chorus America board of directors.

Beyond his work with the Los Angeles Master Chorale, he is also a champion of new music. He conducted the world premiere of John Adams opera Girls of the Golden West and Adams' opera/theatre piece, I Was Looking at the Ceiling and Then I Saw the Sky, directed by Peter Sellars. He and pianist Gloria Cheng premiered Hallelujah Junction, a piano-duo piece written for them by John Adams. In February 2007, he conducted the world premiere of Ricky Ian Gordon's opera, The Grapes of Wrath with Minnesota Opera, along with following performances with Utah Opera. In 2010, Gershon led the world premiere performances of Il Postino by Daniel Catán, featuring Plácido Domingo as the poet Pablo Neruda.

== Biography ==
=== Personal history ===
Gershon was born in Norwalk, California, and grew up in Alhambra, California. His mother was a piano teacher, and he began music lessons at five years old. After graduating from Alhambra High School, he entered Chapman College in Orange, California, as a double major in piano and voice; he later transferred to the University of Southern California, where he majored in piano. He eventually graduated cum laude with a Bachelor of Music degree in 1985.

Gershon is married to soprano Elissa Johnston.

=== Professional career ===
Gershon has appeared as guest conductor with the Los Angeles Philharmonic, the National Symphony Orchestra, the Baltimore Symphony Orchestra, the San Francisco Symphony, San Francisco Opera, Houston Grand Opera, Santa Fe Opera, Minnesota Opera, Royal Swedish Opera, Juilliard Opera Theatre, Saint Paul Chamber Orchestra, Los Angeles Chamber Orchestra, the Gustav Mahler Chamber Orchestra and the Finnish Avanti! Chamber Orchestra, among others. He has led performances at many of the world's most prestigious festivals, including the Salzburg Festival, Ravinia, Edinburgh, Vienna, Aspen, Ojai and Helsinki festivals as well as the Roma-Europa Festival and the Festival Otonno in Madrid.

Gershon became assistant conductor of the Los Angeles Philharmonic under Esa-Pekka Salonen in 1994, a position he held until 1997. Prior to that he served as assistant conductor and principal pianist with Los Angeles Opera from 1988 to 1994, where he participated in over 40 productions and garnered a reputation as one of the country's exceptional vocal coaches.

Early in his career he served as assistant conductor at the Salzburg Festival, the Berlin State Opera and the Aix-en-Provence Festival, working with conductors Esa-Pekka Salonen, Daniel Barenboim and Claudio Abbado. He has served as pianist for many artists on recording and in recital, including Kiri Te Kanawa, Peter Schreier, Rod Gilfry and Audra McDonald.

In May 2000, Gershon was named music director of the Los Angeles Master Chorale effective Fall 2001, taking over for Paul Salamunovich who was retiring. He is only the fourth conductor to hold that title. During this time, he has conducted over 250 performances at the Walt Disney Concert Hall, and has led the chorus in a number of world premieres, including:

- Iri da Iri by Esa-Pekka Salonen
- "the national anthems" and "before and after nature" by David Lang
- "Malhaar" by Swan Family Artist-in-Residence Reena Esmail
- "In the Arms of the Beloved" by Billy Childs
- Inscapes by Swan Family Composer-in-Residence Shawn Kirchner
- You Are (Variations) by Steve Reich
- Requiem by Christopher Rouse
- The City of Dis by Louis Andriessen
- "Los cantores de las montañas" (The Singing Mountaineers) by Gabriela Lena Frank
- Plath Songs by Shawn Kirchner
- A Map of Los Angeles by David O
- SANG by Eve Beglarian
- Messages and Brief Eternity by Bobby McFerrin and Roger Treece, lyrics by Don Rosler
- Broken Charms by Donald Crockett
- Rezos (Prayers) by Tania León
- Mother's Lament by Sharon Farber
- The Salvage Men by Jeff Beal
- Mangá Pakalagián (Ceremonies) by Nilo Alcala
- Ave Maria/Scarborough Fair by Paul Chihara
- In the Desert With You by Moira Smiley

He led the U.S. premiere of Rufus Wainwright's "Dream Requiem", and Two Songs to Poems of Ann Jäderlund by Esa-Pekka Salonen with the Master Chorale, along with other U.S. premieres of works by composers James MacMillan, Tarik O'Regan, Sofia Gubaidulina and Mark-Anthony Turnage.

On May 21, 2007, the Los Angeles Opera and Los Angeles Master Chorale issued a joint press release. In it, they announced that Gershon would be extending his contract with the Master Chorale through the 2010/2011 season, and that he was being named associate conductor and chorus master of Los Angeles Opera. In the press release, Plácido Domingo called Gershon "an exceptional musician whose broad musical interests, technical mastery and impressive experience will be a huge asset to LA Opera". In this position at LA Opera Gershon has conducted over 50 performances, including La traviata, Madama Butterfly, Carmen, Philip Glass's Satyagraha, Handel's L'Allegro, il Penseroso ed il Moderato in Mark Morris's production, and the previously cited Il Postino.

On May 18, 2014, the Los Angeles Master Chorale issued a press release, in which they announced that Gershon would be extending his contract with the Master Chorale through the 2019/2020 season. With this renewal, Gershon's title will change to artistic director, which reflects his desire to "redefine the choral experience". With this expanded role, Gershon will create an "immersive" concert experience by incorporating lighting, staging, video, movement, and attire into the production. The Chorale will seek to engage new audiences by presenting more concerts at venues outside of Disney Hall and the Hollywood Bowl.

== Recordings ==
Gershon won the Grammy Award for Best Choral Performance in 2026 for his role as chorus master in Gabriela Ortíz's "Revolución Diamantina" with the LA Philharmonic and Los Angeles Master Chorale. He was also nominated for a Grammy Award in the same category that year for his role as conductor in Billy Child's "In the Arms of the Beloved" with violinist Anne Akiko Meyers.

Gershon won the Grammy Award for Best Choral Performance in 2022 for his role as chorus master in Gustav Mahler's Symphony #8 with the LA Philharmonic and Los Angeles Master Chorale

Gershon has made eight recordings with the Los Angeles Master Chorale:

- "Beloved" with violinist Anne Akiko Meyers, music by Billy Childs, Eric Whitacre and Ola Gjielo
- Itaipú by Philip Glass and Two Songs to Poems of Ann Jäderlund by Esa-Pekka Salonen (RCM 12004)
- You Are (Variations) by Steve Reich (Nonesuch)
- Daniel Variations by Steve Reich (Nonesuch)
- A Good Understanding by Nico Muhly (Decca)
- Miserere by Henryk Górecki (Decca)
- the national anthems by David Lang (Cantaloupe)
- A Festival of Carols

Gershon has conducted two DVD releases with LA Opera featuring Plácido Domingo

- Il Postino by Daniel Catán
- Gianni Schicchi by Giacomo Puccini

He served as chorus master on the following Grammy Award winning recordings: John Corigliano's The Ghosts of Versailles with LA Opera. Gabriela Ortiz's "Revolución diamantína" with the Los Angeles Master Chorale and LA Philharmonic Thomas Ades's Dante with the Los Angeles Master Chorale and LA Philharmonic

== Awards and recognition ==
- In 2026, Gershon received the Grammy Award for Best Choral Performance.
- In 2022, Gershon received the Grammy Award for Best Choral Performance.
- In 2022, Gershon and the Los Angeles Master Chorale were awarded The American Prize for Choral Performance.
- Also in 2022, he received the Michael Korn Award—Chorus America's highest honor.
- In 2017, the Los Angeles Master Chorale was inducted into the Classical Music Hall of Fame.
- In 2015, Gershon received the Louis Botto Award for Entrepreneurial Zeal and Innovative Action from Chorus America.
- In 2012, under Gershon's direction the Los Angeles Master Chorale received the Margaret Hillis Award for Choral Excellence from Chorus America.
- Gershon was honored with the WQXR Gramophone America Award for 2006 for his recording of Reich's You Are (Variations). In addition, The New York Times, The Washington Post and Newsday, among others, selected it as one of the top ten classical recordings of 2005.
- He was named USC Thornton School of Music Outstanding Alumnus of the Year in May 2002
