= St. Charles Borromeo Church (North Hollywood) =

Catholic church located in California, United States

Coordinates: 34.14991°N 118.36599°W

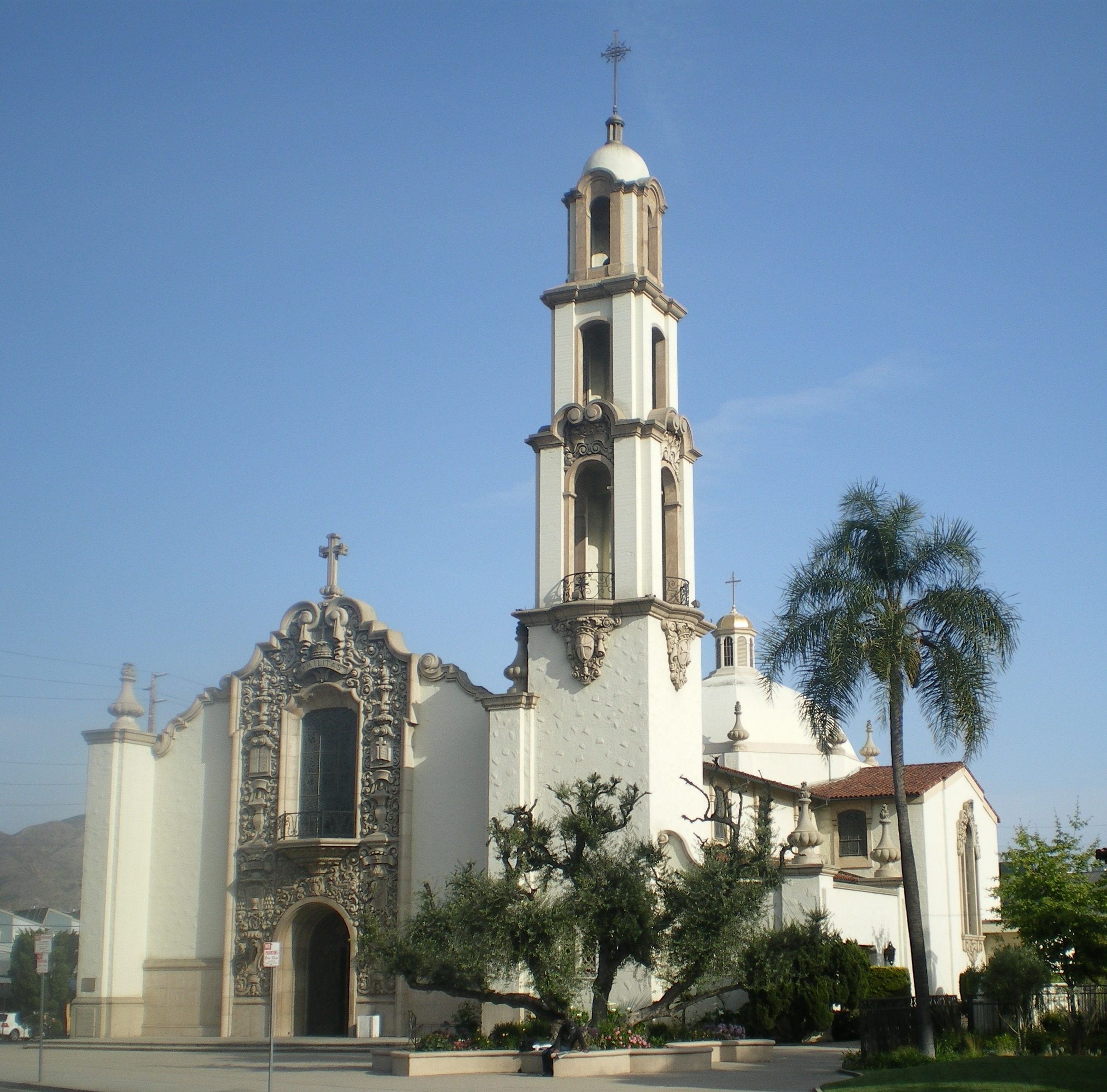
- St. Charles Borromeo Church
- Location: United States
- Denomination: Roman Catholic
- Website: www.stcharlesborromeochurch.org

Clergy
- Bishop: Albert Bahhuth
- Pastor: Fr. Jose Magaña

St. Charles Borromeo Church is a Catholic church and elementary school in North Hollywood, Los Angeles, California. It is one of the oldest parishes in the San Fernando Valley, dating back to 1921. It has long been a parish with celebrity members and was the site of funerals for Bob Hope, Dorothy Lamour, and Robert Urich, among other notables.

== History ==
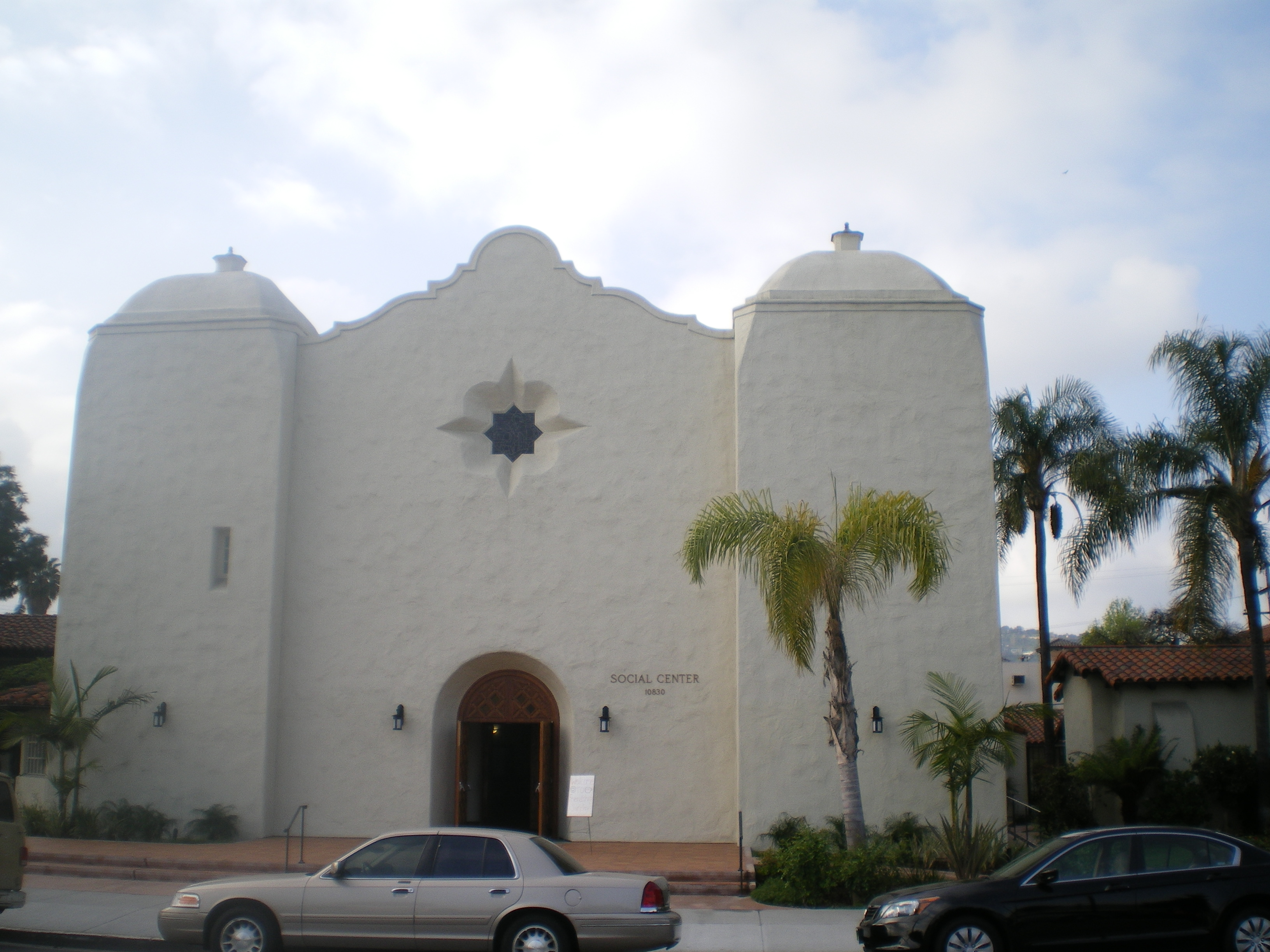
St. Charles Borromeo Parish Hall (Old Church)

=== Beginnings ===
The parish was founded in 1921 with the purchase of an existing Methodist church structure at Weddington and Bakman. The parish was known as Immaculate Conception Church until 1925 when it was renamed Saint Charles Borromeo. Before the parish was established, Catholics in the central San Fernando Valley shared a priest with St. Robert Bellarmine (then known as Holy Trinity). By 1936, the parish had outgrown the space on Weddington, and a parishioner named Goykes donated land on Moorpark. A new church was built on Moorpark in 1937—the structure that is now the parish hall. The church had a seating capacity of 600 and was styled after the San Carlos Mission in Carmel, California.

In 1939, St. Charles Borromeo School opened in four portable bungalows and operated by five Sisters of Charity of the Blessed Virgin Mary. A new permanent school opened in 1947 in a building with 14 classrooms, a cafeteria, library, music room, and auditorium.

The parish continued to grow in the years after World War II, and in 1957, ground was broken for the current church. The new church opened at Thanksgiving 1959 with a blessing from James Francis Cardinal McIntyre. St. Charles Borromeo served a wide swath of the San Fernando Valley for many years, but with the population growth in the Valley, additional parishes were carved out of the territory previously encompassed by St. Charles Borromeo. Modern parishes that were carved out of St. Charles Borromeo include Our Lady of the Holy Rosary in Sun Valley (1937), St. Francis de Sales in Sherman Oaks (1938), St. Finbar in Burbank (1938) and St. Patrick in North Hollywood (1948).

The Rev. Msgr. Harry C. Meade was the pastor at St. Charles Borromeo for more than a quarter century starting in 1936.

=== St. Charles Borromeo Choir ===
The St. Charles Borromeo Choir has enjoyed a long reputation as one of Southern California's finest parish choral groups. Prior to 1949, the choir director was Roger Wagner, who later formed the Roger Wagner Chorale. In 1949, Paul Salamunovich became director of the choir. Volunteer singers from Santa Barbara to San Pedro drove to North Hollywood to sing for Salamunovich as part of the St. Charles Choir.

The St. Charles Boys Choir under Salamunovich appeared with Dinah Shore on the Chevy Show and The Lucy Show with Lucille Ball in 1965. Later that year, they also formed the Disneyland Boys Choir, with which Salamunovich recorded the It's a Small World album of folk songs still sold at Disney theme parks. Former members of the St. Charles Boys Choir include former chairman of the Joint Chiefs of Staff, Admiral Michael Mullen and former UCLA head football coach Terry Donahue.

Salamunovich also became the leader of the Los Angeles Master Chorale from 1991 to 2001 and remains their Music Director Emeritus. Most notably, the St. Charles Choir has sung for Pope John Paul II in private audience at the Vatican, for the official Mass of Greeting with the Pope presiding in St. Vibiana's Cathedral in Los Angeles and in St. Peter's Square on the Feasts of St.'s Peter and Paul with the Pope presiding in high Mass. They hold the distinction of being the only American choir to be honored with this invitation.

The St. Charles Choir has performed on the soundtracks of the motion pictures, Air Force One, My Best Friend's Wedding, First Knight, Waterworld, The Devil's Advocate, xXx, Flatliners, Grand Canyon and True Confessions, on which he also coached Robert De Niro on the sung responses of the Latin Mass. They have also performed on television including The NBC Doc Severinson Christmas Special. Salamunovich conducted the choir at the 10:00 a.m. Mass for 60 years before retiring in June 2009. He died on April 3, 2014.

=== Renovations ===
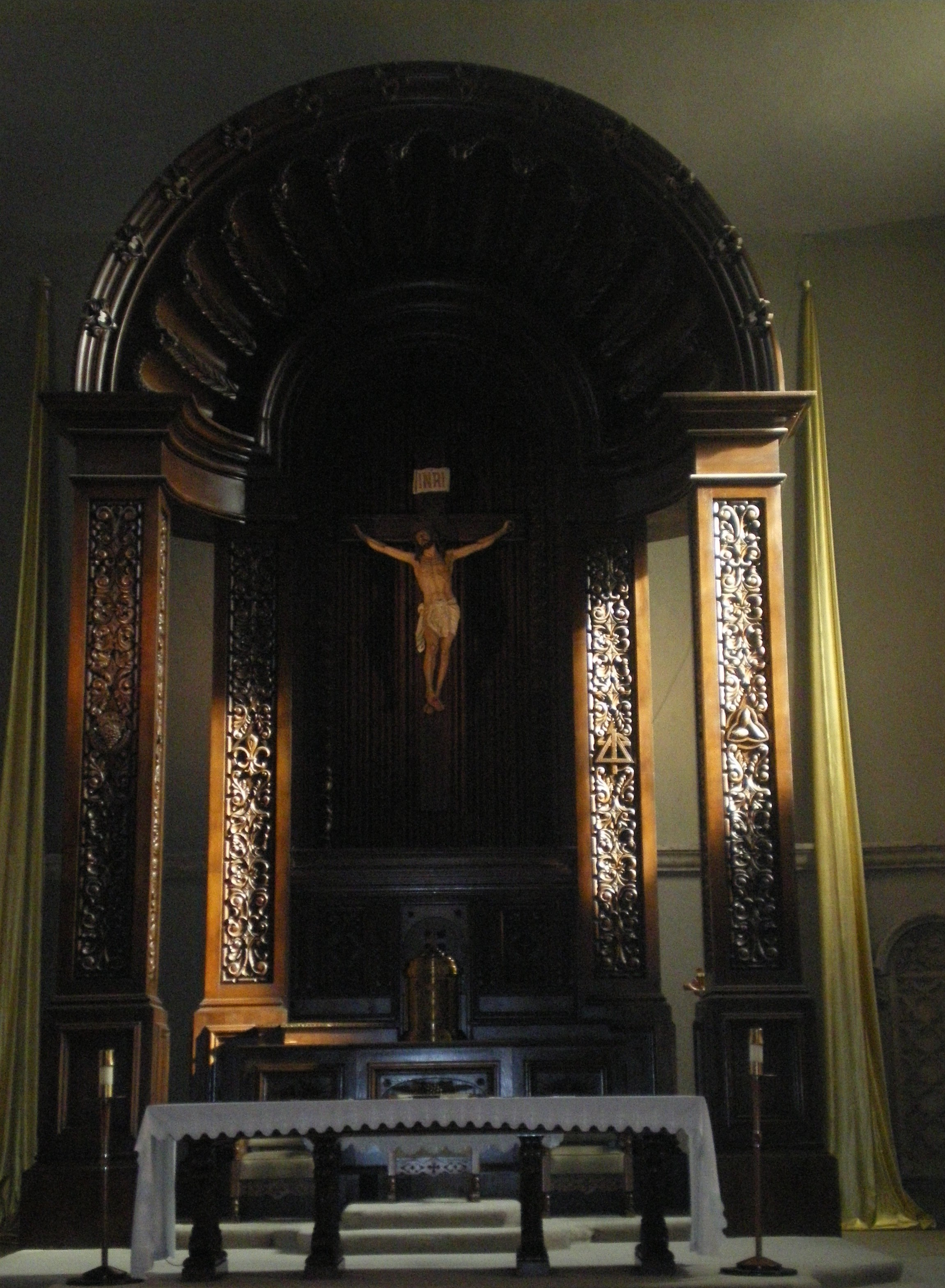
Altar at St. Charles Borromeo

In 2002 and 2003, controversy followed after well-known consultant, Richard S. Vosko, was brought in to speak to the congregation about renovations to the church's interior. Vosko's renovations in Detroit, San Antonio, and New Orleans had spawned controversy, and a book called "Ugly as Sin" had recently been published criticizing Vosko's work.

Concerns over modernization of St. Charles Borromeo's interior space led to the formation of the St. Charles Borromeo Preservation Guild. Guild supporters held protests with dozens of protesters falling to their knees outside the church and reciting the rosary asking the Virgin Mary to intercede to prevent modernization. Among other things, the protesters sought to return the Blessed Sacrament to the tabernacle behind the altar and to preserve the private confessionals, the interior's "dark beauty," kneelers, the large, dramatic wooden crucifix and the baldacchino hanging above the cross. The traditional look and feel of St. Charles had become a refuge for traditional Catholics who rejected the secular look of modern Catholic churches.

Pastor Robert Gallagher responded angrily to the protests. In the church bulletin, he claimed that most of the protesters were not parishioners and said it was insulting to suggest that it was the traditional trappings that attracted parishioners. The protests drew widespread media attention, including two feature articles in the Los Angeles Times in April 2002 and June 2003.

In August 2013- April 2014 the church started remodeling. During the remodel the church was moved to the parish hall, during Christmas the patio from the parish hall and parish center was used for overflow crowding. The remodel was to add a 2nd tier to the altar, paint the dome, remove asbestos, and add a disabled stall in the restrooms. The library was moved to the parish hall, and windows were cut in the entrance of the church for light.

== Notable people ==
=== Cardinal Mahony ===
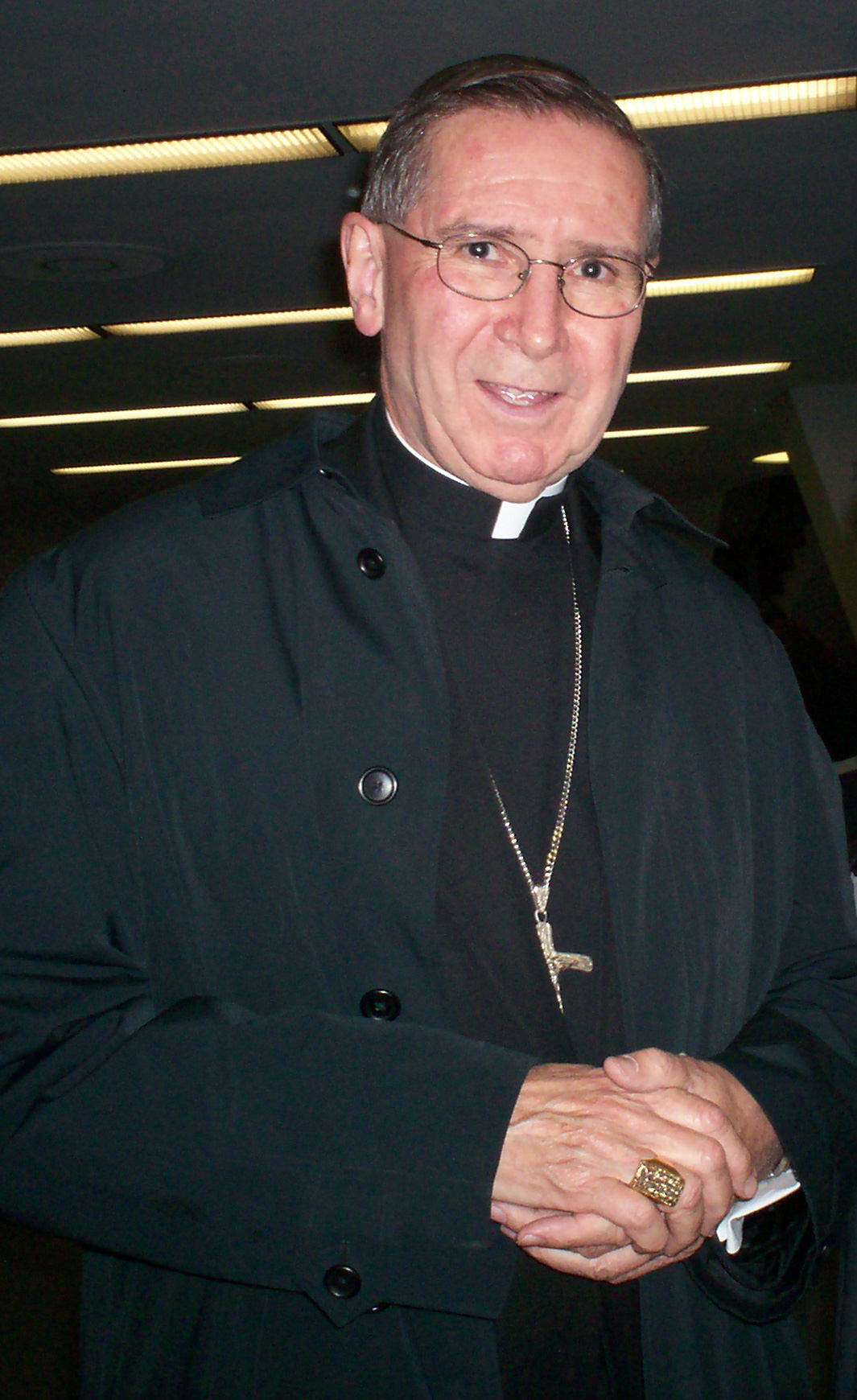
Cardinal Mahony graduated from St. Charles School

St. Charles Borromeo also has long ties with Cardinal Roger Mahony, the Archbishop of the Los Angeles Archdiocese since 1985. Mahony's parents were married at the original church on Weddington Street, and he went to grammar school at St. Charles Borromeo grammar school, graduating in 1950. When Mahony's mother, Loretta Mahony, died in 1995, he celebrated her funeral Mass at St. Charles Borromeo. Mahony also celebrated the parish's 75 anniversary Mass in November 1996.

In 2000, Mahony attended the 50th reunion of the eighth-grade class of 1950. Sister Jean Dolores, who taught Mahony, attended the reunion, recalling that in those days, she taught 75 eighth graders in one class. The school had 900 students in the years following World War II, making it the largest parochial school west of the Mississippi. Mahony recalled Dolores as a strict disciplinarian and as a mentor. She came to Fresno when Mahony was appointed a bishop in 1975 and was in Los Angeles in 1985 when he was named archbishop. She also traveled to Rome to be with Mahony when he became a cardinal. Dolores described the parish as "like a ripple in a pond" -- "It just keeps going and going. That's what life is all about."

=== Hollywood connections ===
Many celebrities have lived in the Toluca Lake, North Hollywood, and Studio City communities served by St. Charles Borromeo.

St. Charles Borromeo was the home parish of Bob Hope, who lived a short distance from the church on Moorpark. In 1969, Bing Crosby, Loretta Young, Ed Sullivan, Ronald Reagan, Danny Kaye, Gregory Peck, Jack Benny, Danny Thomas, Dorothy Lamour and Spiro Agnew attended the wedding of Bob Hope's daughter, Linda, at St. Charles. In July 2003, Bob Hope died at age 100. His funeral at St. Charles was a small, private affair, followed later by a public memorial attended by numerous celebrities, including President Gerald R. Ford, Betty Ford, Nancy Reagan, Sen. Dianne Feinstein, former California governor Pete Wilson, retired Gen. William Westmoreland, Richard Myers, chairman of the Joint Chiefs of Staff, Lee Iacocca, Mickey Rooney, Phyllis Diller, Raquel Welch, Sid Caesar, Kelsey Grammer, Tom Selleck, Ed McMahon, Barbara Eden, Loni Anderson, Shecky Greene, Jack Carter, Connie Stevens, Joey Heatherton, and fellow golfers Jack Nicklaus and Arnold Palmer. The memorial Mass for Hope was given by Cardinal Roger Mahony.

Television actress Tracey Gold, who starred in ABC's Growing Pains, was married at St. Charles in October 1994. Her TV parents, Alan Thicke and Joanna Kerns, attended the ceremony.

The funeral for Bob Hope's friend and co-star, Dorothy Lamour, was also held at St. Charles, in September 1996. On April 19, 2002, the church was the site of the memorial service for actor Robert Urich, best known to TV viewers as private eye Dan Tana on the TV show Vega$. Celebrities in attendance at the service included Tom Selleck, Tony Danza, Love Boat captain Gavin MacLeod and Olympian Caitlyn Jenner (then Bruce). (Note: Jenner changed her name due to gender transition in 2015.) Other celebrities who have been members at St. Charles include Ann Blyth ("Mildred Pierce") actor Erik Estrada (Ponch on TV's CHiPS), Jeopardy! quizmaster Alex Trebek, Wheel of Fortune announcer Charlie O'Donnell, Frankie Avalon, Bob Gunton (Warden Norton in The Shawshank Redemption), Los Angeles district attorney Steve Cooley, actresses Angela Cartwright and Veronica Cartwright and KABC news anchors Laura Diaz and Harold Greene. Also a member was Austrian-American producer and singer Elfi von Dassanowsky, whose memorial service was held at the church on October 9, 2007, with many representatives of the Austrian community in Los Angeles attending.

== See also ==
- San Fernando Pastoral Region
