= Usher's Island =

Usher's Island may refer to:

- Usher's Island (Dublin), an area located around the Dublin quays
- Usher's Island (band), an Irish folk group formed in 2015
