= Jayme Stone =

Canadian banjoist, composer and producer

Jayme Stone is a Canadian banjoist, composer and producer who makes music inspired by sounds from around the world. His solo album The Utmost won the 2008 Juno Award for Instrumental Album of the Year.

Stone has studied with Béla Fleck's teacher, Tony Trischka, among others.

Stone traveled to Mali in 2007 to learn about the banjo's African roots.

== Discography ==
- 2007: The Utmost
- 2008: Africa to Appalachia (with Mansa Sissoko)
- 2010: Room of Wonders
- 2013: The Other Side of the Air
- 2015: Jayme Stone's Lomax Project (collaborative project with Tim O'Brien, Bruce Molsky, Margaret Glaspy, Moira Smiley, Brittany Haas, Julian Lage and others)
- 2017: Jayme Stone's Folklife
- 2020: AWake

== Awards ==
- 2008 Juno Award for The Utmost
- 2009 Juno Award for Africa to Appalachia
- 2009 Canadian Folk Music Award for Africa to Appalachia
- 2011 Canadian Folk Music Award for Room of Wonders
- 2014 Canadian Folk Music Award for The Other Side of the Air

== Producing ==
- 2010 Grant Gordy—Grant Gordy
- 2011 Kyle James Hauser—Oh Oh
- 2011 Jake Schepps—An Evening in the Village: The Music of Béla Bartok
- 2013 Kyle James Hauser—You A Thousand Times
- 2015 John Bullard—The Perfect Southern Art
- 2016 Carrie Newcomer—The Beautiful Not Yet
- 2019 Sumaia Jackson—Möbius:Trip
