= Dorothy Chandler Pavilion =

Opera house in California, United States

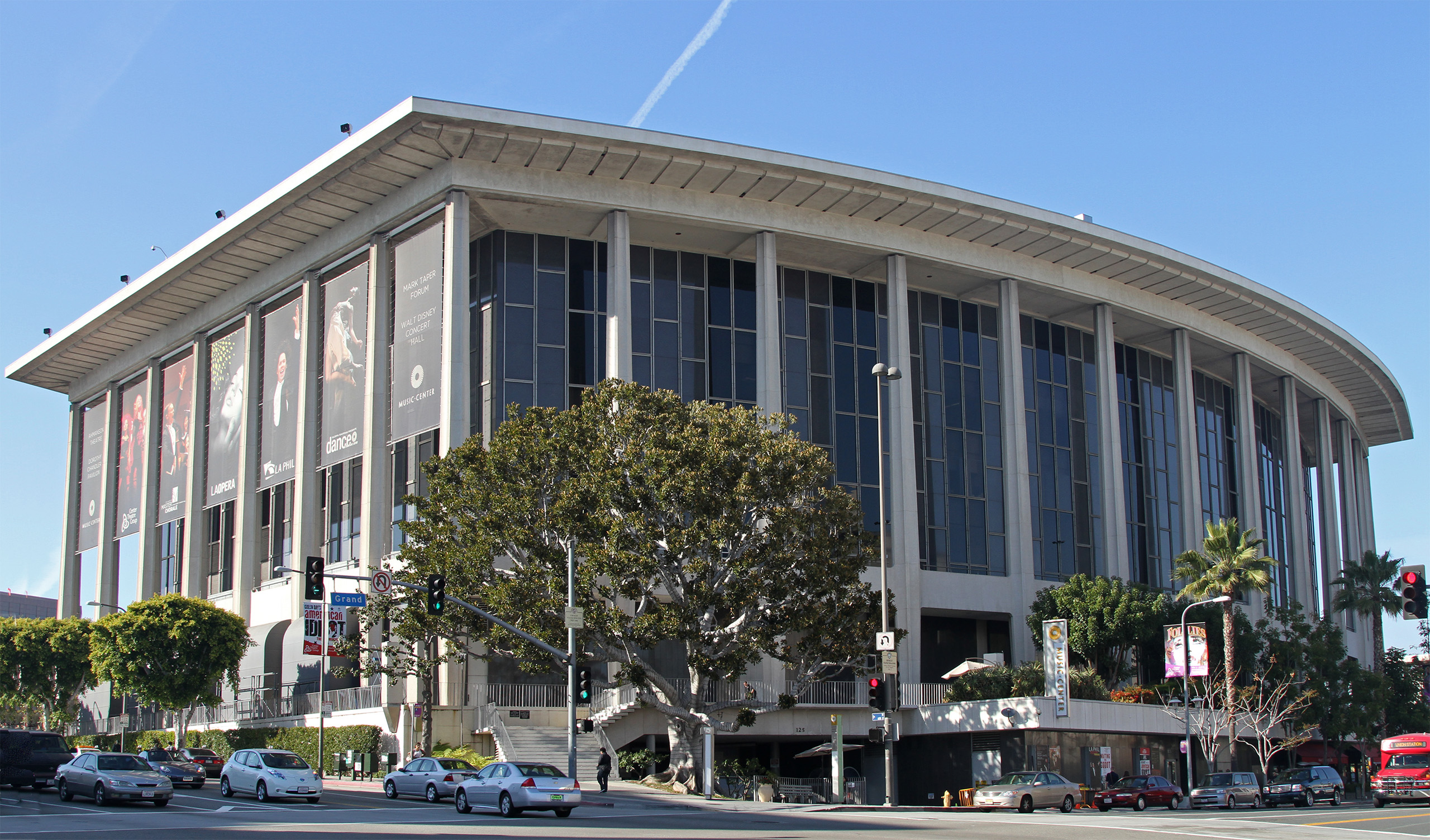

- Location within the Los Angeles metropolitan area Location within California Location within the United States
- Location: 135 North Grand Avenue; Los Angeles, California
- Coordinates: 34°3′23″N 118°14′55″W
- Owner: Los Angeles Music Center
- Seating type: Reserved
- Capacity: 3,156
- Type: Performing arts center
- Public transit: Civic Ctr; Grand Av

Construction
- Built: 1962–1964
- Opened: September 27, 1964
- Architect: Welton Becket & Associates
- Main contractor: Peter Kiewit & Sons

Tenants
- Los Angeles Opera; Glorya Kaufman Presents Dance at The Music Center

Website
- Official website

The Dorothy Chandler Pavilion is one of the halls in the Los Angeles Music Center, which is one of the largest performing arts centers in the United States. The Music Center's other halls include the Mark Taper Forum, Ahmanson Theatre, and Walt Disney Concert Hall.

Since the Los Angeles Philharmonic Orchestra and Los Angeles Master Chorale have moved to the newly constructed and adjacent Disney Hall which opened in October 2003, the Pavilion is home of the Los Angeles Opera and Glorya Kaufman Presents Dance at the Music Center.

The Academy of Motion Picture Arts and Sciences held its annual Academy Awards in the Dorothy Chandler Pavilion from 1969 to 1987, 1990, 1992 to 1994, 1996, and 1999.

== History ==
The Pavilion has 3,156 seats spread over four tiers, with chandeliers, wide curving stairways and rich décor. The auditorium's sections are the Orchestra (divided in Premiere Orchestra, Center Orchestra, Main Orchestra and Orchestra Ring), Circle (divided in Grand Circle and Founders Circle), Loge (divided in Front Loge and Rear Loge), as well as Balcony (divided in Front Balcony and Rear Balcony).

Construction started on March 9, 1962, and it was dedicated September 27, 1964. The Pavilion was named for Dorothy Buffum Chandler who

led [the] effort to build a suitable home for the Los Angeles Philharmonic and rejuvenate the performing arts in Los Angeles. The result was Mrs. Chandler’s crowning achievement, the Music Center of Los Angeles County. Her tenacious nine-year campaign on behalf of the Music Center produced more than $19 million in private donations

noted Albert Greenstein in 1999. The building was designed by architect Welton Becket. The project was an example of his firm's approach of total design, in which he managed all aspects including design, construction, fixtures, and interior finishes to achieve a coherent whole. Peter Kiewit & Sons (now Kiewit Corporation) was the builder.

In order to receive approval for construction from the Los Angeles County Board of Supervisors, Chandler promised Kenneth Hahn that the building would be open free for the public for one day a year. The result was the Los Angeles County Holiday Celebration, a Christmas Eve tradition sponsored by the Board of Supervisors. The program is broadcast on PBS SoCal and an edited version of the prior year's show is syndicated to public television stations via PBS.

The opening concert was held on December 6, 1964, with Zubin Mehta conducting the Los Angeles Philharmonic with soloist Jascha Heifetz. The program included Fanfare by Richard Strauss, American Festival Overture by William Schuman, Roman Festivals by Ottorino Respighi, and Beethoven's Violin Concerto.

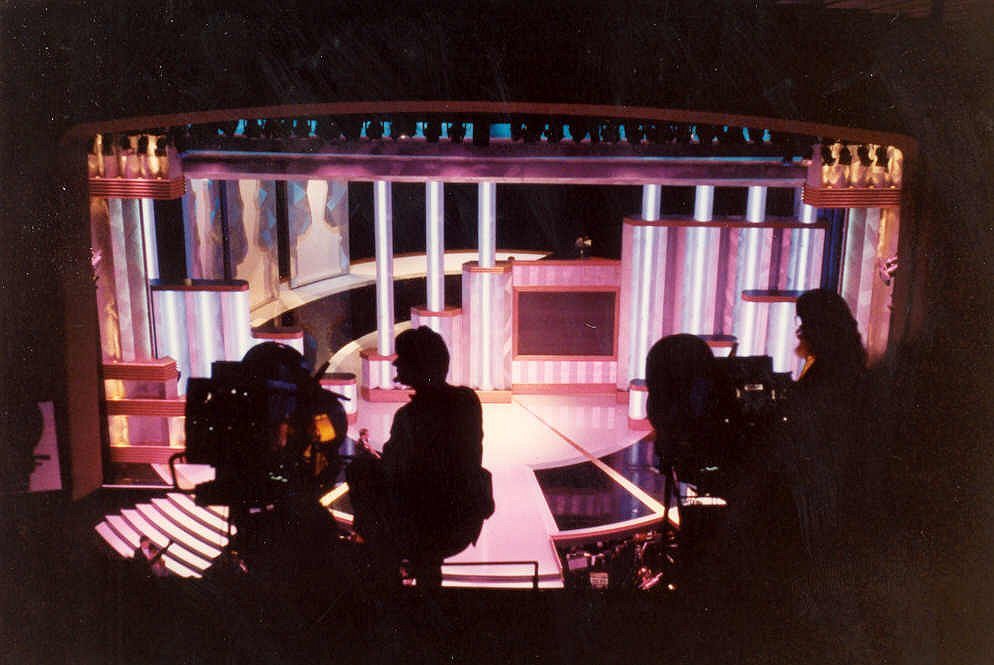
The stage as seen from the balcony at the 62nd Academy Awards in 1990.

The Los Angeles Master Chorale, under Music Director Roger Wagner, was the other founding resident company at the Pavilion. Before creation of the Los Angeles Opera company, the New York City Opera came regularly on tour and performed in the Pavilion. One such tour, in 1967, consisted of two performances of Madama Butterfly, one of La Traviata, and two of Ginastera's Don Rodrigo, each with Plácido Domingo singing the main tenor role.

On December 16, 1970, the hall hosted the monumental 12-hour Beethoven Marathon for Beethoven's 200th birthday celebration. Admission was $1 and the finale running well past midnight was the 4th movement of Beethoven's 9th Symphony performed by the Los Angeles Philharmonic conducted by Zubin Mehta.

The hall's acoustics were controversial during the period the Los Angeles Philharmonic made the pavilion its home. Problems varied depending on the listening location, with the orchestra sounding too loud in some places and too muffled in others. However, it was lauded for its remarkable sense of intimacy given its 3,000 seats, allowing the orchestra to dramatically project and emote without sounding too bright or brash. Abe Meltzer, chief consulting acoustician, stated in 1986 that the basic issue was that the Pavilion was a multi-purpose room, rather than one tailored to orchestral concerts.

== Annual Holiday Celebration ==
Since 1964, a Christmas Eve tradition for the Dorothy Chandler Pavilion is the annual free Holiday Celebration funded by Los Angeles County. It used to be six hours (from 3 pm to 9 pm) of music and dance by groups from all around Los Angeles county, However, due to financial cuts in the county budgets, the celebration was cut in half to three hours, limiting the performers to no more than two or three musical numbers each. Also, because of the overcrowds, the audience members have to arrive three hours earlier, where they have to wear colored wristbands in order to gain admission. The performances now last from 3PM to 6PM Pacific Time, without any intermissions. The performances are also broadcast on the PBS SoCal public television station with a one-hour version broadcast on PBS since 2002.

== In popular culture ==
The Dorothy Chandler Pavilion is featured in the 2008 video game Midnight Club: Los Angeles.

The Pavilion is seen in the Star Trek: Voyager Episode "Future's End, Part 2"(Season 3 Episode 9).

The site was used as the location for an avant-garde perfume ad directed by Spike Jonze.

Nick Hexum, the lead singer of the alt rock band 311, was briefly a waiter at this venue, as referenced in the lyrics of their song "Applied Science".

== See also ==
- List of opera houses
- Bridges Auditorium
- Shrine Auditorium
