= John Doyle (guitarist) =

Irish musician (born 1971)

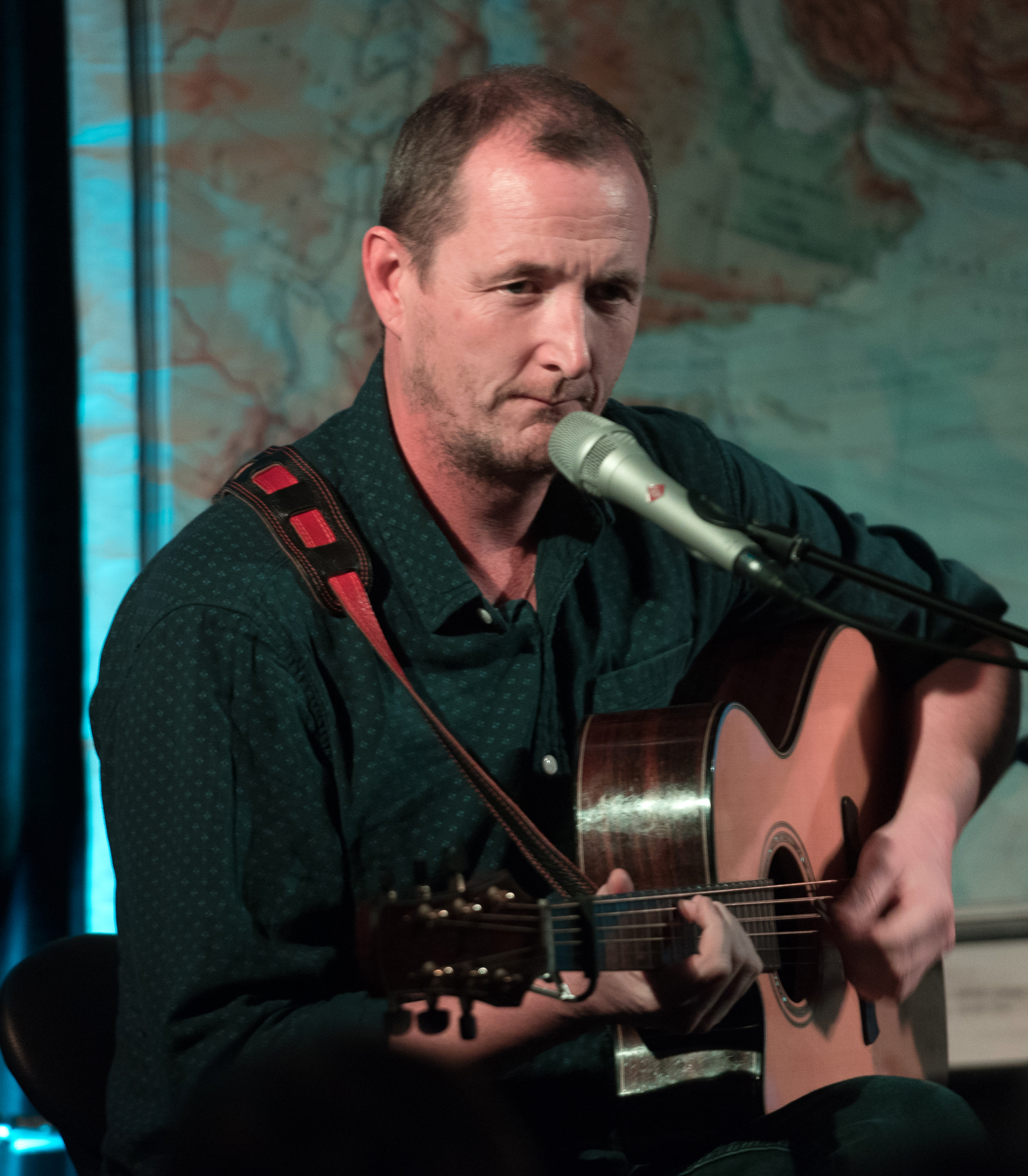
- Doyle in 2018

Background information
- Born: 1971 (age 54–55); Dublin, Ireland
- Instruments: Guitar; bouzouki; vocals

John Doyle (born 1971) is an Irish guitarist and singer, known for his work with Solas and Usher's Island, as well as for his collaborations with many traditional Irish musicians (Including Liz Carroll, Michael McGoldrick, John McCusker, Andy Irvine, and Eileen Ivers) stints touring with Joan Baez and Mary Chapin Carpenter, and for his solo work.

Born in Dublin, he immigrated to the U.S. in 1991. He lives in Asheville, North Carolina.

== Discography ==
Solo

- 2001 — Evening Comes Early (Shanachie)
- 2005 — Wayward Son (Compass Records)
- 2011 — Shadow and Light
- 2020 — Path of Stones

With solas

- 1996 — Solas
- 1997 — Sunny Spells and Scattered Showers
- 1998 — The Words That Remain
- 2000 — The Hour Before Dawn
- 2003 — Another Day
- 2005 — Waiting for an Echo
- 2006 — Reunion: A Decade of Solas
- 2008 — For Love and Laughter
- 2010 — The Turning Tide
- 2013 — Shamrock City
- 2016 — All These Years

Collaborations

- Usher's Island (Vertical Records, 2017)

w. Liz Carroll

- 2005 — In Play (Compass Records)
- 2009 — Double Play (Compass Records)

w. Mike McGoldrick & John McCusker

- 2012 — Live
- 2017 — The Wishing Tree
- 2020 — The Reed that Bends in the Storm
- 2021 — At Home this Spring
- 2024 — "The Best Of"

w. Karan Casey

- 2010 — Exiles Return (Compass Records)

w. Mick Moloney

- 2002 - Far From the Shamrock Shore (Shanachie) [Doyle plays on all tracks except track 9]
