= Moira Smiley =

American singer, composer, lyricist and musician (born 1976)

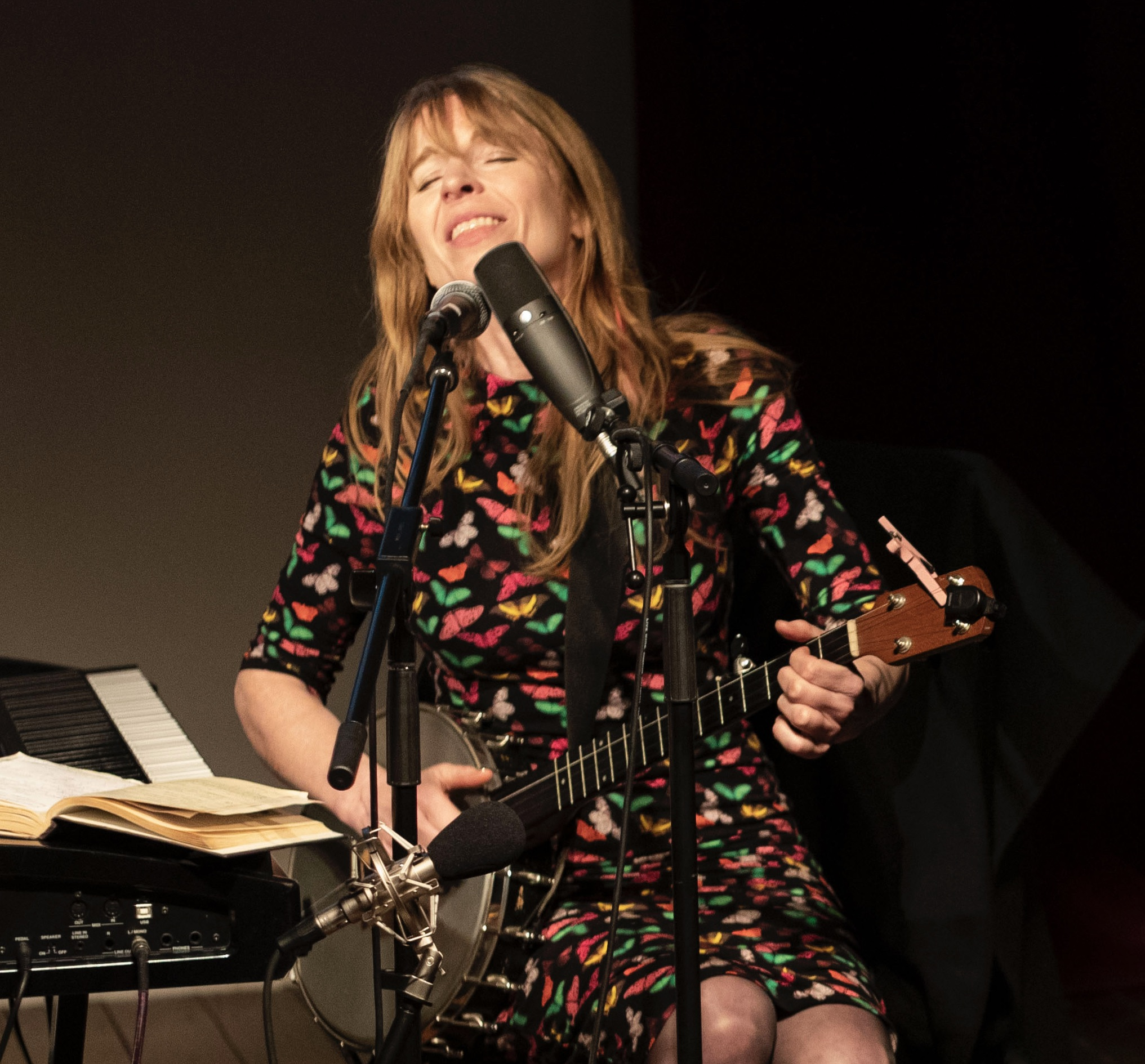
Moira Smiley performing at Celtic Christmas with Seamus Egan Project

Moira Gwendolyn Smiley (born 21 May 1976) is an American singer, composer, lyricist and musician born in New Haven, Vermont. She is a multi-instrumentalist on banjo, accordion, piano, and body percussion. Smiley's music has been influenced by folk styles, shape-note singing, classical song, and jazz. Smiley has performed and collaborated with various artists including Billy Childs, Solas, Jayme Stone's The Lomax Project, choral composer Eric Whitacre, Los Angeles Master Chorale, New World Symphony, and often tours with eclectic indie-pop group Tune-Yards.

== Early life and education ==
Smiley grew up in rural New Haven, Vermont. As a teenager, she began teaching at the Village Harmony Summer Camps. Smiley was among the 9 composers from Village Harmony that were represented on the Endless Light recording in 1996. She entered Indiana University's Jacobs School of Music in 1994 as a Wells Scholar to study piano performance, and earned her degree in Early Music Vocal Performance. After college she traveled and studied the folk music and multi-part harmonies of Eastern Europe (Croatia, Bosnia, Serbia, Bulgaria) as well as the traditional Irish Sean Nós singing.

== Career ==
While at Indiana University she founded the vocal quartet VIDA, which won Bloomington Voice's Battle of the Bands contest. They went on to perform across the U.S. and Europe as part of the IMG Artists roster. She also began performing and recording with early music ensembles such as Paul Hillier's Theater of Voices, Sinfonye, The Dufay Collective and Fretwork Consort of Viols as well as with American composer, Malcolm Dalglish.

In 2005 she released her first solo album Rua. The following year she released Blink, her first album with her vocal group VOCO. In 2013 Smiley and her group VOCO performed "Music for a Three-Layer Brain" for the TEDxCaltech "The Brain" event. In 2018 she began collaborating with the Seamus Egan Project, performing vocals and accordion. She sang "Days of War", her song written with Séamus Egan for a concert on Front Row Boston. In 2018 she released her second solo album, Unzip the Horizon, which The Bluegrass Situation called "the work of a significant talent finding new possibilities in her voice." In 2018 and 2019, Smiley led an immersive a cappella experience with the Los Angeles Master Chorale at the Walt Disney Concert Hall's BIG SING California event. In February, 2021 she released the vocal album, In Our Voices.

== Awards ==
In 2002, Smiley won the Barbara Thornton Memorial Scholarship for Medieval Music, given by the Sequentia Ensemble.

In 2007, Smiley (along with fellow composers Ron Bartlett, Charlie Campagna) won the annual Lester Horton Award for "Music for Dance" for a score commissioned by choreographers Regina Klenjoski and Monica Favand for Klenjoski's The Black Drim, which was subsequently performed by Smiley & VOCO (along with the TRIP Music Ensemble) for the Synergy concert at the John Anson Ford Amphitheatre, in LA.

In 2007, her ensemble Moira Smiley & VOCO were named national champions of the 30+ year old Harmony Sweepstakes A Cappella Festival.

== Discography ==
=== Solo albums ===
- The Rhizome Project (2024)
- Unzip The Horizon (2018)
- Rua (2005)

=== Singles ===
- Meeting Is Over (featuring Piers Faccini & Seamus Egan)
- Oh, Watch The Stars (with Seamus Egan & Kaïa Kater)
- Sing About It (Naytronix Remix)
- Mourning Dove (featuring Seamus Egan)

=== With VOCO ===
- In Our Voices (2021)
- Laughter Out of Tears (2014)
- Small Worlds (2009)
- Circle, Square, Diamond and Flag (2008)
- Blink (2006)

=== With VIDA ===
- Blue Album (2000)
- In Bloom(1999)
- Vida (1997)

=== Soundtracks ===
- Changing Woman (2002)
- Sacred Ground (2001)

=== Album Collaborations ===
- The Lomax Project [Jayme Stone]
- Folklife Project [Jayme Stone]
- All These Years [Solas]
- Solas Live [Solas]
- Good Winter [Seamus Egan]
