= Roger Wagner =

American choral musician, administrator and educator

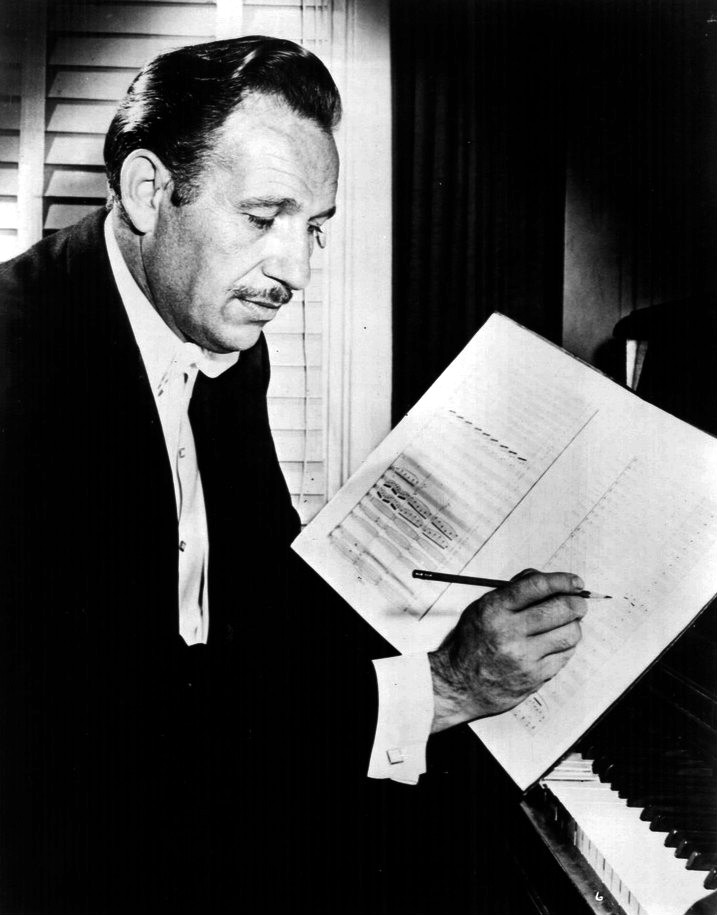
- Wagner in 1964

Background information
- Born: January 16, 1914; Le Puy, France
- Died: September 17, 1992 (aged 78) Dijon, France

Roger Wagner, KCSG (January 16, 1914 – September 17, 1992) was an American choral musician, administrator and educator. In 1946 he founded the Roger Wagner Chorale, which became one of America's premier vocal ensembles. He also founded the Los Angeles Master Chorale, one of the three original resident companies of the Los Angeles Music Center, in 1964.

== Early life ==
Wagner was born in Le Puy, France, on January 16, 1914, and died on September 17, 1992, in Dijon, France. His younger brother was actor and voiceover artist Jack Wagner. Roger Wagner was immersed in music from his youngest years. His father was an organist of the cathedral in Dijon, France and subsequently in Los Angeles, after emigrating to the United States in 1921. At the age of 12, Roger assumed his first musical position in his own right, serving as organist at St. Ambrose Church in West Hollywood.

== Education ==
Wagner returned to France in 1931 to complete his musical studies, earning his degree from the College of Montmorency while studying with Marcel Dupré. He then served in the French army, during which time, he qualified as a member of the French decathlon team for the 1936 Summer Olympics.

== Roger Wagner Chorale ==
In 1937, Wagner joined the MGM chorus in Hollywood and was subsequently appointed music director of St. Joseph's Church in Los Angeles, where he established an outstanding choir of men and boys, including a young Paul Salamunovich. In 1945, Roger Wagner became the supervisor of young choruses for the City of Los Angeles, most notably the "Los Angeles Concert Youth Chorus." It was from a madrigal group of twelve of these singers that the soon world-renowned Roger Wagner Chorale was born in 1946.

In 1964, on completion of the Los Angeles Music Center, Wagner and representatives of the Junior Chamber of Commerce formed a resident choral ensemble, the Los Angeles Master Chorale, which became a resident company of the Music Center alongside the Los Angeles Philharmonic. Credits include performance with Eugene Ormandy and the Philadelphia Orchestra in the Presidential Inaugural at the Kennedy Center in 1973 and a tour of the Soviet Union as a United States State Department "cultural ambassador" in 1974. Wagner served as the chorale's music director for 22 years until he was named music director laureate.

The chorale's 1951 recording of Giovanni Pierluigi da Palestrina's "Pope Marcellus Mass" was selected by the Library of Congress as a 2010 addition to the National Recording Registry, which selects recordings annually that are "culturally, historically, or aesthetically significant".

== Services to education ==
Roger Wagner also made a significant contribution to education and church music serving 32 years on the faculty of UCLA where he continued as professor emeritus until his death. He was also distinguished professor of choral music at Pepperdine University. In addition to his renowned choral work at St. Joseph's Church, Wagner served as music director at St. Charles Borromeo Church (North Hollywood) from 1942 to 1949, succeeded by his protege, Paul Salamunovich, who also eventually succeed him as conductor of the Los Angeles Master Chorale. Wagner founded the Roger Wagner Center for Choral Studies at California State University, Los Angeles.

== Awards ==
Numerous honors and awards were earned by Roger Wagner during his lifetime including a Doctor of Music degree from the University of Montreal on the masses of Josquin des Prez and honorary doctorates from Westminster Choir College in Princeton, New Jersey, and St. Norbert College in De Pere, Wisconsin. For his contribution to sacred music, Pope Paul VI honored Wagner with the title Knight Commander in the Order of St. Gregory, and the Archbishop of Naples presented him with the Order of St. Bridgette. The 1990 Western Division American Choral Directors Association Convention in Fresno, California, was dedicated to Roger Wagner for his outstanding contribution to choral art.

The world's leading conductors and musicians, among them Eugene Ormandy, Leopold Stokowski, Bruno Walter, Otto Klemperer, Serge Koussevitsky, hailed Wagner's incomparable genius in the field of choral music. His vocal arrangements are published by Lawson-Gould and released by Warner Bros.

A large, painted portrait of Wagner hangs in the Dorothy Chandler Pavilion. Roger Wagner also received a star on the Hollywood Walk of Fame, on the north side of the 7000 block of Hollywood Boulevard.

== Wagner's view ==
"Following one of our performances with the Los Angeles Philharmonic Orchestra, a well-known local critic asked me, "What is this hypnotic power you wield over your singers? And why did you form the Chorale?" The first question is indeed flattering; however, just the opposite is true. Singers hypnotize me, especially when they are good. The second question can best be answered, I think, by telling something about the Chorale. Every Monday evening 200 singers converge on the Chorale studios to do one thing...sing.

They sing choral masterworks, large and small, and find the experience good. School teachers, salesmen, housewives, executives, factory workers, students, professional musicians and others from all walks of life and from distances up to a hundred miles, come with one aim of trying to produce fine choral singing. Each has had some musical training, can read music and loves to sing. To them the Chorale is an ideal, as it is to me, and they dedicate themselves to it with an almost unbelievable devotion. Several have changed or even left jobs that continually interfered with rehearsals. This sort of thing naturally calls for whatever best I have to offer. It would be presumptuous of me to assume that these intelligent people make such sacrifices out of deference to me alone. The main attraction I have stated above. But aside from the quality of the music we perform and unceasing drive toward perfection, we work hard, accomplish a good deal but manage to have a little fun along the way. We have many beliefs in common. We believe music should become a living expression of human emotions and creeds. When we rehearse great works we feel we are truly living through a great experience. We are not concerned with political affiliations or social questions; our interests are purely musical. The Chorale is a heterogeneous mixture of races, colors and creeds whose members lose sight of any differences in a common endeavor. And one thing in which we unanimously concur is the right of self-expression and of the dignity of individuals who make sincere efforts to raise choral art to the highest possible level."
