= Solas (group) =

Irish music group

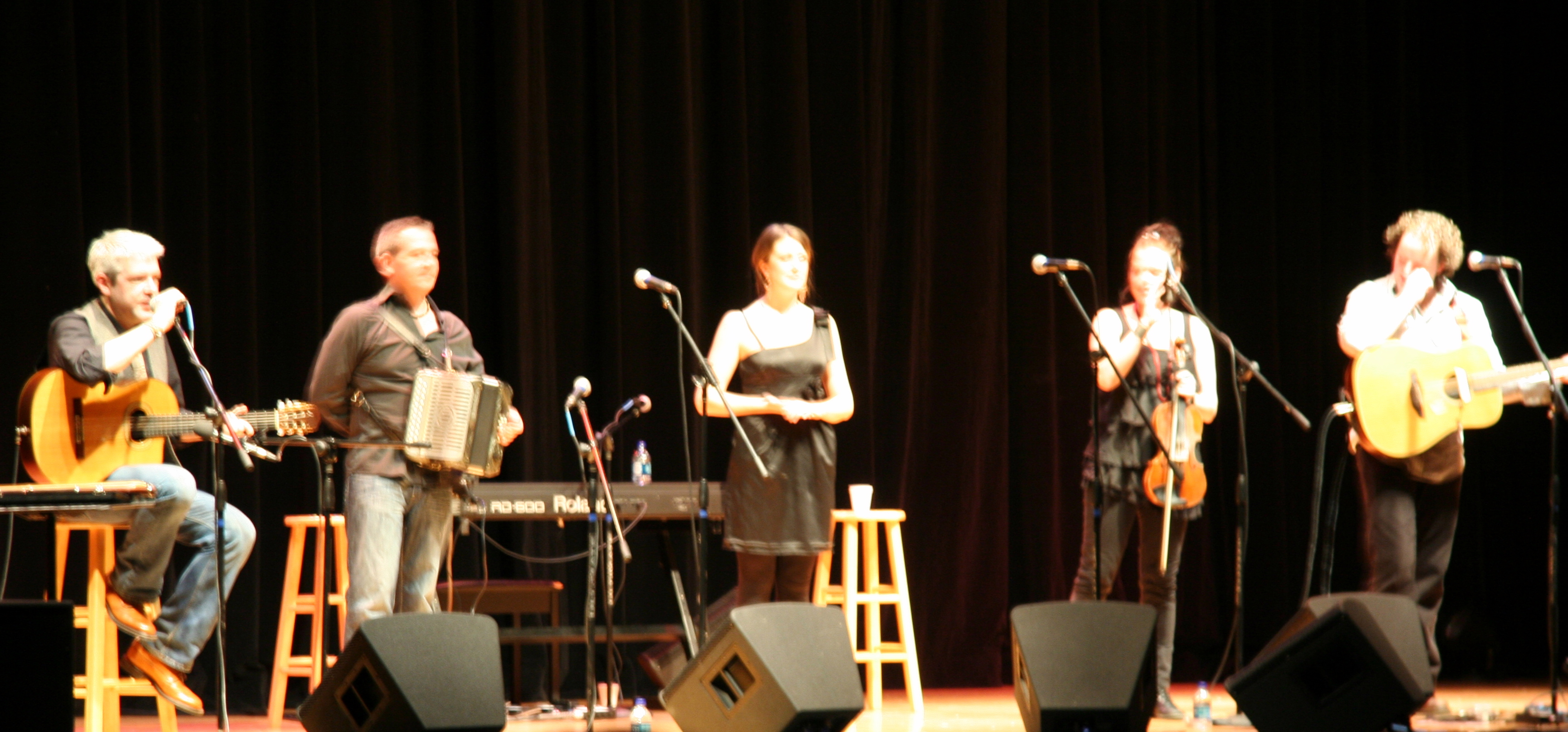
- Solas live in 2010

Background information
- Origin: New York City, New York, United States
- Genres: Folk; Celtic
- Years active: 1996–2016, 2024–current.
- Labels: Compass Records; Shanachie Records
- Members: Séamus Egan; Winifred Horan; John Williams; Nuala Kennedy or Moira Smiley; Alan Murray
- Past members: Karan Casey; John Doyle; Deirdre Scanlan; Donal Clancy; Máiread Phelan; Niamh Varian-Barry; Noriana Kennedy; Mick McAuley; Éamon McElholm; Moira Smiley
- Website: solastheband.com

Solas (Irish: ‘light’) is an American musical group officially formed in 1996, playing Irish traditional music as well as original compositions influenced by the country, rock, and Americana genres. With several members who are prominent performers, both solo and in other constellations in the Irish traditional music scene, Solas has been described as a "Supergroup". Their name comes from an Irish word meaning "light".

Prior to their eponymous debut album's 1996 release, the idea for a band was conceived by multi-instrumentalist Séamus Egan, an Irish champion flautist and multi-instrumentalist who had already recorded two solo albums and a soundtrack to a film (as well as having composed “I Will Remember You”, performed by Canadian singer-songwriter Sarah McLachlan). He was soon joined by his friends, vocalist Karan Casey, from Waterford, and fiddler Winifred Horan, from New York. Guitarist and vocalist John Doyle, previously a member of Susan McKeown & The Chanting House, soon joined the trio, along with Chicago-based accordionist John Williams.

After the release of their self-titled debut album (1996) and Sunny Spells and Scattered Showers (1997), Williams departed the band to focus on solo projects, replaced by accordionist and concertina-player Mick McAuley from County Kilkenny. After completing their third record, The Words That Remain (1998), Karan Casey left Solas to focus on her own solo ventures, with Deirdre Scanlan joining as vocalist for their fourth album, The Hour Before Dawn (2000). Guitarist Donal Clancy (son of Liam Clancy) briefly replaced John Doyle for one album, The Edge of Silence (2002) before the group was joined by Éamon McElholm on guitar.

After eight successful years, Deirdre Scanlan retired from the band in June 2008. Solas then welcomed Máiread Phelan, the featured vocalist on their record For Love and Laughter (2008). Two years later, in September 2010, Niamh Varian-Barry from Cork replaced Phelan as vocalist. Then, on 11 July 2013, Solas announced via Facebook that Varian-Berry was leaving the band, with Noriana Kennedy replacing her. The band announced an indefinite hiatus in early 2017.

That indefinite hiatus ended in July 2024, when it was announced that they would be doing a 30th anniversary tour starting in spring 2025. The current lineup is Nuala Kennedy or Moira Smiley, John Williams, Seamus Egan, Alan Murray and Winifred Horan

== Discography ==
- 1996 — Solas
- 1997 — Sunny Spells and Scattered Showers
- 1998 — The Words That Remain
- 2000 — Solas: Live! (VHS/DVD)—recorded on St. Patrick's Day 1998, live at the Flynn Theater, Burlington, Vermont. Featuring behind-the-scenes interviews and rehearsal footage, this recording also aired on PBS as part of a St. Patrick's Day special in 2000.
- 2000 — The Hour Before Dawn
- 2002 — The Edge of Silence
- 2003 — Another Day
- 2005 — Waiting for an Echo
- 2006 — Reunion: A Decade of Solas
- 2008 — For Love and Laughter
- 2010 — The Turning Tide
- 2013 — Shamrock City
- 2016 — All These Years
