= Usher's Island (band) =

Irish folk band

- Origin: Ireland
- Genre: Irish folk
- Years active: 2015–present day
- Spinoff of: Planxty
- Members: Andy Irvine; Paddy Glackin; Michael McGoldrick; John Doyle
- Past members: Dónal Lunny (Died 2026)
- Website: andyirvine.com

Usher's Island is an Irish folk band featuring Andy Irvine, Dónal Lunny, Paddy Glackin, Michael McGoldrick and John Doyle. Their repertoire consists of Irish traditional songs and tunes (reels, jigs, slip jigs, hornpipes), as well as songs written by Irvine and Doyle, respectively.

== History ==
=== Formation ===
After the final incarnation of Planxty ended in early 2005, Irvine, Lunny, and Liam O'Flynn created a new quartet called LAPD, with the addition of Paddy Glackin. When O'Flynn resigned, McGoldrick and Doyle joined the remaining three members of LAPD to form Usher's Island (a reference to the Dublin quay). Between them, they play the following instruments:

- Andy Irvine: vocals, mandolin, mandola, Irish bouzouki, harmonica, hurdy-gurdy
- Dónal Lunny (2015-2026): vocals, Irish bouzouki, guitars, bodhrán, keyboards
- Paddy Glackin: fiddle
- Michael McGoldrick: Irish flute, tin whistle, low whistle, uilleann pipes, tenor guitar, bodhrán
- John Doyle: vocals, guitar, Irish bouzouki, tenor banjo

=== Touring ===
Following two maiden gigs in Ireland (Letterkenny on 10 January 2015, and Carrick on Shannon on 11 January 2015), Usher's Island launched the group at Celtic Connections in Glasgow on 27 January 2015. Later in the year, they appeared at the Guinness Irish Festival in Sion, Switzerland on 7 August and at the Tønder Festival on 30 August.

In 2016, they played at The Gathering traditional festival in Killarney, on 20 February. In April, they embarked on a short tour of Ireland, starting with a concert during the Imagining Home centenary celebrations at the National Concert Hall in Dublin on 3 April, followed by additional gigs in Belfast, Letterkenny, Galway and Dungarvan. On 20 August 2016, the group performed at the FolkEast festival in Suffolk, England, and at the Irish Festival of Oulu, Finland, on 9 October.

In 2017, Usher's Island played a sold-out concert in Paris on 15 March at the Centre Culturel Irlandais (Irish Cultural Centre) and also performed at the festival D’ici et d’ailleurs, organised by Les Bords de Scènes in Juvisy-sur-Orge the next day. The group then delivered three performances in Kilkenny (17 March), Cork (18 March), and at Vicar Street in Dublin during St Patrick's Festival (19 March).

=== Recording ===
Usher's Island released their debut, eponymous album in March 2017, on the independent label Vertical Records.

== Discography ==
- Usher's Island (Vertical Records, 2017)
