= Paul Salamunovich =

American conductor (1927–2014)

Paul Salamunovich KCSG
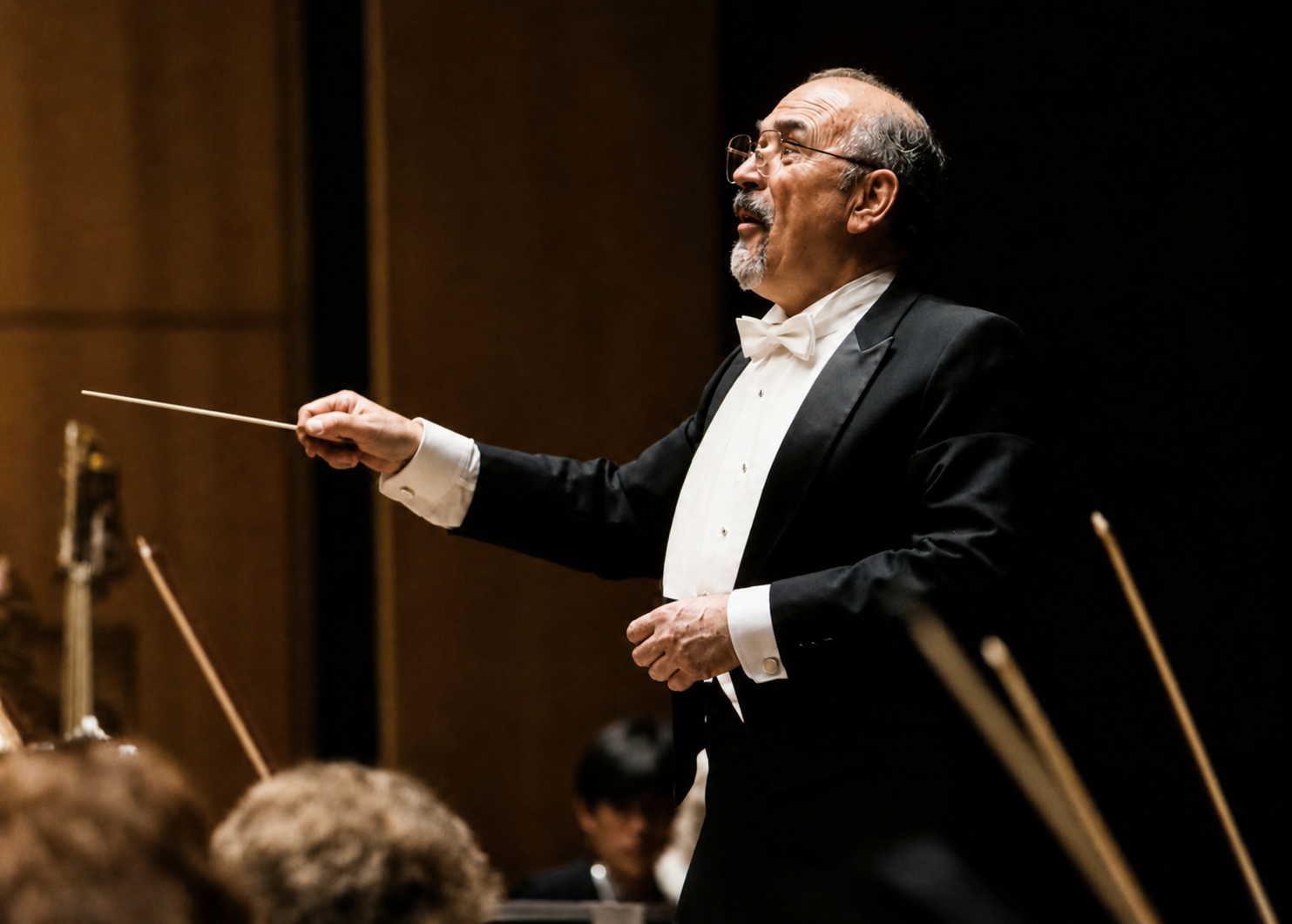
- Paul Salamunovich conducting the Los Angeles Master Chorale and Sinfonia Orchestra at the Dorothy Chandler Pavilion in 1991
- Born: June 7, 1927; Redondo Beach, California, U.S.
- Died: April 3, 2014 (aged 86); Sherman Oaks, California, U.S.
- Occupations: Conductor; educator
- Years active: 1946–2009
- Spouse: Dorothy Hilton (m. 1950)
- Children: 5
- Awards: Pro Ecclesia et Pontifice Order of St. Gregory the Great
- Military career
- Allegiance: United States
- Branch: United States Navy
- Service years: 1945–1946

Paul Salamunovich KCSG (June 7, 1927 – April 3, 2014) was a Grammy-nominated American conductor and educator.

He was the music director of the Los Angeles Master Chorale from 1991 to 2001 and its music director emeritus from 2001 until his death in 2014. He served as director of music at St. Charles Borromeo Church in North Hollywood, California, for 60 years between 1949 and 2009. In addition, he held academic positions at many Southern California universities. He was also a master clinician, having been invited to conduct just under 1000 festivals and workshops worldwide including an unprecedented four consecutive ACDA national conventions—all with different groups.

He was acknowledged as an expert in Gregorian chant and has long been recognized for his contributions in the field of sacred music, most notably receiving a Pro Ecclesia et Pontifice from Pope Benedict XVI in 2013 and was appointed knight commander of the Order of St Gregory the Great from Pope Paul VI in 1969.

== Early life ==
The youngest of five sons born to immigrant parents from what is now Croatia, he was born on June 7, 1927 in Redondo Beach, California, where he attended St. James Elementary School.

Salamunovich recalled a pivotal moment when he was about 8 years old and attended a double feature at the local movie house. At the end of both films, during a MovieTone newsreel, a story about the buildup of tensions in Europe featured eight bars of a cappella music which so captivated him, he sat through both films again for another four hours to hear that same music one more time when the newsreel repeated. It turned out to be the Sancta Maria portion of the Ave Maria by Victoria which became one of his signature conducting pieces throughout his career. When a young priest, Father Louis Buechner, arrived at the parish and started a boy's choir, Salamunovich joined and, as he says, "I was hooked." This choir sang exclusively in Gregorian chant, and "all we did was sing funerals," he said. This early foundation in Gregorian chant, he added, "influenced the music I specialize in, and the techniques I use."

In 1940, at the age of 13, Salamunovich and his family moved to Hollywood, California, where they joined a new church, Blessed Sacrament, and attended its parochial school. The men's and boy's choirs were led by Richard Keys Biggs, the organ teacher of famed choral director Roger Wagner. Despite starting in the boy's choir three years older than was typical, Salamunovich impressed Biggs with his tone and was allowed to join. He remained in the choir after moving to Hollywood High School the following year. At age 14, he began singing with Wagner.

At Hollywood High School, he met Dorothy Hilton, and they became high school sweethearts. (They later married on May 20, 1950, and had five children.)

Upon graduation from high school in 1945, he enlisted in the United States Navy and spent a year in Pearl Harbor, replacing sailors sent home after World War II.

== Career ==
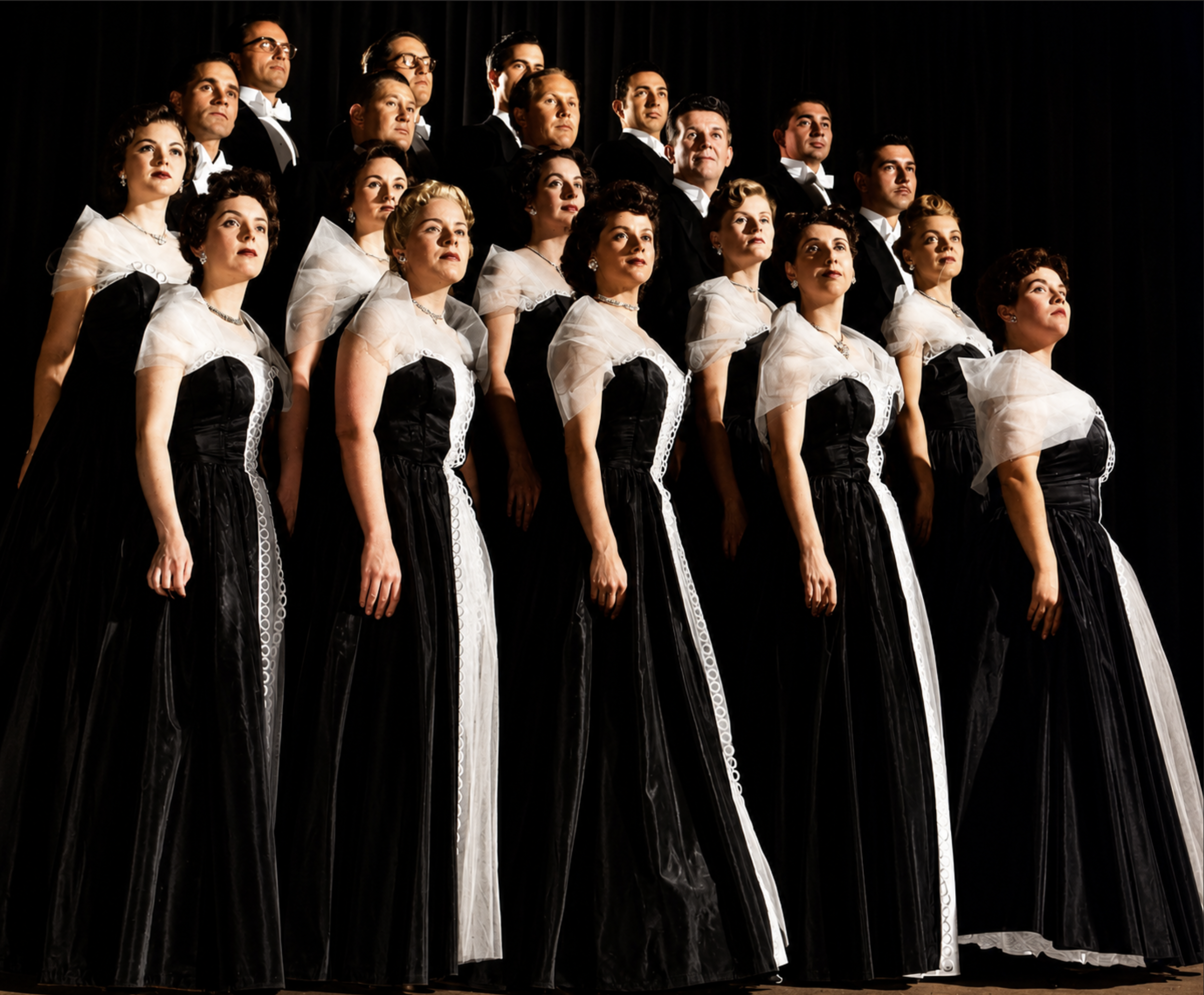
The Roger Wagner Chorale in 1949. Paul Salamunovich is on the far left 2nd from the top, Harve Presnell is two over to the right from Salamunovich, Marilyn Horne is on the far right in the first row and Salli Terri is next to Horne.

After completing his Naval enlistment, Salamunovich returned to Southern California at the age of 19. Hearing of his return, Roger Wagner contacted Salamunovich and asked him to join his newly formed Los Angeles Concert Youth Chorus, whose other members included 13-year-old Marilyn Horne and 14-year-old Marni Nixon; this choir later evolved into the Roger Wagner Chorale in 1948. Wagner eventually suggested that Salamunovich study music in college at Los Angeles City College, where he achieved an associate of arts degree and his classmates included future collaborator Jerry Goldsmith. This led to the beginning of his professional music career. Salamunovich was regularly hired as a professional singer on both live performances and in recordings for such conductors and composers as Arturo Toscanini, Alfred Wallenstein, Igor Stravinsky, and others, singing in all styles of popular and classical music. He sang the tenor solo on César Franck's Panis Angelicus on The Wagner Chorale's album, "The House of the Lord". He was one of the quartet of jazz great Stan Kenton's vocal group, "The Modern Men" who sang on Kenton's album, "Kenton With Voices" in 1957. He was a "ghost singer" along with a semi-regular group of contract singers that included Horne, Nixon, Harve Presnell and Salli Teri singing on multiple film soundtrack recordings between 1946 and 1964, when his increasing conducting duties no longer allowed him the time for studio singing. He soon began contracting and conducting choral segments in films for the next 45 years ending in 2009 after working on 100 film and television productions.

When Wagner was offered a better-paying church job, he decided to install the 21-year-old Salamunovich as choir director at to replace him at St. Charles Borromeo Church in North Hollywood, California in 1949 so that he was free to leave his position there. With great trepidation due to his complete lack of any previous conducting or keyboard experience, Salamunovich reluctantly accepted the position at Wagner's insistence.

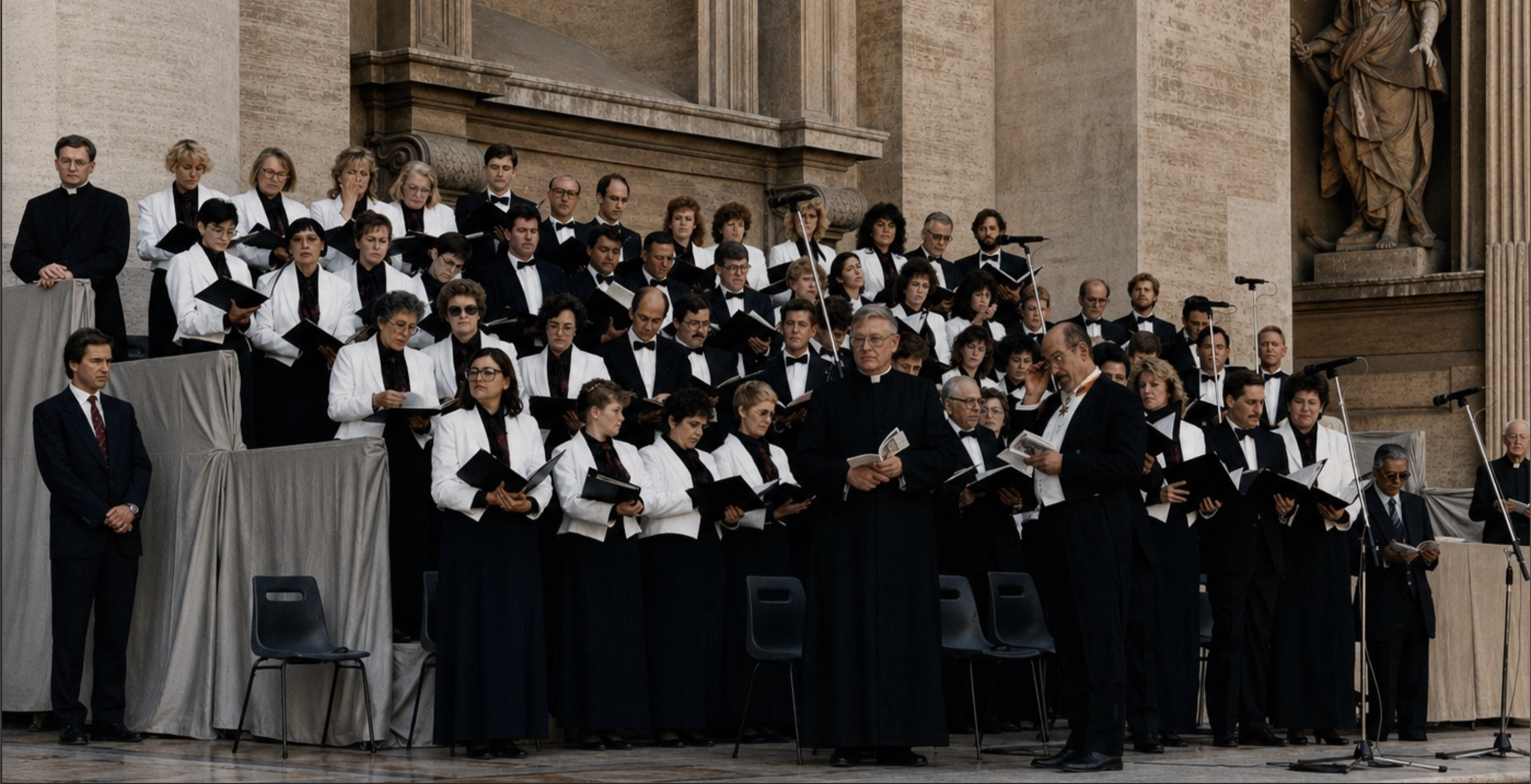
Salamunovich conducts the St. Charles Choir in St. Peter's Square, June 29, 1988

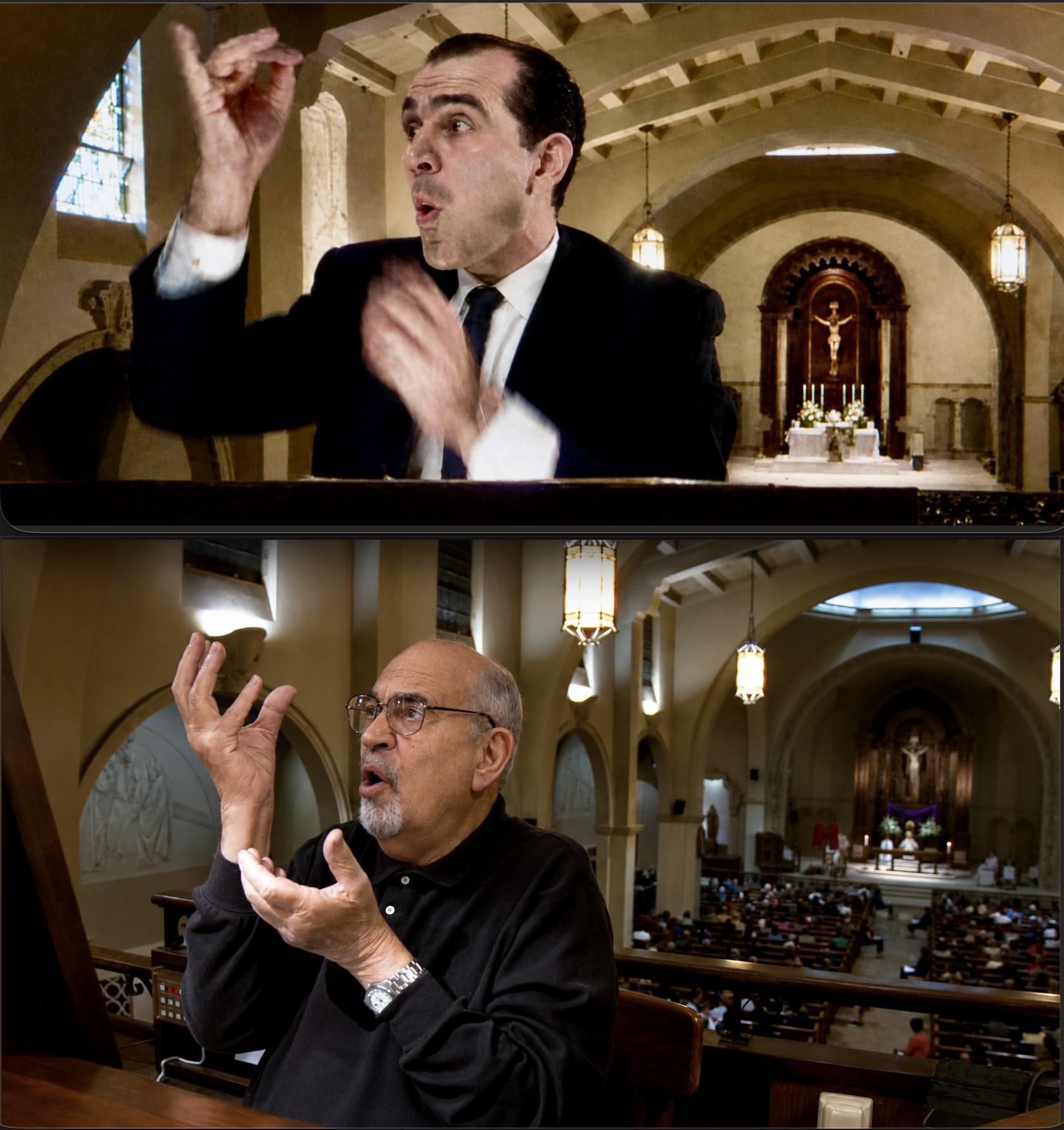
Paul Salamunovich over his 60 years at St. Charles

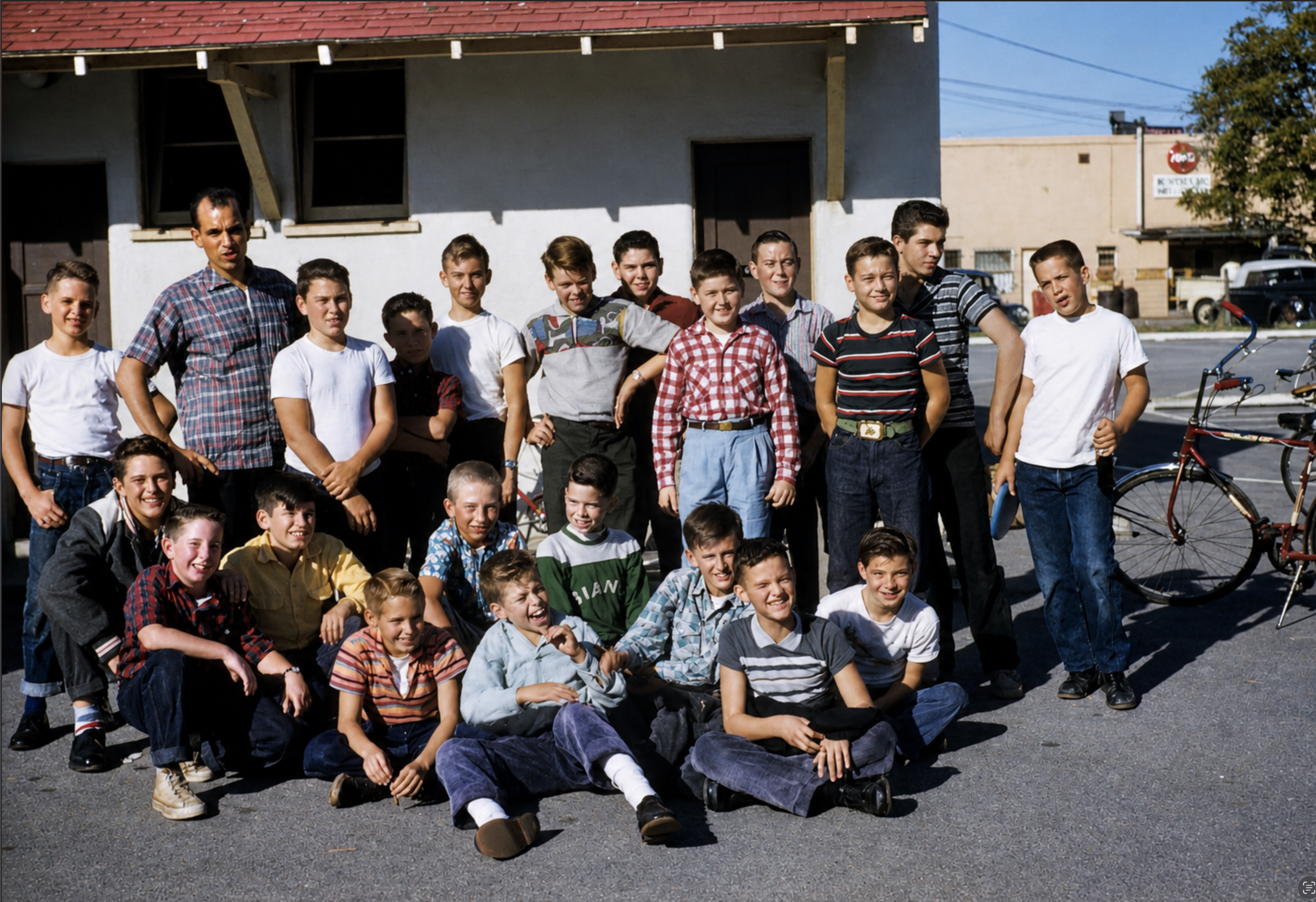
Paul Salamunovich and the St. Charles Boys Choir. Future UCLA football coach Terry Donahue is at the far right and future Chairman of the Joint Chiefs of Staff Admiral Michael Mullen is near the middle in a green and white shirt.

Over the next sixty years, he led the choir in regular services and a number of high-profile performances, including an unprecedented 4 consecutive appearances with 4 different groups at the American Choral Directors Association (ACDA) Biennial National Conventions. Most notably, the St. Charles Borromeo Choir sang for Pope John Paul II in a private audience at the Vatican, for the official Mass of Greeting with John Paul II presiding in St. Vibiana's Cathedral in Los Angeles, and in St. Peter's Square on the Feasts of St. Peter and St. Paul with John Paul II presiding at high Mass. They hold the distinction of being the only American choir to be honored with this invitation. The St. Charles Choir has performed on the soundtracks of the motion pictures "Flatliners", "Grand Canyon" and "True Confessions", for which Salamunovich also coached Robert De Niro on the sung responses of the Latin Mass. The choir also performed on television programs, including The NBC Doc Severinsen Christmas Special, "The Sounds of Christmas" that played for many years on Christmas Eve in place of "The Tonight Show." His St. Charles Boy's Choir served as the Disneyland Boy's Choir on the original "It's A Small World" album. This album was one of 25 recordings designated for landmark preservation status by the Library of Congress in 2022. They also performed with Lucille Ball on The Lucy Show in the 1965 episode "Lucy The Choirmaster" and on the soundtracks of The Godfather in 1971 and the 1964 film Dead Ringer starring Bette Davis. They also performed with the Los Angeles Philharmonic, the San Francisco Opera and the Los Angeles Master Chorale.

Salamunovich was hired to conduct the choirs at Mount St. Mary's college during the late 1950s and while teaching there, received his bachelor's degree in 1961. In 1964, Father Richard Trame, S.J. brought Salamunovich out to then, Loyola University (Los Angeles) to start a choral department from scratch. By the time Salamunovich left there to take over as conductor of the Los Angeles Master Chorale in 1991, he had brought Loyola Marymount University's Choral department to preeminence as one of the nation's leading collegiate choral programs and he regularly conducted major works and premiers there. Salamunovich was honored with an honorary doctorate from LMU and was one of the inaugural inductees into the university's Faculty Hall of Fame.

He served as assistant conductor of the Roger Wagner Chorale from 1953 to 1977. When Wagner formed the Los Angeles Master Chorale, Salamunovich became assistant conductor of the Master Chorale. In this capacity, he led the majority of the Master Chorale's rehearsals, with Wagner stepping in to conduct the performances and some of the dress rehearsals. He also prepared the Master Chorale and other choirs for numerous performances with the Los Angeles Philharmonic, including those conducted by Igor Stravinsky, Bruno Walter, Eugene Ormandy, Georg Solti, Zubin Mehta, Carlo Maria Giulini, Valeri Gergiev, and Simon Rattle, among many others. He served in the capacity until his own conducting invitations precluded his continuing as assistant conductor to Wagner.

When the board of directors of the Master Chorale and Wagner parted ways in 1986, Wagner recommended Salamunovich to replace him; however, Salamunovich declined the board's invitation to submit audition materials, citing extensive prior conducting commitments booked for the next two years at festivals and all-states beyond even his normal academic and liturgical commitments. The board instead hired Scottish conductor John Currie as music director. Currie held the position until the end of the 1991 season; Salamunovich then accepted the Master Chorale's invitation and became its music director in January 1991, effective the fall of that year. "I'm sort of like the prodigal son, come back," Salamunovich said. "My choral heritage is this group."

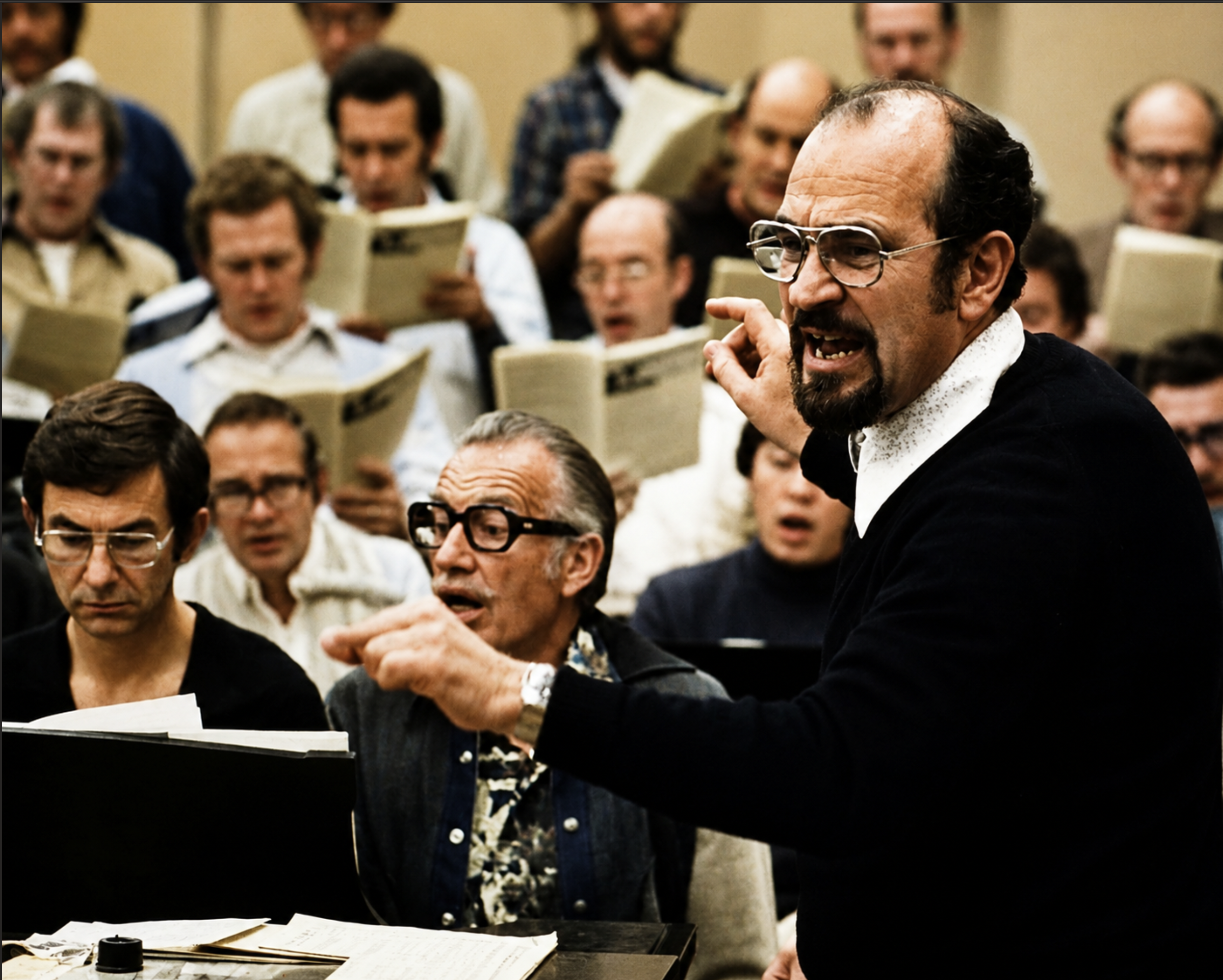
Paul Salamunovich rehearses the Los Angeles Master Chorale as assistant conductor in 1975. Music Director Roger Wagner is seated at the piano on the right.

Once he took over the Master Chorale, Salamunovich set out to restore the signature sound that existed for many years before Currie's tenure. As many insiders already knew, Salamunovich was significantly responsible for that sound, having led the chorale in the vast majority of their rehearsals as assistant conductor until his departure in 1977. "I expect to take back your tone about 25 years," Salamunovich told his singers at his first rehearsal as music director. "The choir has been top-heavy, very top-heavy. I want to get back to a pyramid blend, to the sound of an over-tone choir."

In later interviews with the Los Angeles Times, his approach was described as follows:

'"The smooth line of Gregorian chant is the goal," Salamunovich says. So is "looseness": releasing the muscles as if "throwing up." Articulation and audience comprehension too are ongoing themes. Not just diction but the quality of sound should convey meaning, the conductor maintains. "The foundation is built on the male voices. . . . I don't allow the sopranos to override them. I take the growl out of the basses and the ping out of the tenors. It's a kinder, gentler tone that says 'I love you.'"

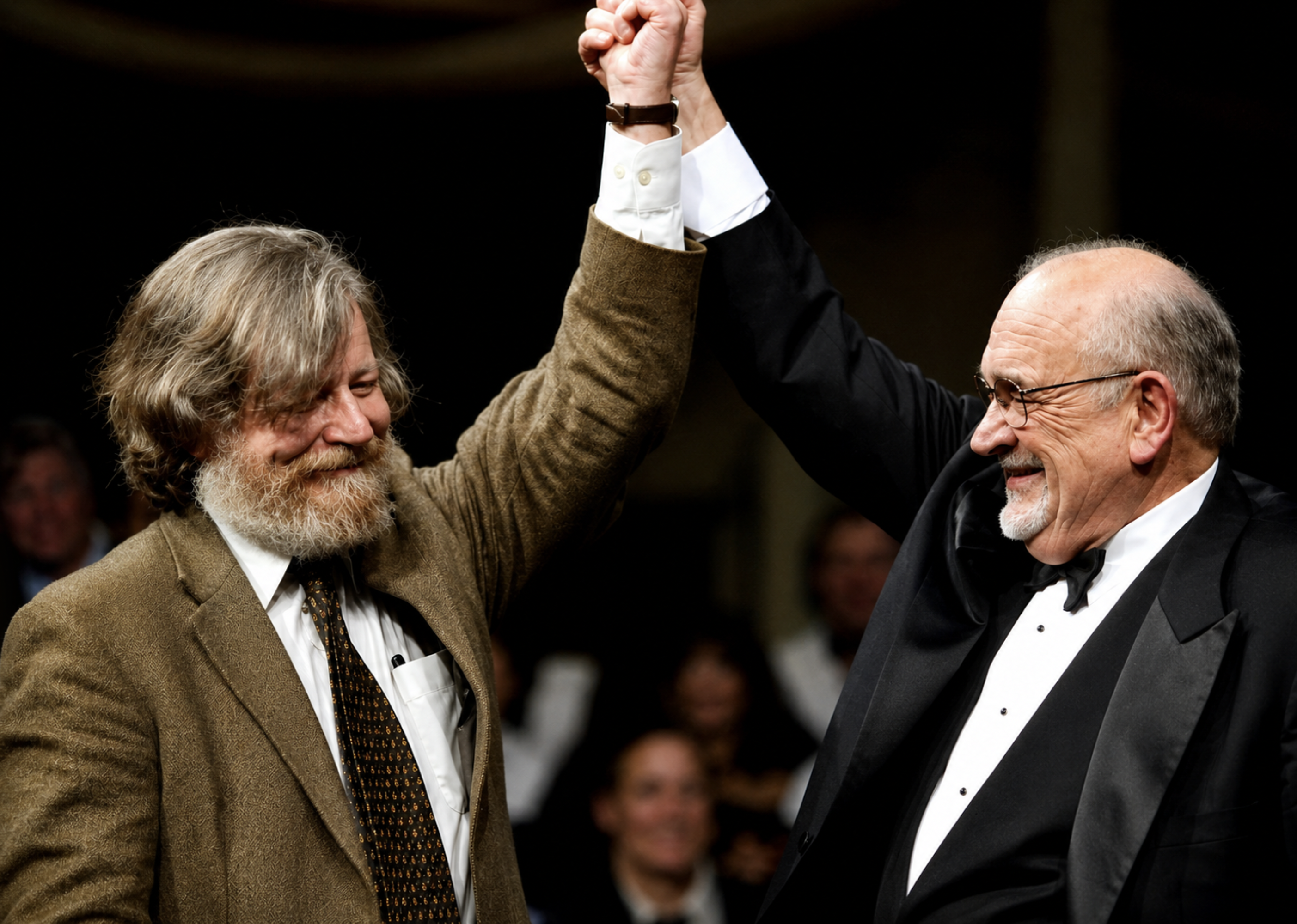
Morten Lauridsen and Paul Salamunovich

Salamunovich led the Los Angeles Master Chorale and Sinfonia Orchestra for ten years, during which time he selected a broad range of repertoire, from Renaissance pieces by 16th-century composers such as Giovanni Pierluigi da Palestrina and Tomás Luis de Victoria, the Classical and Romantic masterworks of Haydn, Mozart, Beethoven, and Brahms, to modern works, most notably those written by Morten Lauridsen, the Master Chorale's Composer-in-Residence from 1994 through 2001. "There's not a note I've written over these years in which I didn't have Paul and the unique sound he achieves with the Master Chorale in mind," Lauridsen once said. "The way phrases are put together and melody is created—I always write for them." This relationship between conductor and composer resulted in works such as O Magnum Mysterium, Lux Aeterna,written for and dedicated to Salamunovich and the Master Chorale and written for Salamunovich's 70th birthday – Ave Maria.

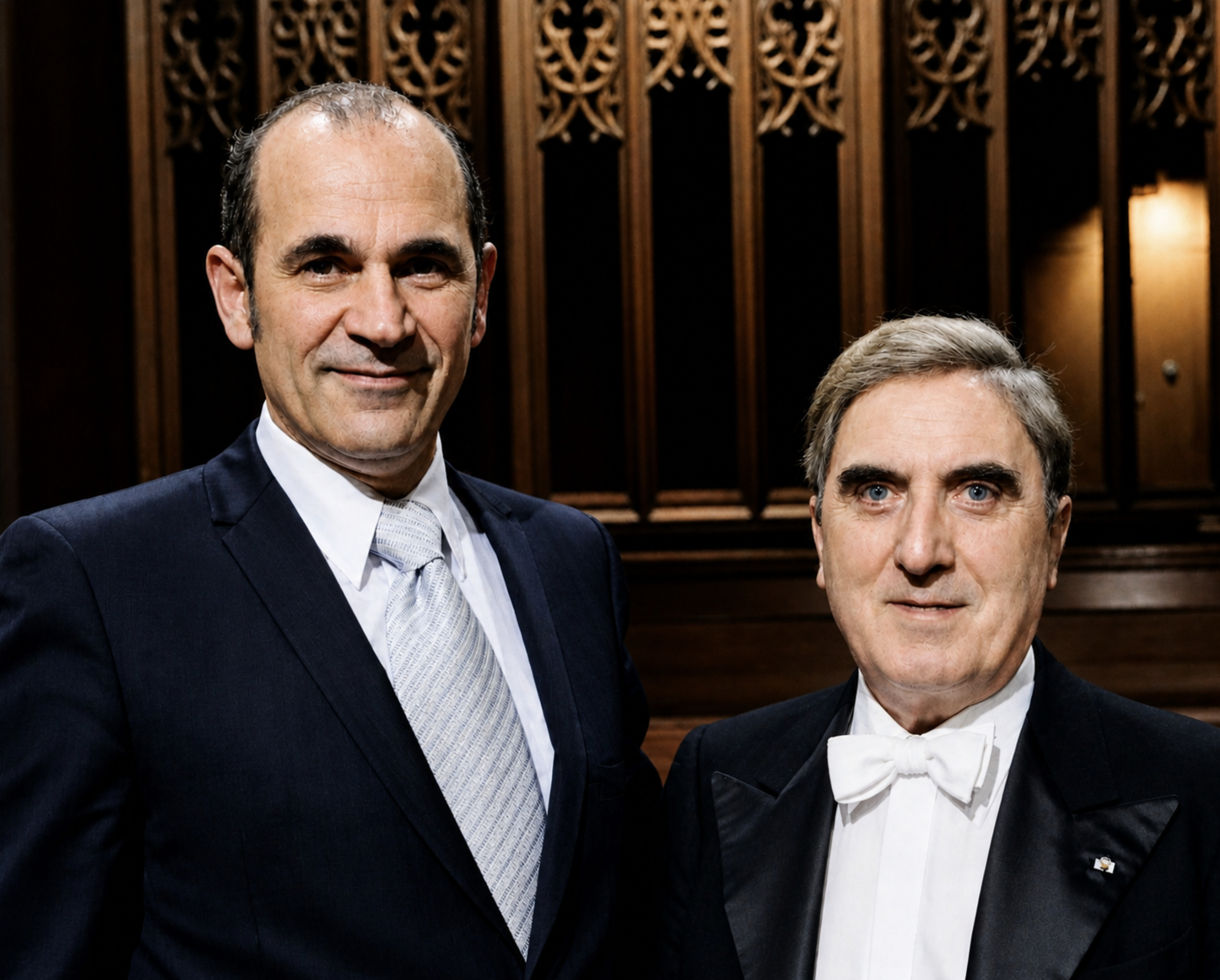
Paul Salamunovich and Maurice Durufle' in November 1971. This same photograph hangs in the composer's curated home in Paris.

Salamunovich was also known for his interpretations of the 20th-century French composer Maurice Duruflé, whose compositions for orchestra and chorus are based upon chant motifs. Salamunovich prepared the St. Charles Choir for a Los Angeles performance of Durufle's Requiem with the composer conducting in November 1971. It was their only meeting, and with Salamunovich speaking no French and Duruflé speaking no English, their communication was left almost entirely to the music. Years later, one of Salamunovich's students toured the composer's home in Paris (now a museum curated by the Duruflé Society) and found a framed photograph of Salamunovich and Duruflé on the wall some 40 years later, commemorating their brief but memorable collaboration.

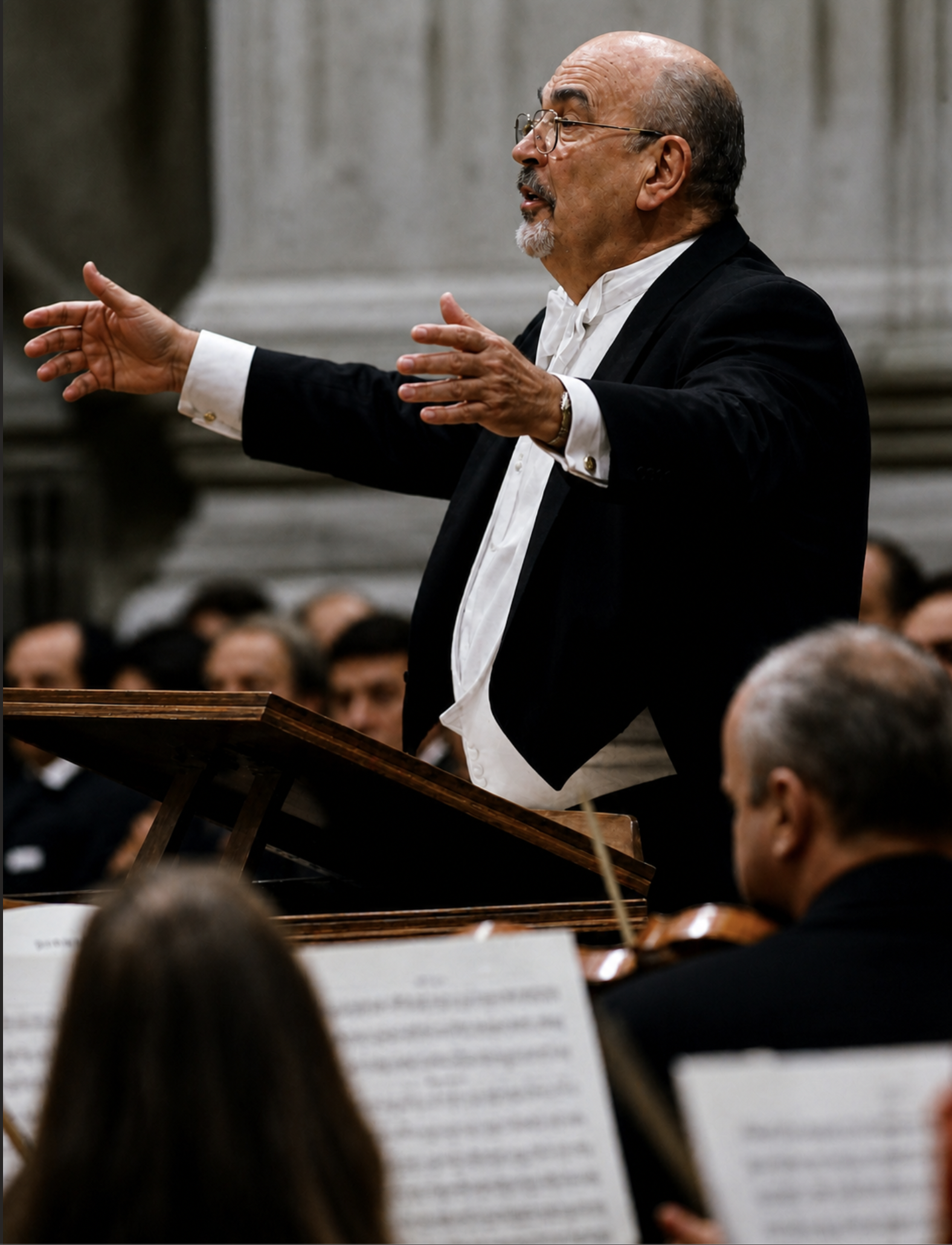
Salamunovich conducts the Saint Petersburg Philharmonic in Rome, Italy 2003

Upon retiring as Music Director of the Los Angeles Master Chorale in 2001, he was immediately named Music Director Emeritus, a title he held until his death. Salamunovich returned to the Chorale as guest conductor in 2005, making his debut in Disney Hall in a sold-out concert. He was one of the most in-demand choral clinicians, having conducted almost 1000 workshops and festivals throughout the United States, Canada, the Bahamas, South America, Europe, Australia, and the Far East. He led the St. Petersburg Philharmonic and the Master Chorale of the United States as part of the annual Festival of Sacred Music at the Basilica of St. John Lateran in Rome in November 2003. In 2012, he was an inaugural inductee to the Loyola Marymount University Faculty Hall of Fame.

=== Academic positions ===
- Mount St. Mary's College: music faculty for 18 years
- Loyola Marymount University: music faculty (1964–1990), Director of Choral Activities, named Professor Emeritus in 1993, inaugural inductee to the Loyola Marymount Faculty Hall of Fame in 2012.
- USC Thornton School of Music: Adjunct Professor of Choral Music, Director of the USC Thornton Chamber Choir (2007–2008)

He also held two honorary doctorates from Loyola Marymount University and the University of St. Thomas (Minnesota). In addition, he taught 831 clinics and workshops throughout the U.S., Canada, South America, the Bahamas, Europe, Australia and the Far East.

=== Papal audiences ===
In addition to his 2003 appearances at the Vatican, Salamunovich led the St. Charles Borromeo choir in three other performances for Pope John Paul II:

- In 1988, they sang at the Mass for the Feast of Saints Peter and Paul with Pope John Paul II presiding in St. Peter's Square in Rome. This was the only American choir ever invited to sing at this occasion.
- In 1987, they performed at the Cathedral of Saint Vibiana for the official welcome of the Pontiff to the City of Los Angeles
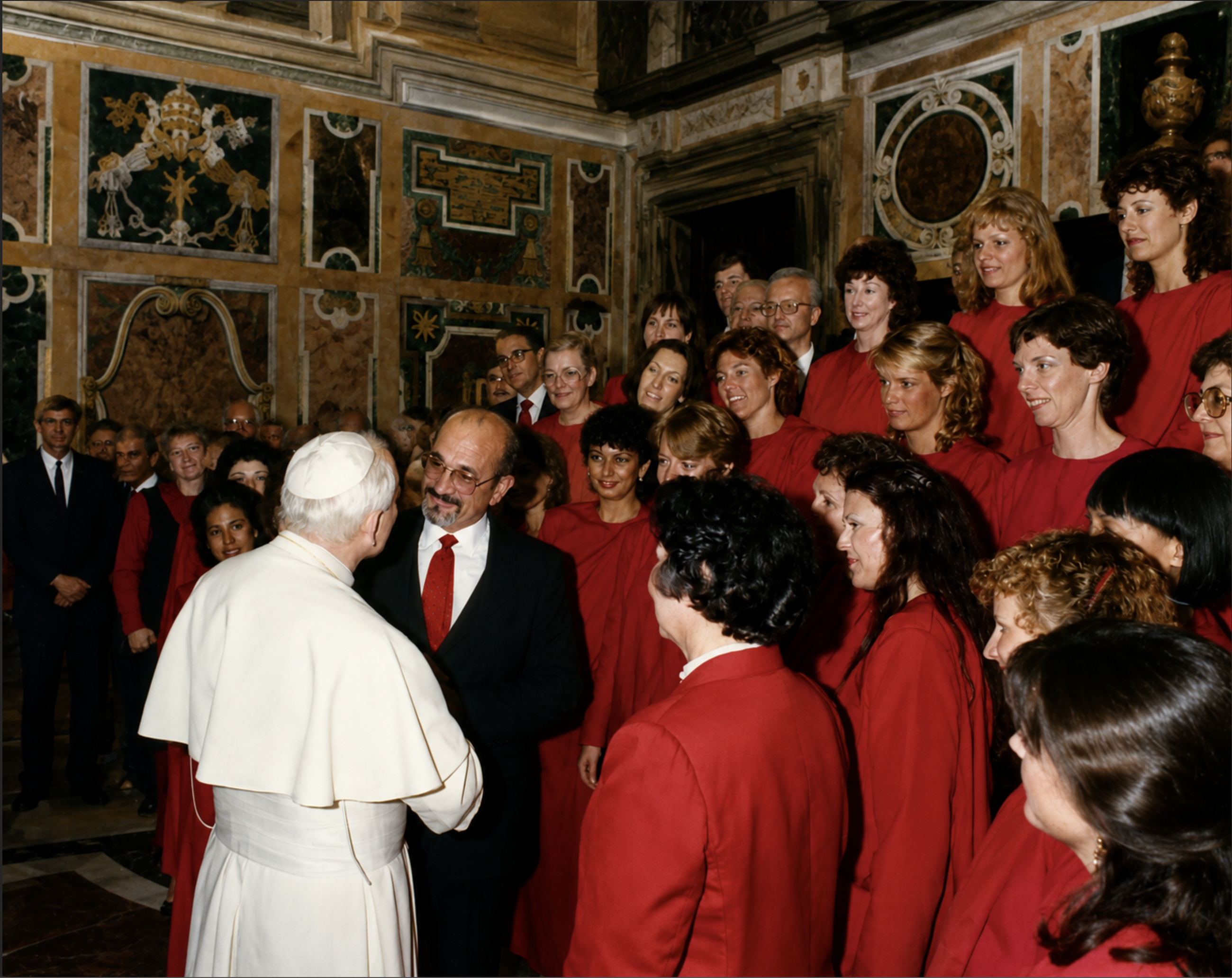
- Paul Salamunovich and Pope John Paul II along with the St. Charles Choir in a private audience in the Clementine Hall of the Vatican.
  In 1985, they performed for the Pope in a private audience in Clementine Hall of the Vatican Palace.

== Death ==
After becoming ill with the West Nile virus in September 2013, Paul Salamunovich died at the age of 86 on April 3, 2014, at a hospital in Sherman Oaks, California, of complications of the disease.

After hearing that he had died while listening to a recording of the "In Paradisum" movement from his final performance of the Durufle' Requiem with the Master Chorale, KUSC played a performance he conducted when he taught there in 2008 as a memorial radio tribute three days later.

His rosary was held at St. Charles Borromeo on May 2, 2014. His funeral was held the next day at Blessed Sacrament Church in Hollywood as St. Charles was deemed too small to house the roughly 1800 people who attended. As was the custom with members of the St. Charles Choir who died, the choir came out of the choir loft and sat downstairs near the casket as family. The entire congregation was given music and singers from all the various choirs he conducted, sang the Mass which was presided over by some 14 priests which included Cardinal Roger Mahoney. Pallbearers included composer and frequent collaborator Morten Lauridsen. He is buried at Holy Cross Cemetery.

== Recordings and DVDs ==
=== Los Angeles Master Chorale releases ===
- Lux Aeterna by Morten Lauridsen (also featuring other Lauridsen works: Chansons des Roses, Ave Maria, Mid-Winter Songs, and O Magnum mMsterium) (RCM) Grammy Nomination for Best Choral Performance, 1998.
- Dominic Argento's Te Deum and Missa "Cum Jubilo" by Maurice Duruflé (with Rodney Gilfry as baritone soloist and Frederick Swann on organ (RCM))
- Christmas, a collection of songs (RCM)

=== Los Angeles Philharmonic releases ===
- Claude Debussy, Trois nocturnes and La Damoiselle élue, Esa-Pekka Salonen conducting (Sony Classics)
- Gustav Mahler, Symphony No. 3, Esa-Pekka Salonen conducting (Sony Classics)

=== Hollywood Bowl Orchestra releases ===
- Rodgers & Hammerstein, The King & I, John Mauceri conducting (Phillips Classics)
- Schoenberg/Ravel, Earth Day, John Mauceri conducting (Phillips Classics)
- Hollywood Nightmares (various composers), John Mauceri conducting (Phillips Classics)

=== DVD ===
- "Choral Perspectives: Paul Salamunovich, Chant and Beyond" (2007), a documentary released by Hal Leonard Publishing

== Motion picture and TV work ==
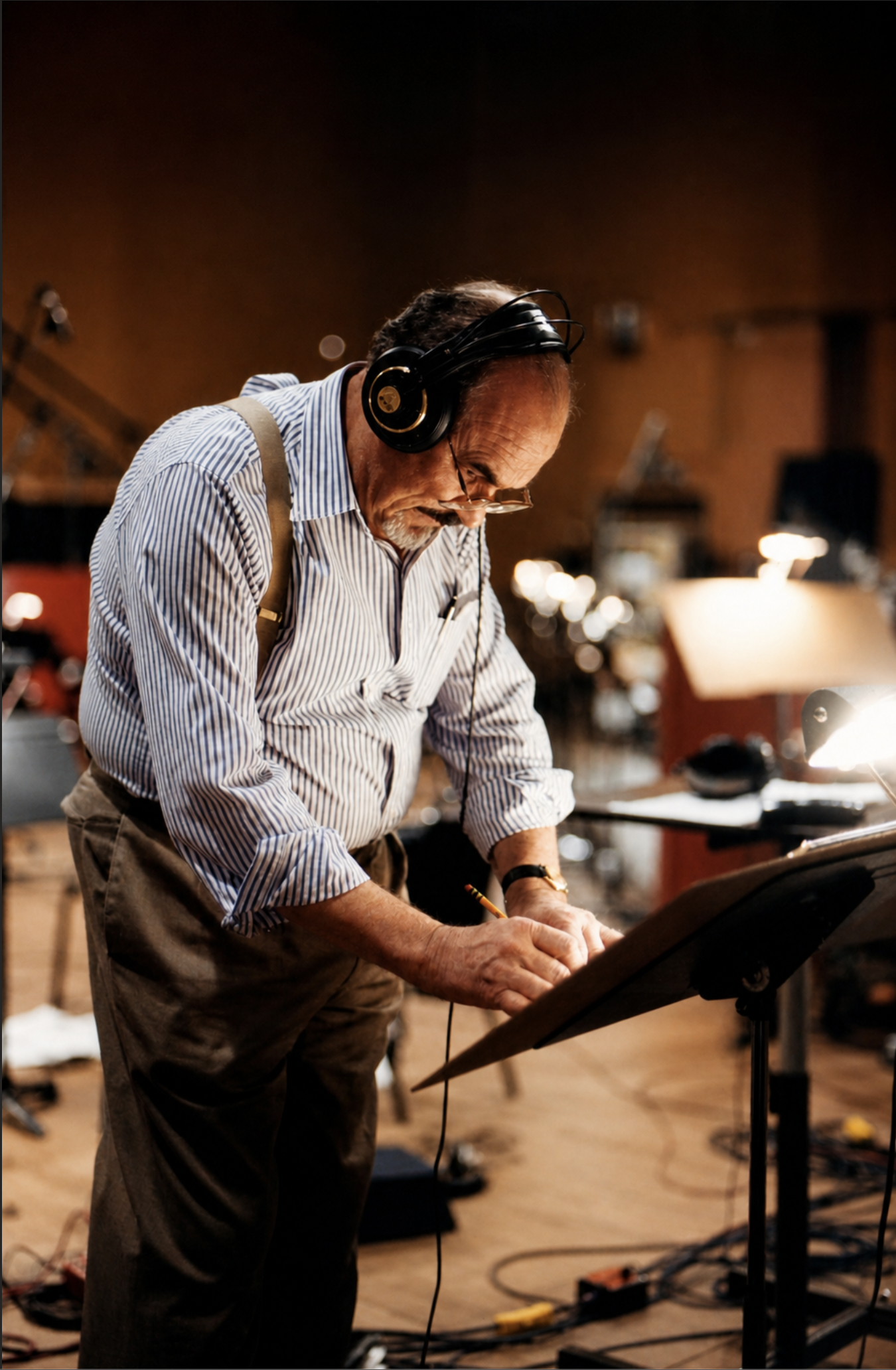
Paul Salamunovich conducting on the score of "Flatliners" in 1990.

Salamunovich was responsible for choral music for over 100 film and TV productions, including The Godfather, Angels and Demons, First Knight, Air Force One, A.I., XXX, Peter Pan, Flatliners, ER, The Sum of All Fears, and Cirque du Soleil's Journey of Man. He coached Robert De Niro in Latin for the role of a priest in True Confessions in addition to conducting the choir for that movie.

His St. Charles Borromeo choir appeared with Henry Mancini and Doc Severinsen in the NBC Christmas Eve Special The Sounds of Christmas that ran for several years in place of The Tonight Show on Christmas Eve, while the boy choir has been featured on television on The Lucy Show and with Dinah Shore in the Chevy Show. His St. Charles Boy's Choir appeared as the Disneyland Boys Choir on the original Disney album, It's A Small World.

== Awards and recognition ==
- Knight Commander of The Order of St Gregory the Great 1969
- "Distinguished Artist Award" from the Music Center of Los Angeles County (1995)
- "Lifetime Achievement Award" from the American Choral Directors Association (2000)
- Grammy nomination for recording of "Lux Aeterna" and other choral works by Morten Lauridsen 1997
- Pro Ecclesia et Pontifice The highest Papal award given to laity. 2013
