= Los Angeles Master Chorale =

American professional chorus

- Choir
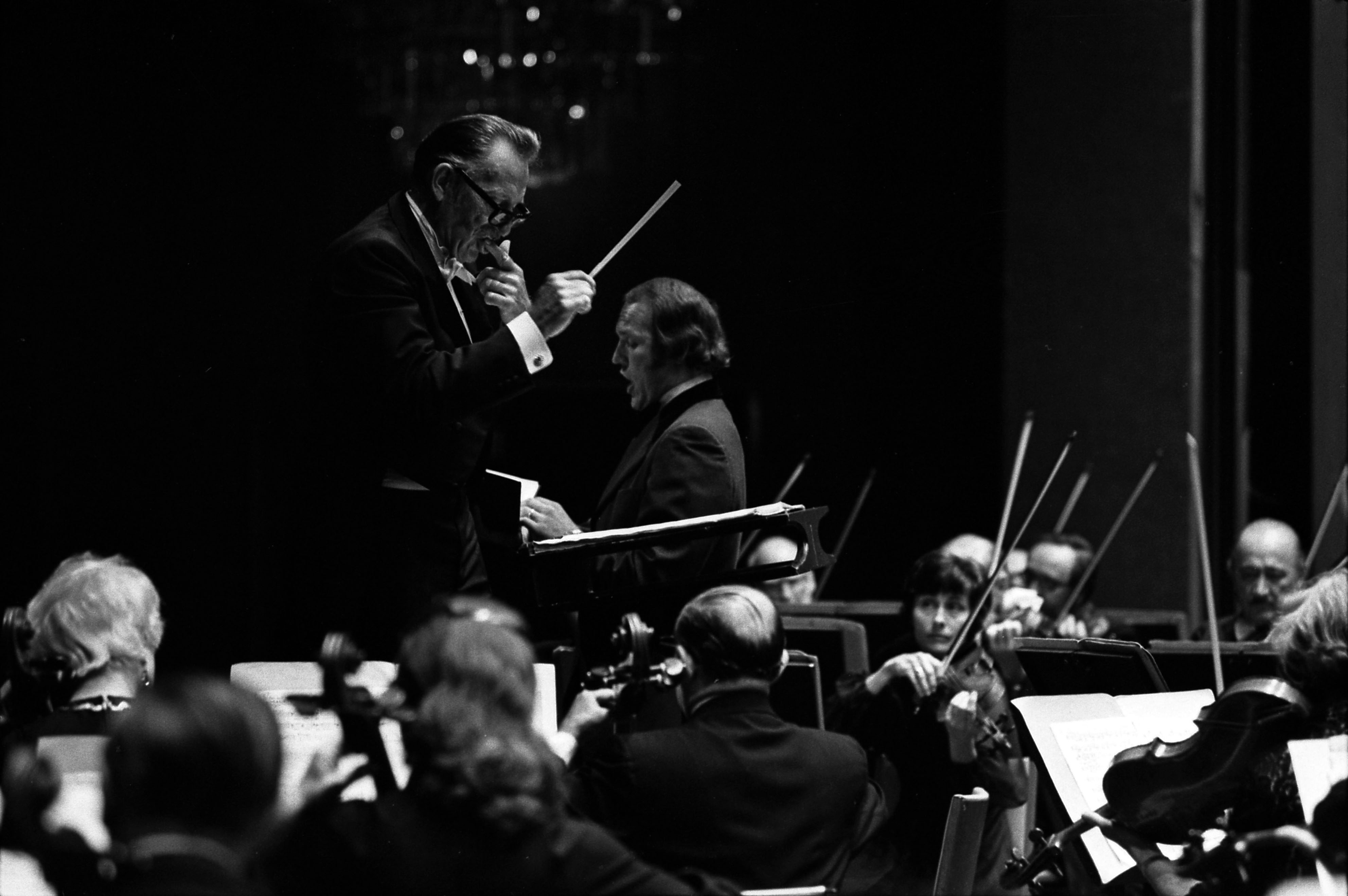
- Roger Wagner leading the Los Angeles Master Chorale in 1973
- Origin: Los Angeles, California, U.S.
- Founded: 1964
- President: Scott Altman
- Artistic Director: Grant Gershon
- Affiliation: Walt Disney Concert Hall Los Angeles Music Center
- Website: lamasterchorale.org

The Los Angeles Master Chorale is a professional chorus in Los Angeles, California, and one of the resident companies of both The Music Center and Walt Disney Concert Hall in Los Angeles. It was founded in 1964 by Roger Wagner to be one of the three original resident companies of the Music Center of Los Angeles County. Grant Gershon has been its music director since 2001, replacing Paul Salamunovich. Succeeding Jean Davidson, Scott Altman is the current President and CEO, appointed to the position on January 2, 2024.

The Master Chorale performs about ten times per year in its own season. It has presented more than 450 concerts, including early choral music to contemporary compositions. Noted for presenting numerous world, U.S. and West Coast premieres, the chorus has commissioned 24 and premiered 40 new works. The Master Chorale regularly performs with the Los Angeles Philharmonic and the Hollywood Bowl Orchestra, both at the Music Center and at the Hollywood Bowl, with such leading conductors as Gustavo Dudamel, Esa-Pekka Salonen, Zubin Mehta, André Previn, Pierre Boulez, Michael Tilson Thomas and Roger Norrington, among many others. Notable guest conductors have included Robert Shaw, Helmuth Rilling, Margaret Hillis, Robert Page and Richard Westenburg. It served as the chorus for Los Angeles Opera during that organization's early years before it had established its own in-house chorus. It also performs in community concerts throughout Southern California.

The Chorale originally performed at the Dorothy Chandler Pavilion, but since 2003 the group's principal concert venue has been Walt Disney Concert Hall. Morten Lauridsen was its composer-in-residence from 1994 through 2001.

== Leadership ==
=== Executive leadership ===
- Scott Altman, president and CEO, 2024–present
- Jean Davidson, president and CEO, 2015–2023
- Terry Knowles, president and CEO, 2011–2015
- Terry Knowles, executive director, 2000–2011

=== Artistic leadership ===
- Grant Gershon, Kiki & David Gindler Artistic Director, 2012–present
- Jenny Wong, associate artistic director, 2020–present
- Grant Gershon, music director, 2001–2012
- Paul Salamunovich, 1991–2001
- John Currie, 1986–1991
- Roger Wagner, 1964–1986

=== Artists-in-residence ===
- Eric Whitacre
- Shawn Kirchner
- Morten Lauridsen
- Reena Esmail, Swan Family Artist-in-Residence, 2020-2023

=== Officers of the board ===
- Susan Erburu Reardon, chair
- Scott Altman, president and CEO
- Tom Strickler, vice chair
- Miles Benickes, treasurer
- Courtland Palmer, secretary

== Productions ==
=== Lagrime di San Pietro ===
Composed by Orlando di Lasso, conducted by Grant Gershon, and directed by Peter Sellars, Lagrime di San Pietro (The Tears of St. Peter) is an a cappella Renaissance masterpiece set to the poetry of Luigi Tansillo (1510–1568). Debuting in 2016, singers from the Los Angeles Master Chorale transform this 75-minute work into an emotional performance piece centered around the Apostle Peter accepting responsibility and the seven stages of grief that he experienced after disavowing his knowledge of Jesus on the day he was arrested. Since its debut, Lagrime has toured internationally and been presented at the Melbourne International Arts Festival, Palacio de Bellas Artes, Cal Performances, The Barbican Center, and Cité de la Musique among others. In July 2019, Lagrime di San Pietro had the prestigious honor of performing the opening concerts that season's Salzburg Festival in Austria.

== Recordings ==
=== With music directors conducting ===
The Master Chorale has released the following recordings under Grant Gershon:

- Miserere by Henryk Górecki (Decca)
- A Good Understanding by Nico Muhly (Decca)
- Daniel Variations by Steve Reich (Nonesuch Records)
- You Are (Variations) by Steve Reich (Nonesuch Records)
- Philip Glass’ Itaipu and the world premiere recording of Two Songs to Poems of Ann Jäderlund by Esa-Pekka Salonen (RCM)
- 50th Season Celebration Concert
- Festival of Carols
- David Lang: The National Anthems and The Little Matchstick Girl Passion

The Master Chorale released three CDs under the baton of Paul Salamunovich:

- Morten Lauridsen's Grammy-nominated Lux Aeterna, Les Chansons des Roses, Ave Maria, Mid-Winter Songs and O Magnum Mysterium (RCM)
- Dominic Argento's Te Deum and Maurice Duruflé's Missa 'Cum Jubilo', with Rodney Gilfry, baritone, and Frederick Swann, organ (RCM))
- Christmas, a collection of songs (RCM)

=== With the Los Angeles Philharmonic ===
- Roger Wagner, music director
  - Mahler: Symphony No. 3, Zubin Mehta conducting (London)
  - Holst: The Planets, Zubin Mehta conducting (London)
  - Verdi: Quattro pezzi sacri (Four Sacred Pieces), Zubin Mehta conducting (London)
  - Verdi: Falstaff, Carlo Maria Giulini conducting (Deutsche Grammophon)
  - Verdi: Messa da Requiem, Zubin Mehta conducting, Gwyneth Jones, soprano; Grace Bumbry, mezzo-soprano; Franco Corelli, tenor; Ezio Flagello, baritone (Myto Records)
- John Currie, music director
  - Prokofiev: Alexander Nevsky, André Previn conducting (Telarc)
- Paul Salamunovich, music director
  - Debussy: Trois nocturnes and La Damoiselle élue, Esa-Pekka Salonen conducting (Sony Classics)
  - Mahler: Symphony No. 3, Esa-Pekka Salonen conducting (Sony Classics)
- Grant Gershon, music director
  - Shostakovich (orchestration by Gerard McBurney): Prologue to Orango, Esa-Pekka Salonen conducting (Deutsche Grammophon)
  - Verdi: Messa da Requiem, Gustavo Dudamel conducting; Ildebrando D'Arcangelo, bass; Vittorio Grigolo, tenor; Michelle DeYoung, mezzo-soprano; Julianna Di Giacomo, soprano (C Major DVD and Blu-Ray).

=== With the Hollywood Bowl Orchestra ===
- Paul Salamunovich, music director
  - Rodgers and Hammerstein, The King and I, John Mauceri conducting (Phillips Classics)
  - Schoenberg/Ravel, Earth Day, John Mauceri conducting (Phillips Classics)
  - Hollywood Nightmares (various composers), John Mauceri conducting (Phillips Classics)

== Filmography and Television ==
=== Motion pictures ===
Salamunovich also conducted the Los Angeles Master Chorale on the soundtracks of numerous major motion pictures, including A.I. Artificial Intelligence, My Best Friend's Wedding, Bram Stoker's Dracula, The Sum of All Fears and Waterworld. Gershon conducted the Chorale on the soundtracks for the motion pictures Lady in the Water, License to Wed, Charlie Wilson's War, I Am Legend, and Star Wars: The Last Jedi.

Voices of the Los Angeles Master Chorale have also been featured in such films as Star Wars: The Rise of Skywalker, How to Train Your Dragon (2025) and Superman (2025).

=== Live Television ===
The Los Angeles Master Chorale performed at the 97th Academy Awards, performing the "Lacrimosa" from Mozart's Requiem in D minor, K. 626, during the "In Memoriam" segment of the Oscars. They also performed alongside Ariana Grande and Cynthia Erivo, the stars of the 2024 film Wicked, joining them in singing the film's iconic "Defying Gravity."

== Awards and recognition ==
In June 2003, the Master Chorale received the prestigious ASCAP/Chorus America Award for Adventurous Programming. In 2008, one of the Chorale's highly successful outreach program, “Voices Within,” earned the coveted Chorus America Education Outreach Award. The Master Chorale with Paul Salamunovich conducting, received a Grammy nomination for Best Choral Performance for the recording Lux Aeterna in 1998.

== Education programs ==
Since 1989, the Master Chorale has held the Los Angeles Master Chorale High School Choir Festival, one of the largest high school choir festivals in the nation. The Festival culminates in a concert that is free to the public and typically includes over 1,000 performers.

"Voices Within" is 12-week artist residency program run by the Chorale for fifth-grade classrooms. Three teaching artists (a composer, a lyricist, and a singer) work with teams of students to write and perform original songs, often on topics drawn from their classroom curriculum. Each class writes six songs during the residency, which ends with a performance.

The Master Chorale provides education outreach to approximately 13,000 children each year.
