= List of Celtic musicians =

The six Celtic nations

The following is a list of Celtic musicians.

== British Isles ==
=== Cornwall ===
- Brenda Wootton

=== Northumberland ===
- Kathryn Tickell

=== Ireland ===
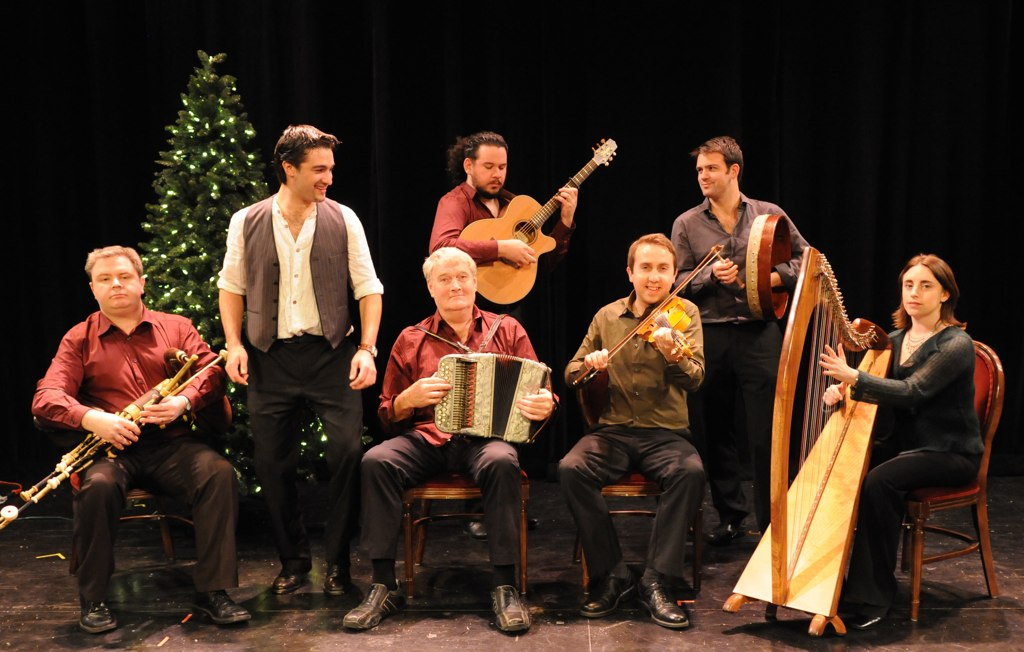
Téada

- Altan
- The Bothy Band
- Celtic Women
- The Chieftains
- Clannad
- The Corrs
- Danú
- De Dannan
- Enya
- Na Fili
- Horslips
- Hothouse Flowers
- Planxty
- Wolfe Tones

=== Scotland ===
- Alasdair Fraser
- The Battlefield Band
- Martyn Bennett
- The Boys of the Lough
- Capercaillie
- Johnny Cunningham
- Phil Cunningham
- Dougie MacLean
- Tannahill Weavers
- Silly Wizard
- Wolfstone

=== Wales ===
- Ar Log
- Fernhill
- Dafydd Iwan
- Sian James
- Carreg Lafar
- Julie Murphy
- Meic Stevens

== Continental Europe ==
=== France (Breton) ===
- Jackie Molard (violinist)
- Christian Lemaitre (violinist)
- Nolwenn Leroy
- Alan Stivell (Celtic harpist)
- Kornog

=== Poland ===
- Carrantuohill
- Shannon
- Stonehenge
- Beltaine

=== Serbia ===
- Orthodox Celts
- Irish Stew of Sindidun

== North America ==
=== Canada ===
- Irene Bridger
- Great Big Sea
- Mary Jane Lamond
- Leahy
- Ashley MacIsaac
- Buddy MacMaster
- Hadrian’s Wall
- Natalie MacMaster
- Loreena McKennitt
- The Rankin Family
- Rawlins Cross
- Spirit of the West

=== United States ===
- Black 47
- Brobdingnagian Bards
- Celtic Thunder
- Culann's Hounds
- Cherish the Ladies
- Sue Draheim
- Séamus Egan
- Marc Gunn
- Solas

== See also ==
- Category:Irish folk music groups
