= Tony McManus (musician) =

Scottish guitarist (born 1965)

- Born: 1965 (age 60–61); Paisley, Renfrewshire, Scotland
- Genres: Celtic, folk, bluegrass, classical
- Occupation: Musician
- Instrument: Guitar
- Labels: Greentrax, Culburnie, Compass, Borealis
- Website: www.tonymcmanus.com

Tony McManus (born 1965) is a guitarist from Paisley, Scotland, who plays finger-style acoustic guitar arrangements of tunes from Celtic music, classical music, and other genres. He emigrated from Scotland to Canada in 2003.

== Music career ==
In 1998, McManus substituted for the guitarist Soig Siberil in the supergroup Celtic Fiddle Festival, which consisted of the fiddlers Johnny Cunningham, Kevin Burke and Christian Lemaitre. He has worked as an accompanist for Catriona MacDonald and for the singer, guitarist and fiddler Brian McNeill. His album, Return to Kintail, was a duet with the Scottish fiddler Alasdair Fraser.

In addition to traditional Celtic music, McManus plays classical music and other genres. He performed a piece by Erik Satie for the soundtrack of a movie by Neil Jordan. The mandolin player Mike Marshall prodded him to learn Bach's E Major Prelude. He performed a chaconne by J.S. Bach at the Metropolitan Museum of Art in New York City with the jazz fusion guitarist John McLaughlin.

He released his first album, Tony McManus, in 1996 on Greentrax Recordings. He recorded his second album, Pourquoi Quebec?, in Quebec, Canada and released it on the same label in 1998. His third album, Ceol More, was released in 2002 and achieved widespread critical acclaim.

Christina Roden wrote on AllMusic, "As usual, his command of acoustic guitar technique is flawless, with a chesty, rounded, gorgeous tone and a knack for well-marked rhythms and singing phrases." Gordon Potter wrote in Living Tradition, "Here is a musician demonstrating talent by making it seem understated. This is good, this is very good indeed, and there's not much else that can be said."

The album includes a version of Charles Mingus' "Goodbye Porkpie Hat". He recorded an album with the bass guitarist Alain Genty, titled Singing Sands.

In 2017, McManus was named one of "50 Transcendent Acoustic Guitarists" in Guitar Player magazine.

== Signature model ==
In 2011, PRS Guitars created a McManus signature model guitar, a distinction he shares with the jazz guitarist Al Di Meola, the folk guitarist Martin Simpson and the rock guitarists Carlos Santana, John Mayer, Mark Lettieri, Ted Nugent and Orianthi Panagaris. The custom model, designed by Paul Reed Smith, went into development after McManus visited the bluegrass musician Ricky Skaggs in Nashville, Tennessee, while on tour in America.

== Discography ==
- Tony McManus (Greentrax, 1996)
- Pourquoi Quebec? (Greentrax, 1998)
- Return to Kintail with Alasdair Fraser (Culburnie, 1999)
- Ceol More (Compass, 2002)
- Singing Sands with Alain Gentry (Compass, 2005)
- The Maker's Mark (Compass, 2008)
- Mysterious Boundaries (Compass, 2013)
- Round Trip with Beppe Gambetta (Borealis, 2015)
- Live In Concert with Julia Toaspern (Greentrax, 2019)

=== As sideman/guest ===
- 1995 Stage by Stage, Iain MacKintosh/Brian McNeill
- 1995 This Feeling Inside, Màiri MacInnes
- 1996 Are You Willing?, Tabache
- 1996 Inchcolm, William Jackson
- 1996 No Gods, Brian McNeill
- 1996 Rod Paterson Sings Burns, Rod Paterson
- 1996 Scenes of Scotland, Isla St Clair
- 1997 Easter Snow: Irish Traditional Flute Music, Seamus Tansey
- 1998 Burns: Songs Vol. 4
- 1998 Celtic Experience, William Jackson
- 1998 Heepirumbo, Eilidh Shaw
- 1998 Hourglass, Kate Rusby
- 1998 Echo, ja:遊佐未森
- 1998 Robert Burns: The Complete Songs, Vol. 5
- 1999 Celtic Moods Gardyne Chamber Ensemble
- 1999 Last Orders, Liz Doherty
- 1999 Spirit of Ireland, Gardyne Chamber Ensemble Guitar
- 1999 Spirit of Scotland, Gardyne Chamber Ensemble Guitar
- 2000 Alloway Tales, Ian Bruce
- 2000 Auld Lang Syne: A Fine Selection of Popular Robert Burns Songs
- 2000 Bold, Catriona MacDonald
- 2000 Connected, Gibb Todd
- 2000 Fine Flowers & Foolish Glances, Mick West
- 2000 Green Yarrow, Aileen Carr
- 2000 Northern Lights Live from the Lemon Tree
- 2000 Robert Burns: The Complete Songs, Vol. 8
- 2000 Shore Street, Billy Ross
- 2000 Tryst, Iain MacInnes
- 2001 Notes from a Hebridean Island, William Jackson
- 2001 Orosay, Màiri MacInnes
- 2001 The Islay Ball, Gary West
- 2004 Live: The Art of the Steel String Guitar, Men of Steel
- 2005 Live in Genova [DVD], Beppe Gambetta
- 2006 Reunion, Daniel Lapp
- 2007 Rosewood Castle, Robin Bullock
- 2008 Strung Band of Gypsies, Doug Cox, April Verch, Cody Walters
- 2009 Hymns and Hers, Oliver Schroer
- 2009 Robert Burns: The Complete Songs, Vol. 4
- 2009 Without Words, Doug Cox
- 2010 The Wind That Shakes the Barley, Loreena McKennitt
- 2011 Live at the Teatro della Corte: The First 10 Years, Beppe Gambetta
- 2013 Everything is Moving, Laura Smith
- 2017 Clyde's Water, Fiona Ross
