= Mary Dillon (singer) =

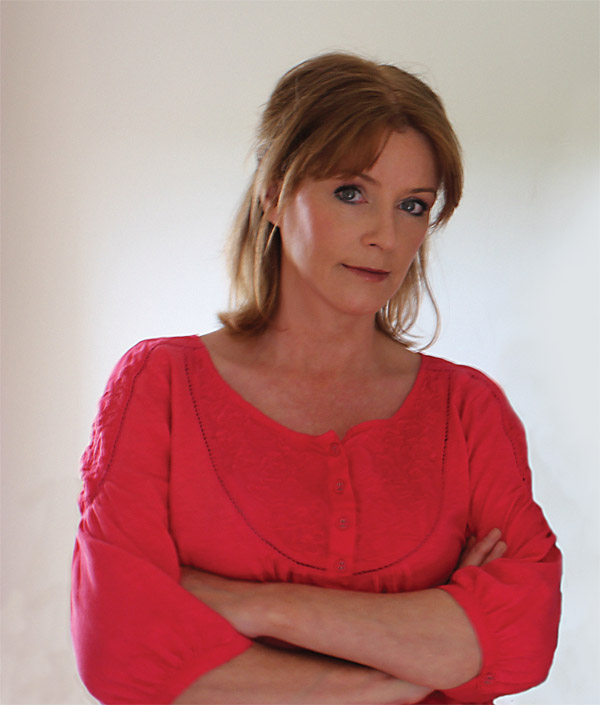
- Mary Dillon in 2012

Background information
- Born: Mary Dillon; 16 December 1964 (age 61); Dungiven, County Londonderry, Northern Ireland
- Genres: Irish traditional, Celtic, Folk
- Occupations: Singer, teacher
- Years active: 1993–present
- Labels: Green Linnet Records, Back Lane Records
- Member of: Déanta
- Website: www.marydillon.com

Mary Dillon (born 1964) is an Irish folk singer from Northern Ireland, known for her work with the traditional band Déanta. She launched her solo career in 2010 with the release of an EP entitled Army Dreamers. She is the sister of singer Cara Dillon.

== Early life ==
Mary Dillon was born in Dungiven, where she still lives with her two children, a son and a daughter. She was raised in a musical household and one of her five siblings is fellow folk singer Cara Dillon. She has never pursued singing as a full-time career and currently works as an English teacher at St Cecilia's College in Derry.

== Music career ==
Mary Dillon started singing at an early age and by her mid-teens, she had twice won the All Ireland Singing Competition at Fleadh Cheoil na hÉireann.

In the 1990s, she recorded three albums with the Irish traditional band Déanta.

In 2010, she released a digital-only EP containing covers of Army Dreamers by Kate Bush, Undone in Sorrow by Ola Belle Reed and Streets of Philadelphia by Bruce Springsteen.

In 2012, she joined fellow Irish folk singers Niamh Parsons and Tíona McSherry to form an a cappella group called Sí Van.

== Discography ==
=== Solo ===
- Army Dreamers (EP) (2010)
- North (Album) (2013)

=== As a member of Déanta ===
- Déanta (1993)
- Ready for the Storm (1994)
- Whisper of a Secret (1997)

=== Collaborations and guest appearances ===
- Cara Dillon – Cara Dillon (2001)
- Cara Dillon – Sweet Liberty (2003)
- Eamon Friel – Waltz of the Years (2003)
- Various Artists – Boys of the Island (2005)
- Cara Dillon – After the Morning (2006)
- Cara Dillon – The Redcastle Sessions (2008)
- Eamon Friel – Smarter (2009)
- Sullem Voe – All Naked Flames (2009)
- Krista Detor – Barely (2015)
