= Déanta =

Irish traditional music band

- Origin: County Antrim, Northern Ireland
- Genres: Celtic, Folk
- Years active: 1990–present
- Label: Green Linnet
- Members: Mary Dillon; Deirdre Havlin; Rosie Mulholland; Eoghan O'Brien; Kate O'Brien; Clodagh Warnock
- Past members: Paul Mullan; Mairead Walls

Déanta is an Irish traditional music band from Northern Ireland. The name of the band is the Irish word for done or made. The band was formed in the late 1980s in County Antrim and played until 1997, then regrouped in 2008. The band comprised members of the Irish traditional music scene in Ireland. They signed to Green Linnet and released three albums which blended traditional tunes and songs with arrangements sometimes veering towards a contemporary setting.

In 1990 and 1991 they were selected to represent Ireland at the Lorient Interceltic Festival, in Brittany, where they won the Trophée Loïc Raison for best band (1990).

In September 2007, the former members played at the 8th Gig 'n The Bann Festival. Their first performance after regrouping took place in October 2008 for BBC Two Northern Ireland's Blas Ceoil series.

Déanta's line-up included Mairead Walls who was later replaced by Mary Dillon (vocals, keyboard, guitar, harp), Paul Mullan (flute, whistles), siblings Eoghan (guitar, harp) and Kate O'Brien (fiddle, viola), and Clodagh Warnock (bouzouki, fiddle, bodhran, percussion). Mullan was later replaced by Deirdre Havlin and Rosie Mulholland (keyboard, fiddle) was added.

In 1995, Kate O'Brien married Paul McSherry of Tamalin. Mary Dillon, from Dungiven, is married to Paul McLaughlin of Óige. She is the second eldest of six (five sisters and a brother), her youngest sister being Cara Dillon.

== Discography ==
- Déanta (1993)
- Ready for the Storm (1994)
- Whisper of a Secret (1997)
