= Ice house (building) =

Building used for storing ice all year round, before refrigeration

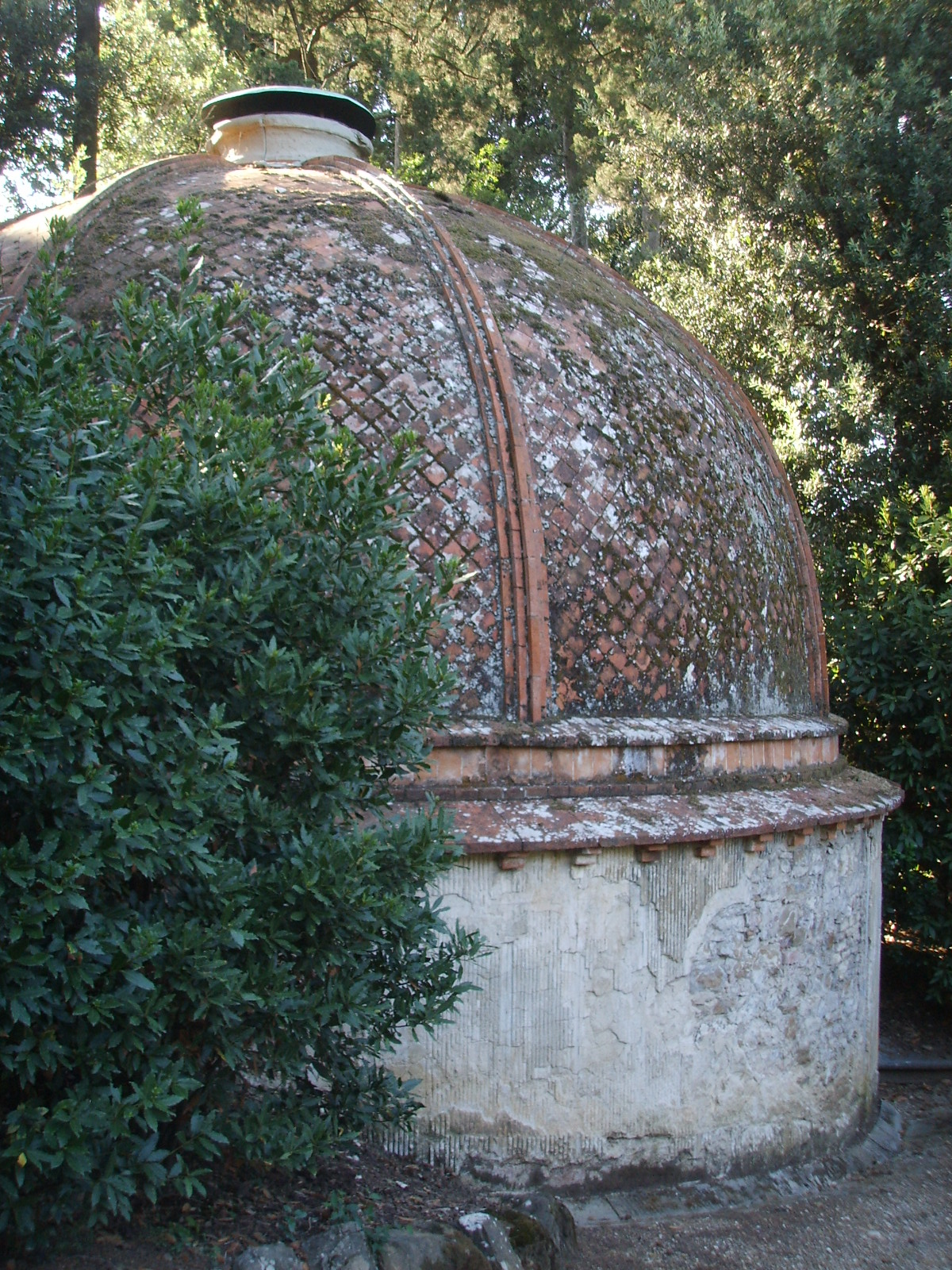
Boboli Gardens, Florence, Italy: domed icehouse (ghiacciaia) half-sunk into a shaded slope

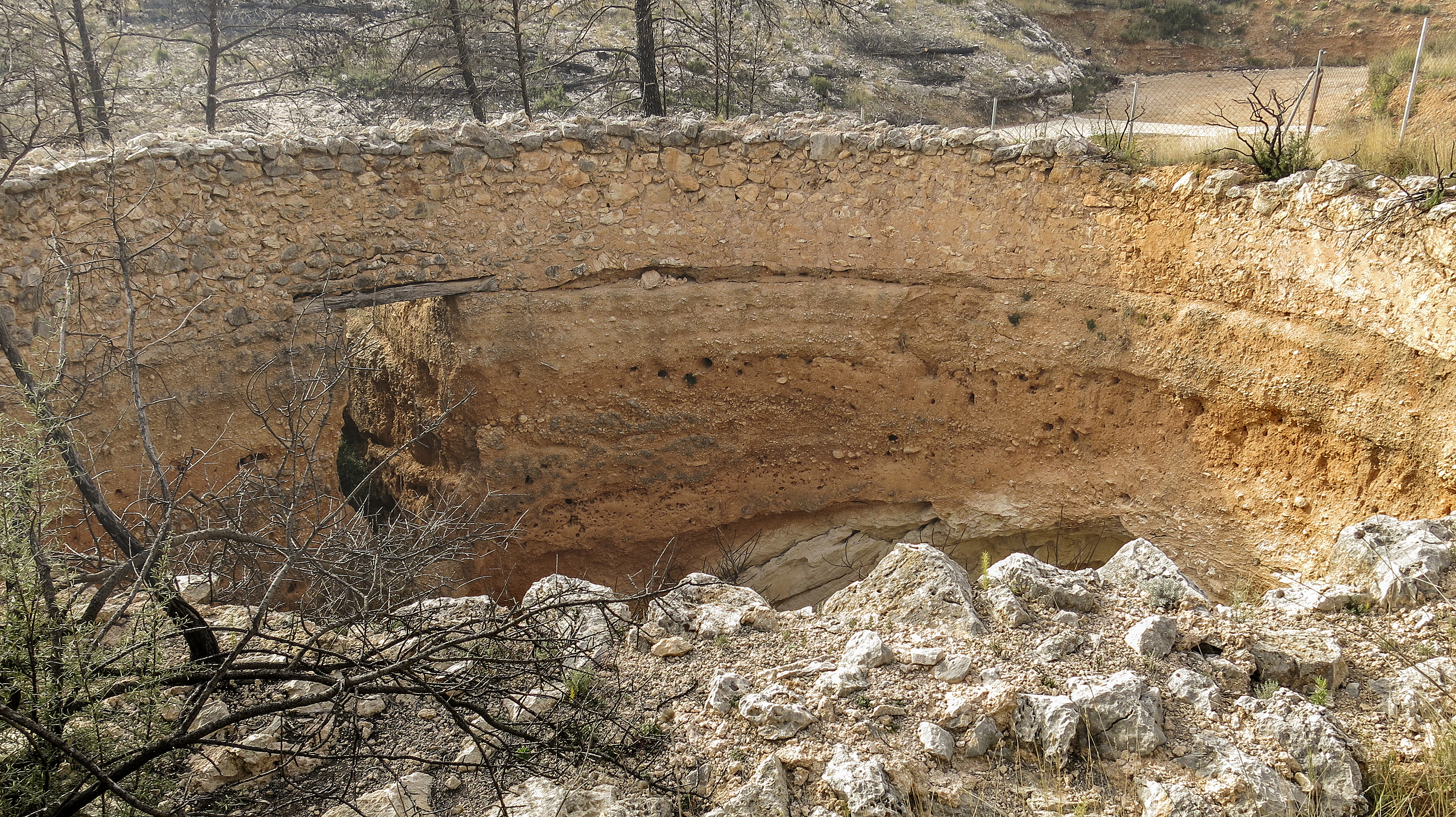
Ice house near Beneixama (Valencian Community)

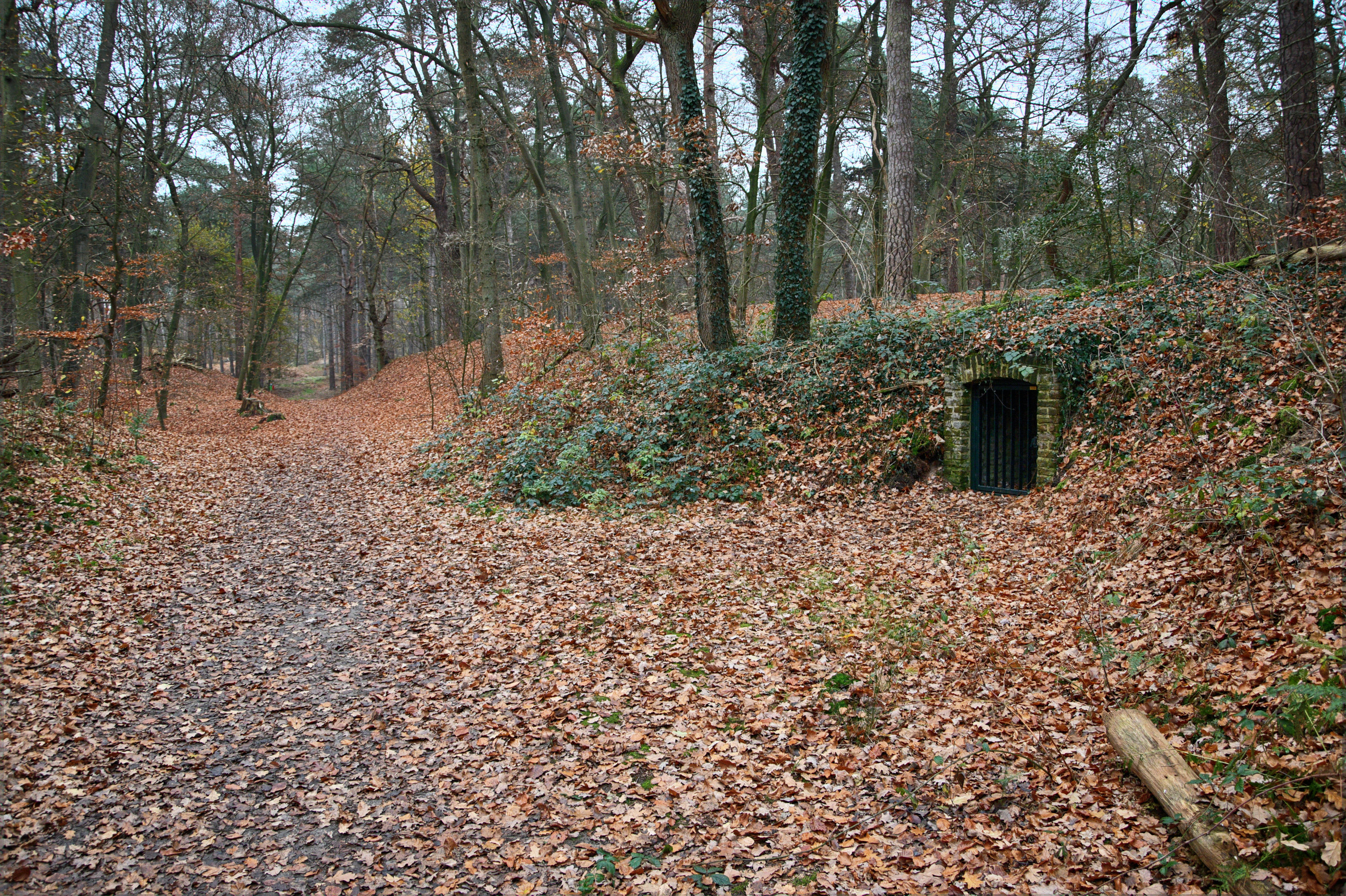
Ice house near Arcen Castle in Arcen, Netherlands

An ice house or icehouse is a building used to store ice throughout the year, commonly used prior to the invention of the refrigerator. Some were underground chambers, usually man-made, located near natural sources of winter ice, such as freshwater lakes, but many were buildings with various types of insulation.

During the winter, ice and snow would be cut from lakes or rivers, taken into the ice house, and packed with insulation (often straw or sawdust). It would remain frozen for many months, often until the following winter, and could be used as a source of ice during the summer months.

The main application of ice was food preservation, but it could also be used to cool drinks or to prepare desserts such as ice cream and sorbet. During the heyday of the ice trade, a typical commercial ice house would store 2,700 tonnes (3,000 short tons) of ice in a 9-by-30-metre (30 by 100 ft) and 14-metre-high (45 ft) building.

== History ==
A cuneiform tablet from c. 1780 BCE records the construction of an icehouse by Zimri-Lim, the King of Mari, in the northern Mesopotamian town of Terqa, "which never before had any king built." In China, archaeologists have found remains of ice pits from the 7th century BCE, and references suggest that these were in use around 1100 BCE.

Alexander the Great stored snow in pits dug for that purpose around 300 BCE. In Rome, in the 3rd century CE, snow was imported from the mountains, stored in straw-covered pits, and sold from snow shops. The ice that formed in the bottom of the pits sold at a higher price than the snow on top.

=== Persia ===
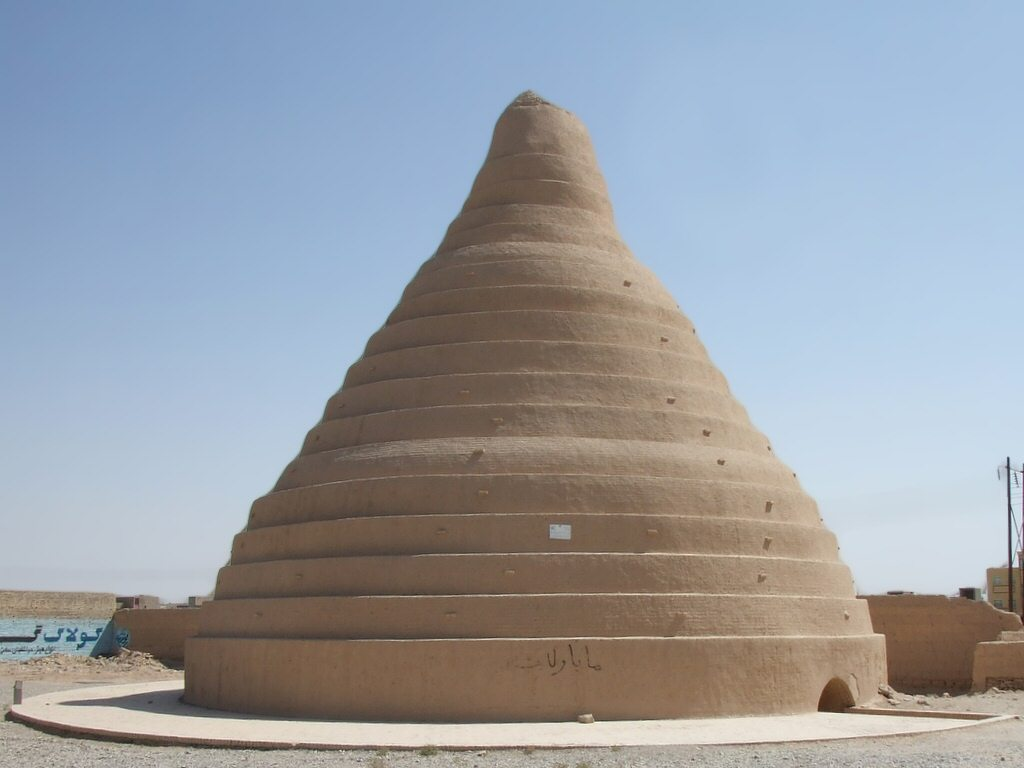
Yakhchāl of Kheshti, Iran

By 400 BCE, Persian engineers were building yakhchāls in the desert. The structure used evaporative cooling, radiative cooling, solar chimney, and diurnal heat reservoir techniques to store ice, food, and sometimes make ice. Water was often channeled from a qanat to a yakhchāl, where it freezes when the conditions were right. The most common structures have a conical shape above ground with a subterranean storage space, shade walls, and ice pool. Many that were built centuries ago remain standing.

=== United Kingdom ===
The ice house was introduced to Britain in the 1600s. James I commissioned the first modern ice house in 1619 in Greenwich Park and another in Hampton Court in 1625–6. The Hampton Court Palace ice house (or snow conserve) was a brick-lined well, which was 30 feet (9.1 m) deep and 16 feet (4.9 m) wide. A timber building with a thatched roof covered it. In 1660 Charles II had one built in London's upper St James's Park (now Green Park).

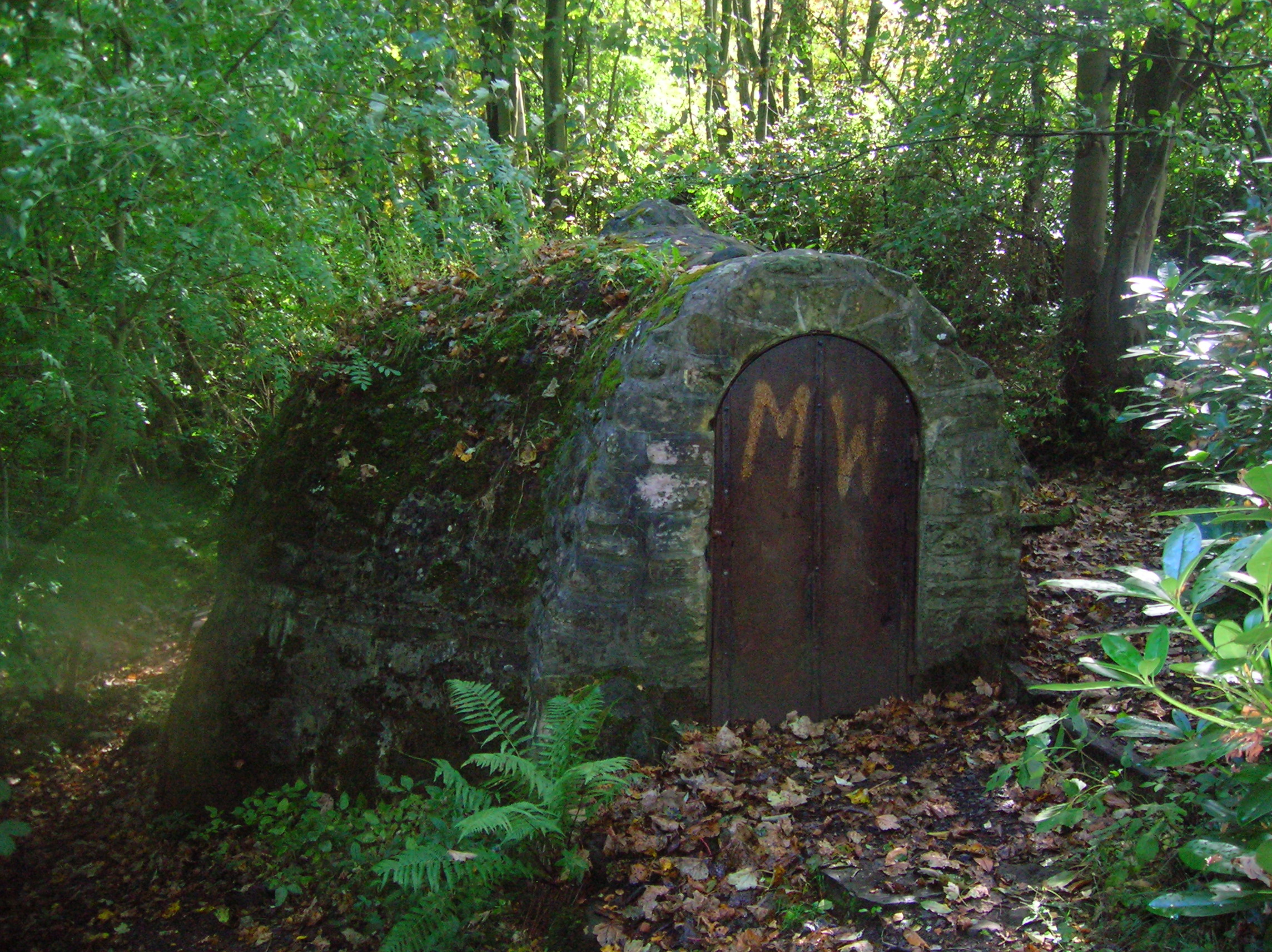
The ice house entrance, Eglinton Country Park, Scotland

Various types and designs of ice houses exist, but British ice houses were commonly brick-lined, domed structures, with most of their volume underground. Ice houses varied in design by date and builder, but were typically conical or rounded at the base to retain melted ice. They usually had a drain to take away the meltwater. Ice houses were introduced to Britain by travellers who had seen similar arrangements in Italy, where peasants collected ice from the mountains and used it to keep food fresh in caves. Ice houses were also known as ice wells, ice pits or ice mounds.

Game larders and venison larders were sometimes marked on Ordnance Survey maps as ice houses. Bruce Walker, an expert on Scottish Vernacular buildings, has suggested that relatively numerous and usually long-ruined ice houses on country estates have led to Scotland's many legends of secret tunnels.

During the 18th century, there was an increase in the construction of ice houses, often at large manor houses and their estates.

Ice was often imported into the United Kingdom from Scandinavia until the 1920s, although from around 1900 the import of ice declined sharply owing to the development of factories in the UK that produced artificial ice. Usually, only large mansions had purpose-built buildings to store ice, though there are also commercial examples, such as Great Yarmouth's ice house, which supported the town's fishing industry.

Many examples of ice houses exist in the UK, some of which have fallen into disrepair. Good examples of 19th-century ice houses can be found at Ashton Court, Bristol; Albrighton, east Shropshire; Aynhoe Park, Northamptonshire; Deddington Manor, Grendon, Atherstone; and at Christchurch Mansion, Ipswich, Suffolk; Petworth House, Sussex; Danny House, Sussex; Ayscoughfee Hall, Spalding, Lincolnshire; Rufford Abbey, Eglinton Country Park, Scotland; Parlington Hall, Yorkshire; Croxteth Hall, Liverpool; Burghley House, Stamford; and Moggerhanger House, Moggerhanger, Bedfordshire.

An unusual example of an ice house that was converted from a redundant brick springhead can be found in the former grounds of Norton House, Somerset. The largest surviving ice house in the UK is the Tugnet Ice House in Spey Bay. It was built in 1830, and used to store ice for packing salmon caught in the River Spey before transportation to market in London.

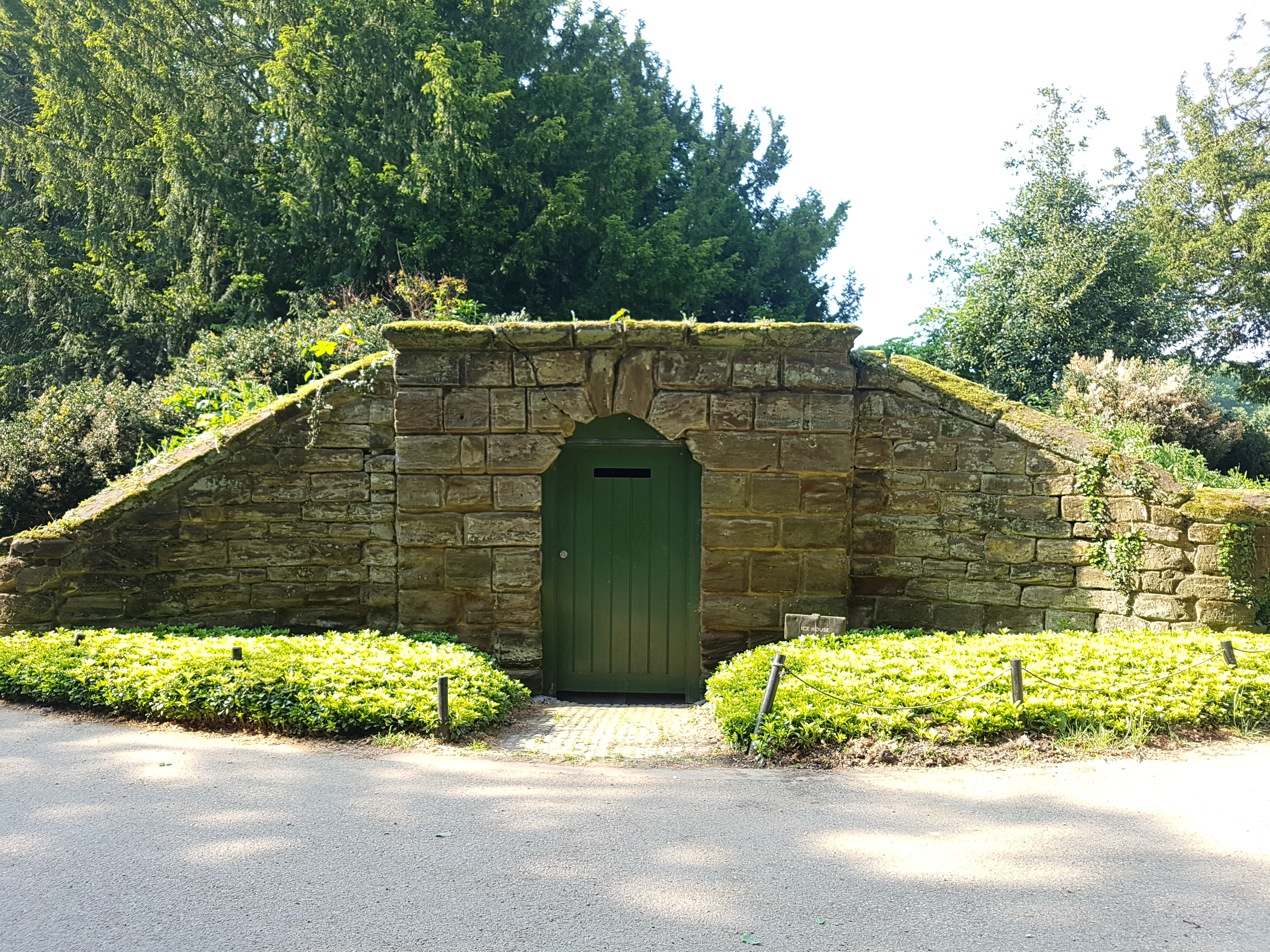
The ice house at Moggerhanger House, Moggerhanger, Bedfordshire

During the Second World War (between 1939 and 1945) old ice houses found new uses. Although some were used to store ice and food, others, because they were often underground and well built, became air raid shelters.

In 2018, the very large Park Crescent West ice well was discovered in Park Crescent, London. It was created for Samuel Dash in the early 1780s for commercial use, before the construction of the John Nash crescent began in 1806. This ice house is 9.5 metres (31 ft) deep, and 7.5 metres (25 ft) wide, and is only a few metres away from the Jubilee line on the London Underground. Originally used for the storage of local ice taken from the River Thames in the winter months, it was taken over in the 1820s by the ice merchant William Leftwich, who used it for storing imported ice from the frozen lakes of Norway.

A pair of commercial ice wells has been preserved in London, beneath what is now the London Canal Museum at King's Cross. They are around 30 feet in diameter and were originally 42 feet deep. They were built in 1857 and 1863 by the Swiss entrepreneur Carlo Gatti.

=== Ireland ===
In 1985, a passage was discovered beneath Ardgillan Castle in Co. Dublin, Ireland. This passage was found to be the ice house that had been known to exist on the grounds, but whose location had not been rediscovered until this date. There are other ice houses still surviving in Ireland, for example on the Woodstock Estate near Inistioge, Co. Kilkenny, at the former Rockingham Estate in Boyle, Co. Roscommon, now accessible within Lough Key Forest Park, and in the grounds of Dunsany Castle in Co. Meath.

=== United States ===
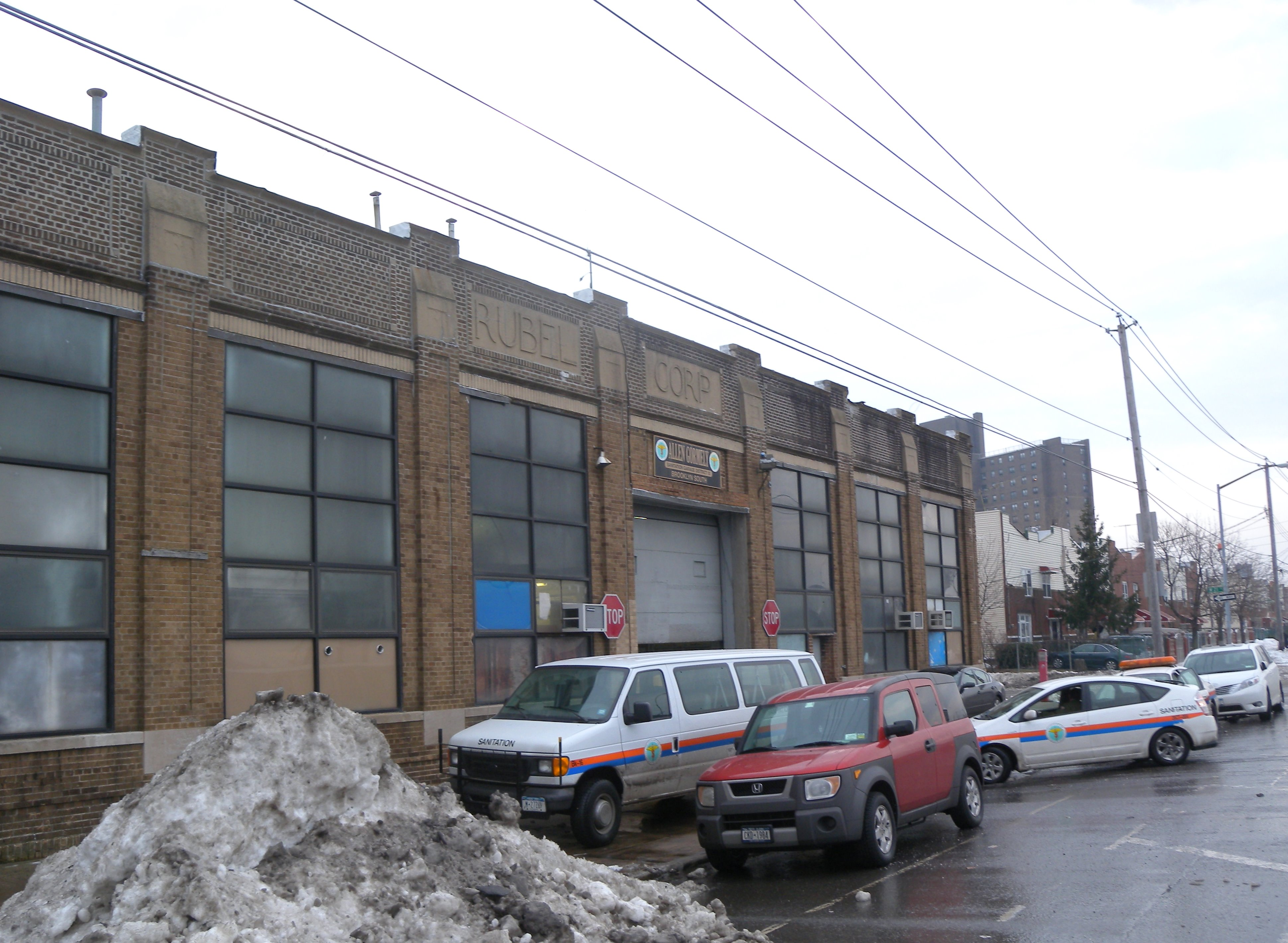
Former icehouse in Coney Island, Brooklyn, New York City

Ice houses allowed a trade in ice that was a major part of the early economy of the New England region of the United States, which saw fortunes made by people who transported ice in straw-packed ships to the southern states and throughout the Caribbean Sea. Most notable was Frederic Tudor (known as Boston's "Ice King") who formed the Tudor Ice Company in the early 19th century. In winter months, ice was chipped from a lake surface and often dragged by sled to the ice house. In summer months, icemen delivered it to residences in ice-wagons; the ice would then be stored in an icebox, which was used much like a modern refrigerator.

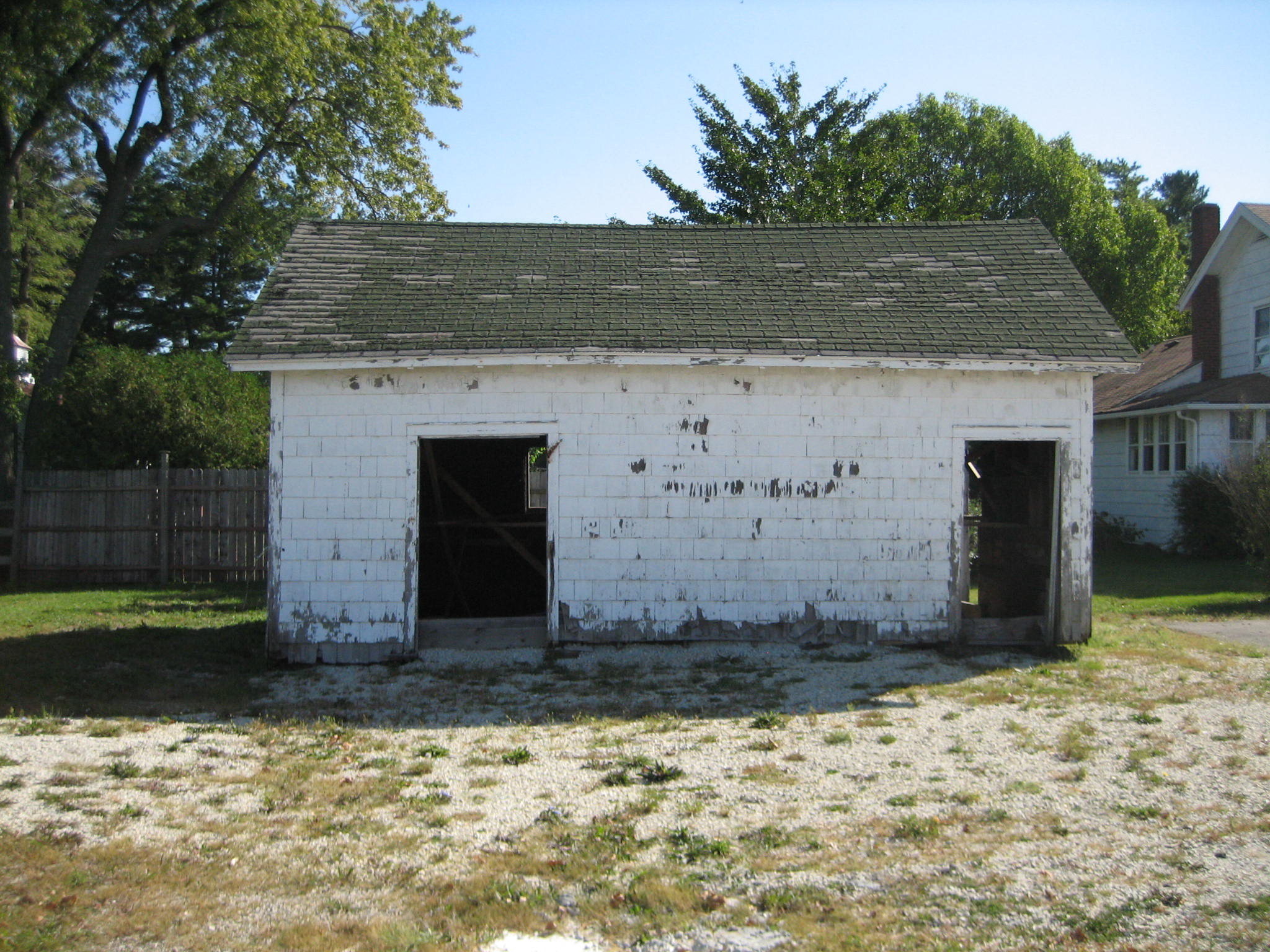
An abandoned c. 1930 commercial ice house near Ambler's Texaco Station in Dwight, Illinois, United States

As home and business refrigeration became more commonplace, ice houses fell into disuse, and the home ice delivery business declined until it had virtually disappeared by the late 1960s. Smaller ice houses, often no more than a sawdust pile covered by a makeshift roof or tarpaulin, continued to be maintained for storing ice for use in local events such as fairs. Today, most ice for daily consumption is made in a home freezer, while bulk ice is manufactured, distributed and sold like other retail commodities. At least two icehouses are still operated traditionally, as a tourist attractions in New England, and DuPage County, Illinois.

==== Texas and the American South ====
In Texas, former ice houses are a cultural tradition. Ice merchants diversified to sell groceries and cold beer, serving as early convenience stores and local gathering places. The widespread 7-Eleven chain of convenience stores in the U.S., first known as U-Tote'm Stores, developed from ice houses operated by ice manufacturers, like the Southland Ice Manufacturing Company, in Houston, Dallas, and San Antonio in the 1930s. Southland was not the only company in the Southern United States to develop a convenience-store corporation from an ice business. Munford Inc. of Atlanta began in the early 20th century by vending both ice and coal from mule-drawn wagons, as the Atlantic Ice and Coal Company. By the 1970s, Munford, Inc. was operating a large chain of convenience stores with the name Majik Market (the company was sold in 1988 and filed Chapter 11 bankruptcy in 1990).

In some parts of Texas, especially from San Antonio and the Texas Hill Country down to the Mexican border, ice houses functioned as open-air bars, with the word "icehouse" becoming a colloquialism for an establishment that derives the majority of its income from the sale of cold beer. The distinction between South Texas ice houses and ice houses of other parts of the state and the South has been connected to the Catholicism of the region, a deeper-rooted Mexican culture, and the influence of German immigrants.

== See also ==
- Deep water source cooling
- Environmental technology
- Ice cutting
- Ice pond
- Seasonal thermal energy storage (STES)
- Thermal energy storage
