= Cullen Bay (album) =

Studio album by The Tannahill Weavers
- Released: 1990
- Recorded: June 1990
- Genre: Scottish Traditional Folk
- Length: 33:31
- Label: Green Linnet Records
- Producer: The Tannahill Weavers

The Tannahill Weavers chronology
Best of the Tannahill Weavers 1979-1989 (1989)	Cullen Bay (album) (1990)	The Mermaid's Song (1992)

Professional ratings
Review scores
Source	Rating
Allmusic	4/5 stars

Cullen Bay is an album by the Scottish traditional folk band The Tannahill Weavers, released in 1990. The band is joined on several tracks (Braw Burn the Bridges, Jenny Dang the Weaver and A Night Visitor's Song) by cittern-player Stuart Morison. Cullen Bay itself is at Cullen, Moray on the coast of the Moray Firth, west of Spey Bay between the towns of Elgin and Banff. The album was recorded at Pierhouse Studios, Edinburgh, Scotland.

== Track listing ==
1. The Standard on the Braes O'Mar / The Haughs O' Cromdale
2. The Fiddler / The Fiddler's Jig / Jenny Dang the Weaver / The Reel of Tulloch
3. Joy of My Heart
4. Aikendrum
5. Samuel the Weaver / The Panda / Thunderhead / The Cannongate Twitch / Allan MacDonald's Reel
6. Kintail
7. A Night Visitor's Song
8. Cullen Bay / Dalnahassaig / S'Iomadh Rud a Chunnaic Mi / Alick C. MacGregor
9. Braw Burn the Bridges

== Personnel ==
- Roy Gullane - guitar, vocals
- Iain MacInnes - Highland bagpipes, Scottish small pipes, whistles
- John Martin - fiddle, 'cello, vocals
- Phil Smillie - flute, whistles, bodhrán, vocals
- Les Wilson - bouzouki, keyboards, bass pedals, vocals
