= Cullen Bay =

Cullen Bay may refer to:

- Cullen Bay, at Cullen, Moray, Scotland, bay contained between Scarnose to the westward and Logie head to the eastward
- Cullen Bay, Darwin, Australia, man-made marina and housing development
- Cullen Bay (album), by the Scottish traditional folk band The Tannahill Weavers, 1990
