= Never in a Million Years =

Never in a Million Years may refer to:

- "Never in a Million Years" (1937 song), a song written by Mack Gordon and Harry Revel
- "Never in a Million Years" (Cara Dillon song), 2006
- "Never in a Million Years" (Laura Branigan song), 1990
- "Never in a Million Years", a song by The Boomtown Rats on their 1982 album, V Deep
- Never in a Million Years, a 1995 album by Kenny Davern
