= John Condon (British Army soldier) =

Irish soldier

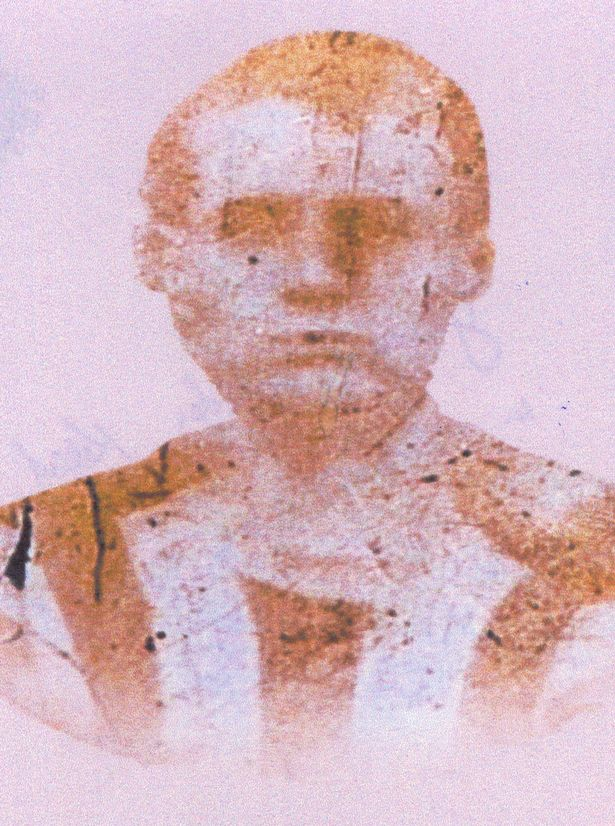
- John Condon photographed sometime between 1913 and 1915
- Born: 5 October 1897; Waterford City, Ireland
- Died: 24 May 1915 (aged 17); Ypres, Belgium
- Military career
- Allegiance: United Kingdom
- Branch: British Army
- Service years: 1913-1915
- Rank: Private
- Units: Third Battalion, The Royal Irish Regiment (1684)
- Conflicts: World War I: Western Front; Second Battle of Ypres †

Pte. John Condon (5 October 1897 – 24 May 1915) was an Irish soldier born in Waterford City. He was mistakenly believed to have been the youngest Allied soldier killed during the First World War, at the age of 14 years; he lied about his age and he claimed to be 18 years old when he signed up to join the army in 1913. He was killed in action in a gas attack during the Second Battle of Ypres in 1915 and his body was not recovered for another ten years; his family were unaware that Condon was in Belgium until they were contacted by the British Army and told that he was missing in action. In 1922, Condon was also posthumously awarded the British War Medal, the Victory Medal and the 1914-15 Star.

It is now believed from a birth certificate, census, war diaries and other records that John Condon would have been 17 years old at the recorded date of his death and that the wrong individual is named on the grave. At the present time, the headstone in Poelkapelle Cemetery and the CWGC record continue to assert the challenged data.

== In popular culture ==
Condon is the subject of the song of the same name by Mary Dillon, released in 2013 as a single from her debut album North.

== Gallery ==
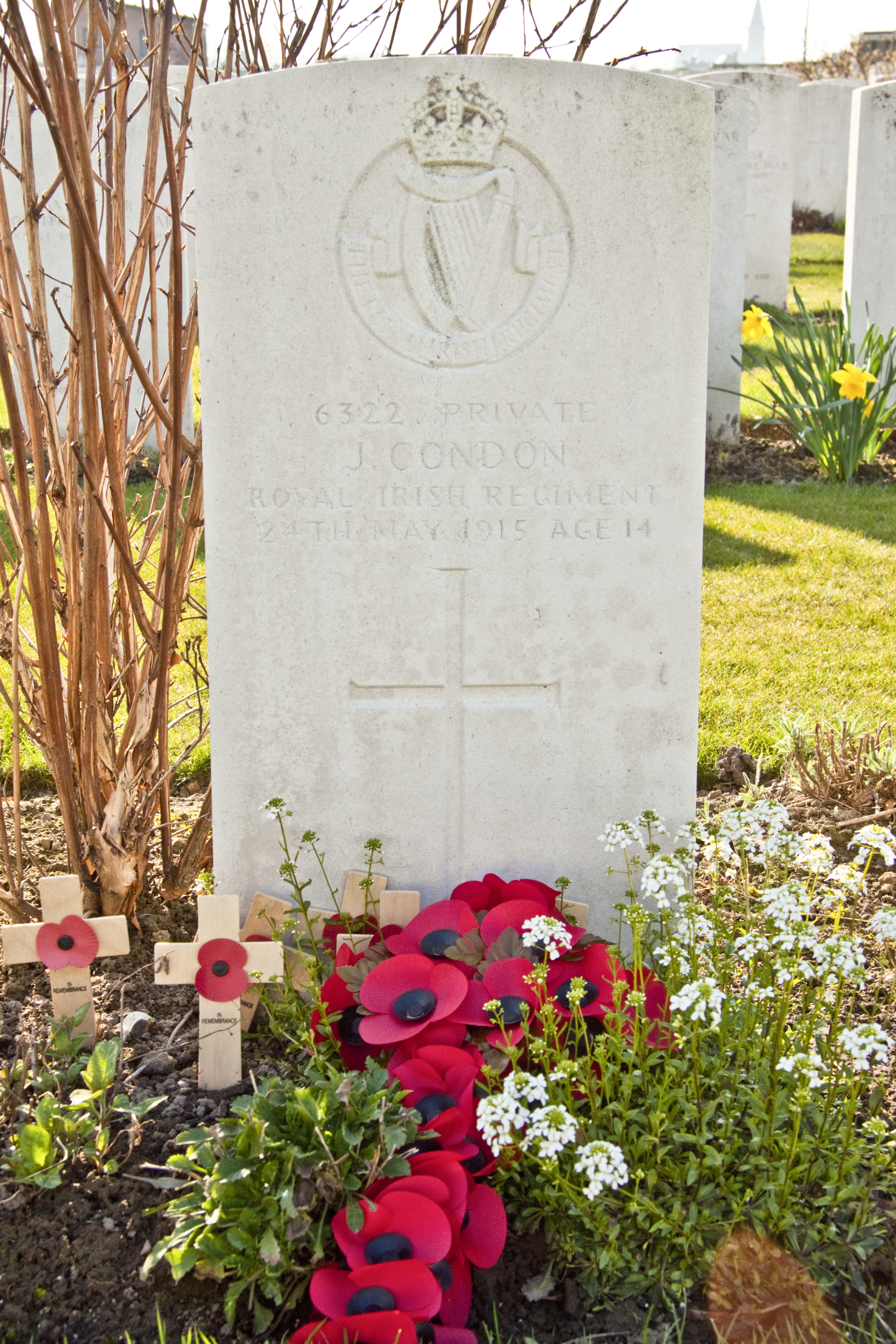
Gravestone of John Condon at the Poelcapelle British Cemetery
