= Land of Light =

Studio album by The Tannahill Weavers
- Released: 1986
- Recorded: 1985–86
- Genre: Scottish traditional folk
- Length: 39:55
- Label: Green Linnet Records
- Producer: The Tannahill Weavers

The Tannahill Weavers chronology
Passage (1984)	Land of Light (1986)	Dancing Feet (1987)

Professional ratings
Review scores
Source	Rating
Allmusic	4/5 stars

Land of Light is an album by the Scottish traditional folk band The Tannahill Weavers which was released in 1986. The band is joined on several tracks (Bustles and Bonnets, The American Stranger, Conon Bridge, Donald MacLean's Farewell to Oban and The Scottish Settler's Lament) by Scottish fiddler Dougie MacLean. The album was recorded at Castle Sound Studios, the Old School, Midlothian, Scotland.

== Track listing ==
1. Lucy Cassidy / The Bletherskate / The Smith of Chilliechassie
2. The Scottish Settler's Lament
3. Donald MacLean's Farewell to Oban / Dunrobin Castle / The Wise Maid / Iain's Jig
4. The Rovin' Heilandman
5. The Yellow-haired Laddie / Dream Angus
6. Land of Light
7. The Queen amang the Heather / Mairi Anne MacInnes
8. Bustles and Bonnets
9. The American Stranger
10. Conon Bridge / MacBeth's Strathspey / Maor David Manson / Mrs MacPherson of Inveran

== Personnel ==
- Roy Gullane - guitar, mandolin, tenor banjo, vocals
- Phil Smillie - flute, whistles, pan pipes, vocals
- Ian MacInnes - war pipes, G Scottish small pipes, B-flat Scottish small pipes, whistles, vocals
- Ross Kennedy - bouzouki, fiddle, bass pedals, vocals
