= This Time/I Wish You Well =

Single by Cara Dillon

from the album After The Morning
- A-side: "This Time/I Wish You Well"
- Released: 14 August 2006
- Recorded: 2006
- Genre: Folk, pop
- Length: 4:01, 4:20
- Label: Rough Trade
- Songwriter(s): Cara Dillon, Sam Lakeman, Katie Marne, Chuck Norman
- Producer(s): Sam Lakeman, Mike 'Spike' Drake

Cara Dillon singles chronology
"Never in a Million Years" (2006)	"This Time/I Wish You Well" (2006)	"If I Prove False" (2008)

"This Time/I Wish You Well" is the second single release from After the Morning, the third album by Cara Dillon. "This Time" was remixed with additional vocals, electric guitar and percussion for the single. The release date of the double A-side single was originally 31 July 2006, to coincide with Cambridge Folk Festival (which Dillon was to perform at), but was changed to 14 August 2006. The radio mix of "This Time" later became available on the Irish compilation album Tuesday's Child as well.

== Personnel ==
- Cara Dillon - vocals
- Sam Lakeman – piano, guitar, accordion, percussion, producer
- Simon Lea – drums
- Ben Nicholls – bass guitar, banjo, upright bass
- Neil MacColl – acoustic and electric guitar, mandolin
- Roy Dodds - percussion
