= Paul McSherry =

Guitarist from Northern Ireland

- Genres: Folk
- Occupation: Musician
- Instrument: Guitar

Paul McSherry is a guitarist from Northern Ireland who began playing in 1982, aged 14. He was inspired by two guitarists from his native West Belfast, Maurice McHugh and Mark Kane, and was self-taught on DAGDAD tuning.

He was a member of a band named. "The McSherrys", which changed its name to Tamalin in the late 1980s. He also played in the Belfast band "Commonalty", which recorded an album in 1989, but only released on cassette. In 1997, Tamalin released their debut album Rhythm and Rhyme. He has accompanied on stage, and recorded with, such musicians as Liam O'Flynn, Paddy Keenan, Paddy Glackin, Cathal Hayden, Michael McGoldrick, Tommy Peoples, Kevin Crawford, Gerry O'Connor (fiddle player), and John McSherry, and singers Tommy Makem and Brian Kennedy.

== Discography ==
- Grianan "The Maid of Eirin" (1990)
- Niamh Parsons, "Loosely Connected" (1992)
- Brian Finnegan, "When the Party's Over" (1993)
- Wild Flowers, "Total Vocal" (1993)
- Susan Tommelty, "Belfast(Live)" (1996)
- O'Aces, "On oiche go Maidin" (1997)
- Tamalin, "Rhythm and Rhyme" (1997)
- Ray Gallen, "Man of the House" (1998)
- Cormac Breathnach, "Musical Journey" (1999)
- Jason O'Rourke, "The Bunch of Keys" (1999)
- Michael McGoldrick and John McSherry, "At First Light" (2001)
- John Kennedy, "Together in Time" (2001)
- Gerry O'Connor, "Journeyman" (2004)
- Pádraig Rynne, "Bye A While" (2005)
- At First Light, "Tripswitch" (2006)
- Brendan Hendry, Brendan Mulholland, Paul McSherry, ‘Tuned up’ (2008)
- Guidewires, "Live" (2009)
- Siobhan Skates, "Better than a Dream" (2009)
- John McSherry, "Soma" (2010)
- Brendan Hendry, Paul McSherry, Nodlaig Brolly, ‘Stringtones” (2010)
- Guidewires, "II" (2011)
- At First Light, ‘Idir” (2011)
- Sylvain Barou, ‘Sylvain Barou”(2012)
- Ian Carmichael, ‘Ten Years On” (2015)
- Marco Fabbri, ‘Crossroads” (2016)
