= Rare Air =

Canadian Celtic folk band

- Also known as: Na Cabarfeidh
- Genres: Celtic rock folk rock
- Years active: 1970s–1991
- Labels: Green Linnet Records, Flying Fish Records

Rare Air, formerly Na Cabarfeidh, was a Canadian band that played an eccentric mix of instruments, including bagpipes, flutes, whistles, bombardes, bass guitar, and keyboards. Its first two albums were released under the name Na Cabarfeidh and the following four under the new name, Rare Air.

== History ==
The group was founded in the late 1970s as a Celtic folk music band, was originally led by bagpipers Grier Coppins and Pat O'Gorman. The name Na Cabarfeidh means "the Cabarfeidh" in Gaelic, referring to the Cabar Feidh Pipe Band in which they had both played.

In 1982, Na Cabarfeidh released an album produced by Sometimes We Do This Musical Productions. At the time of album, the band included Ian Goodfellow, Grier Coppins, Richard Murai, Patrick O'Gorman, and Trevor Ferrier. The instruments on this album were Great Highland Bagpipes, acoustic guitar, long drum, whistle, bombarde, biniou koz, peaucloche, voices, cylinder drums, and tabla. The song Bretonia was based on a melody of a Breton love song, "J'ai travaillé la longue des jours," as sung to the band by Pierrig Hercelin of Les Fougerets. Their sound was a fusion of Celtic, rock and a Caribbean beat.

After the band's second album, Rare Air, Goodfellow left, and the band changed its name to the more easily pronounced Rare Air. In 1985, the group released Mad Plaid on the Flying Fish label.

Rare Air toured the world, and extensively in the southern United States. Their early music took the sounds of Celtic music from Scotland, Ireland, Brittany and North America and combined it with funky bass rhythms and driving polyrhythmic percussion. In 1990, two of the four founding members, Trevor Ferrier and Richard Murai, left to pursue their own musical interests, and the band changed musical direction with the addition of Christian Frappier, Jeff Gill, and Rich Greenspoon. Rare Air's music became more jazz-oriented and it was soon tagged with the "jazz fusion" label.

After the last album, Space Piper, the group disbanded.

== Discography ==
- Stick It in Your Ear (1981)
- Rare Air (1982)
- Mad Plaid (1984)
- Hard to Beat (1987)
- Primeval (1989)
- Space Piper (circa 1991)
