= Celtic Fiddle Festival =

- Origin: Celtic territories, including Ireland, Scotland and Brittany
- Genres: Celtic, Scottish traditional, Irish traditional, music of Brittany
- Years active: 1993–present
- Label: Loftus Music
- Members: Kevin Burke: Christian Lemaitre; Charlie McKerron; Nicolas Quemener
- Past members: Johnny Cunningham: André Brunet
- Website: Celtic Fiddle Festival on Facebook

Celtic Fiddle Festival is a group of Celtic fiddlers active since 1993. Representing three branches of Celtic culture, the members were Johnny Cunningham from Scotland, late of Silly Wizard, Kevin Burke from Ireland, best known for the Bothy Band, and Christian Lemaître from Brittany, member of Kornog. Since Cunningham's death in 2003, the group has continued to perform, replacing him with André Brunet from Quebec, formerly of La Bottine Souriante. In 2015 Andrè Brunet left the band and was replaced by Scottish Fiddler, Charlie McKerron, who is also in the band Capercaille.

Cunningham and Burke were both resident in the US and decided they wanted to tour together. It was suggested that a show with just two fiddlers, one Scottish, one Irish might not be appealing to many but if another element could be added it might be of interest. Because of their love for Breton music Kevin and Johnny decided to contact their good friend, Christian Lemaître, from Brittany. Christian agreed and the Celtic Fiddle Festival was born.

It was conceived as a "one-off" tour, an interesting way to showcase the three differing styles while at the same time demonstrating the deep historic connections, but the response from audiences was so positive that an album was released from that initial tour and, twenty years later, the group is still playing and recording. Cunningham, Burke, and Lemaître were accompanied by guitarist John McGann on that first tour and the first album, The Celtic Fiddle Festival, was released on Green Linnet Records. The sixth album by the Celtic Fiddle Festival, Live in Brittany, was recorded in January 2013 and released later that year on the Loftus Music label.

During the group's twenty-year career its accompanists have included Breton guitarist Soïg Sibéril, Scottish guitar player Tony McManus, Ged Foley from the Battlefield Band and Patrick Street, and Nicolas Quemener from Brittany.

Each Celtic Fiddle Festival concert begins with a short solo performance from each fiddler to demonstrate the individual styles of music. The musicians then all play together.

== Discography ==
- Celtic Fiddle Festival (1993)
- Celtic Fiddle Festival: Encore (1998)
- Rendezvous (2001)
- Play on (2005)
- Équinoxe (2008)
- Live in Brittany (20th Anniversary Concert) (2013)
- Storm In a Teapot (2016)
- Humoresque (2025)
