= Ad Vielle Que Pourra =

Canadian band

- Origin: Quebec, Canada
- Genres: Folk music, French Celtic music
- Years active: 1986-2000
- Labels: Green Linnet Records, Xenophile Records
- Members: Daniel Thonon; Luc Thonon; Gilles Plante; Alain Leroux; Clement Demers; Sarah Lesage

Ad Vielle Que Pourra was a Quebec-based music group which performed original compositions in the style of the French, Québécois, and Breton folk music traditions. The band's name came from the vielle (the French term for the hurdy-gurdy), an instrument which features prominently in their music.

== History ==
Ad Vielle Que Pourra was founded in 1986. Band members included Daniel Thonon, Luc Thonon, Gilles Plante, Alain Leroux, Clement Demers, and Sarah Lesage.

In 1989 the band released their first album on the Green Linnet Records label, including 1989's Ad Vielle Que Pourra, New French Folk Music, in which they used a variety of traditional instruments, including hurdy-gurdy, Bombarde and accordion. In this and their subsequent album Come What May (1991), they included songs created by setting traditional lyrics to new music.

In 1990 and 1991, the band performed at the Winnipeg Folk Festival, and in 1993 at the Edmonton Folk Music Festival. In 1994 they released a third album, Musaïque.

In 1996, the band released the album Ménage à Quatre through Green Linnet's sub-label Xenophile Records. The album was made up of new music in the traditional dance beats and styles from several countries. Instruments included bagpipe, clarinet, guitar, Mandocello and fiddle.

Through 1999, the band continued to perform in Canada and the US. They disbanded in 2000.

== Discography ==
- 1989 Ad Vielle Que Pourra, New French Folk Music
- 1991 Come What May
- 1994 Musaïque
- 1996 Ménage à Quatre
