= Terence Winch =

Irish-American poet, writer and musician

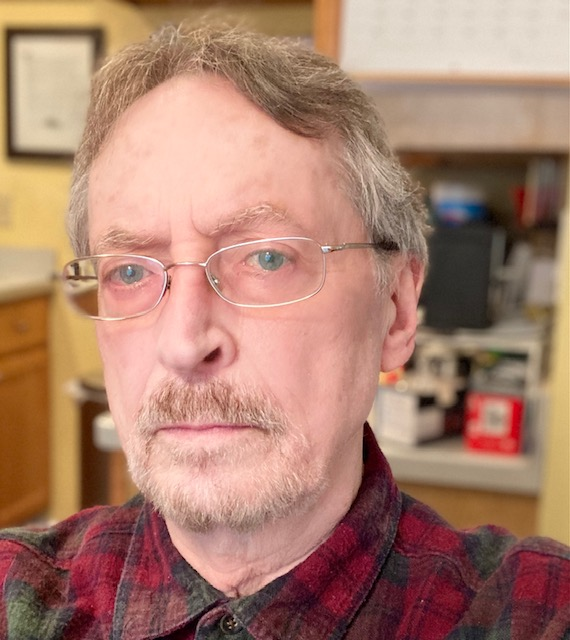
Terence Winch at home in Silver Spring, Maryland, Jan. 2022

Terence Patrick Winch is an Irish-American poet, writer, and musician.

== Biography ==
Winch was born in New York City on November 1, 1945. He grew up in an Irish neighborhood in the Bronx, the child of Irish immigrants. He graduated from Iona College and attended graduate school at Fordham University. In 2014, Iona College (now Iona University) awarded Winch an honorary doctorate.

In 1971, he moved to Washington, D.C., where he became involved with the Mass Transit readings in Dupont Circle. He published the first issue of Mass Transit magazine and co-founded Some of Us Press with Michael Lally and others.

His writing, which shows New York School and other influences, has been widely published and anthologized. Primarily a poet, he has published fiction and non-fiction as well. He was the subject of a profile on National Public Radio's All Things Considered in 1986, and has been featured a number of times on The Writer's Almanac radio program.

From 1975 to 1981, he was a regular book reviewer for The Washington Post and has also been a contributor to The Village Voice, The Washingtonian, The Dictionary of Irish Literature, The Oxford Companion to American Poetry, and other publications. In 1992, Winch was the recipient of a National Endowment for the Arts fellowship in poetry. He has won the American Book Award, the Columbia Book Award, a Gertrude Stein Award for Innovative Writing, and multiple grants from the DC Commission on the Arts and Humanities and the Maryland State Arts Council. Winch worked for the Smithsonian Institution for 24 years, for most of that time as Head of Publications at the National Museum of the American Indian. The Burns Library at Boston College is home to Terence Winch's literary and music archive.

Terence Winch has also played Irish traditional music from childhood, and co-founded the band Celtic Thunder in 1977, writing much of the band's material for its four albums. His best-known composition is "When New York Was Irish," which has been covered by many other artists. Winch's role as an important figure in Irish American music and writing is widely acknowledged.

== Writing ==
- Lehman, David; Winch, Terence (2025-09-02). The Best American Poetry 2025. Simon and Schuster. ISBN 978-1-6680-8058-0.

Winch has published ten books of poems, two story collections, and a young adult novel:

- It Is As If Desire (Hanging Loose Press, 2024)
- That Ship Has Sailed (University of Pittsburgh Press, 2023)
- Seeing-Eye Boy (fiction; Four Windows Press, 2020)
- The Known Universe (Hanging Loose Press, 2018)
- This Way Out (Hanging Loose Press, 2014)
- Lit from Below (Salmon Poetry [Ireland], 2013)
- Falling Out of Bed in a Room with No Floor (Hanging Loose Press, 2011)
- Boy Drinkers (Hanging Loose Press, 2007)
- Irish Musicians/American Friends (Coffee House Press, 1985), American Book Award winner
- The Great Indoors (Story Line Press, 1995), Columbia Book Award winner
- The Drift of Things (The Figures, 2001)
- That Special Place (Hanging Loose, 2004), non-fiction stories
- Contenders (Story Line, 1989), short stories

== Discography ==
As performer, composer:

- Celtic Thunder Live in Concert (Celtic Thunder Music/Free Dirt Records, 2023).
- The Irish Riviera: The Winch Family Band (Cúil Mór Music, 2024).
- This Day Too: Music from Irish America with Terence Winch, Michael Winch, and Jesse Winch (Celtic Thunder Music/Free Dirt Records, 2017), a CD of original and traditional compositions.
- When New York Was Irish: Songs & Tunes by Terence Winch (Celtic Thunder Music, 2007), a CD anthology of compositions by Winch
- Four albums with Celtic Thunder, a traditional Irish group, featuring original music by Winch:
- Celtic Thunder (Green Linnet, 1981)
- The Light of Other Days (Green Linnet, 1989)
- Hard New York Days (Kells, 1995).
- Celtic Thunder Live in Concert (Celtic Thunder Music/Free Dirt Records, 2023)

As producer:

- Creation's Journey: Native American Music (Smithsonian/Folkways 1994)
- Wood That Sings: Indian Fiddle Music of the Americas (Smithsonian/Folkways, 1998)
- Beautiful Beyond: Christian Songs in Native Languages (Smithsonian/Folkways, 2004)
- Pulling Down the Clouds: Contemporary Native Writers Read Their Work (Smithsonian/NMAI, 2007)
- Sounds of Indian Summer: Contemporary Native Music (Smithsonian/NMAI, 2008)
