= Tugnet Ice House =

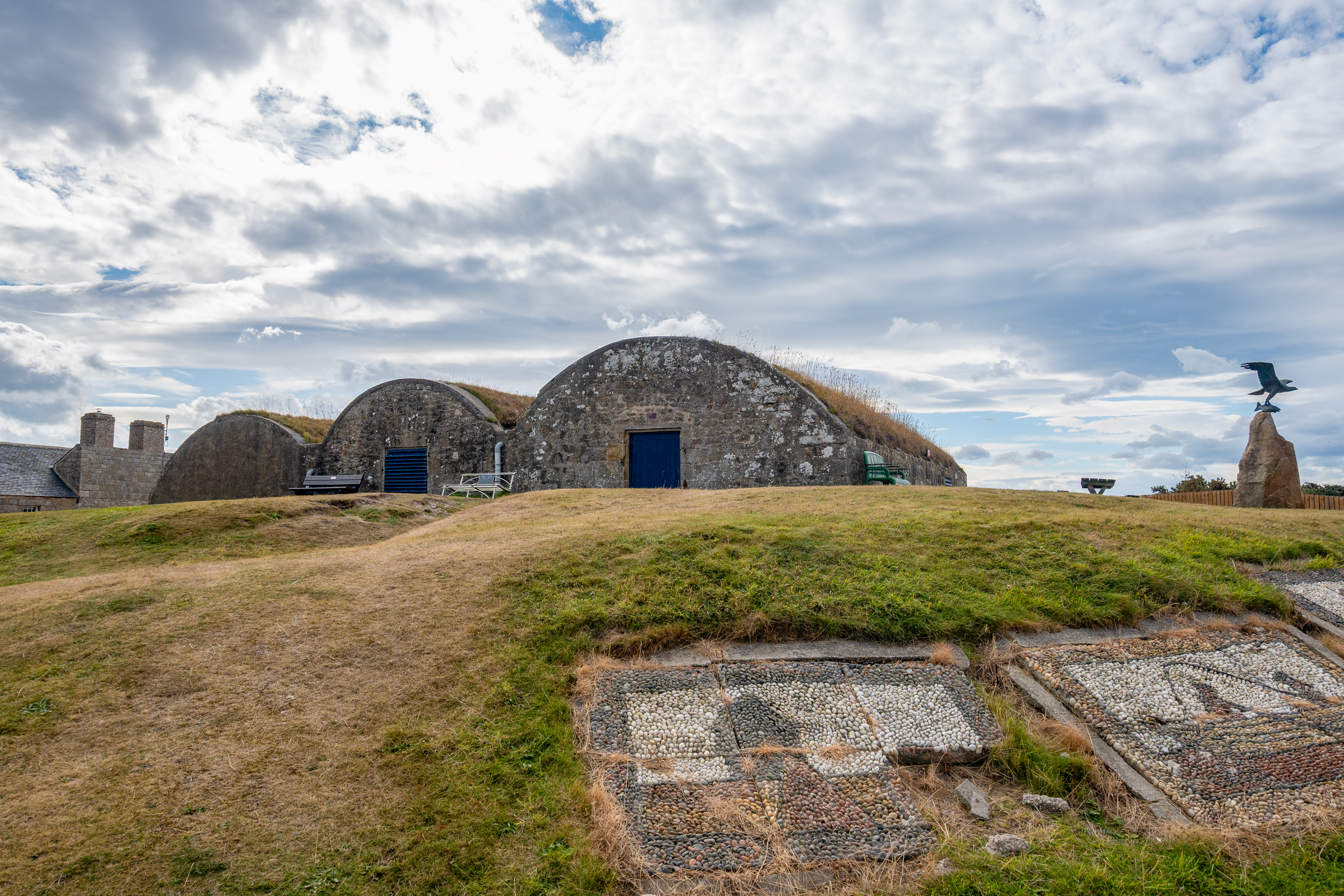
- Interactive map of the Tugnet Ice House area

General information
- Type: Industrial ice house
- Classification: Category A listed building
- Location: Spey Bay, Moray, Scotland
- Coordinates: 57°40′25″N 03°05′37″W
- Completed: 1830
- Owner: Scottish Dolphin Centre

The Tugnet Ice House is a Category A listed building in Spey Bay, Scotland, near the mouth of the River Spey. It was built as an industrial ice house used to store ice for packing salmon from the Spey fishery before it was sent to market. The current structure dates from 1830, having been built to replace an older structure damaged by flooding. It is the largest surviving ice house in the United Kingdom. The building currently forms part of the Scottish Dolphin Centre.

== Description ==
Tugnet is the largest surviving ice house in the United Kingdom. The building consists of three long brick-vaulted chambers, each divided into two compartments, with square three-gabled elevations at either end and curving turf roofs. The chambers are mostly subterranean, with only one third of their volume apparent from the outside. The main entrance leads into the central chamber, from which the remaining five chambers can be accessed; the cobbled floors in each chamber slope towards central drainage sumps; additional higher openings in the north and east elevations served as ice chutes, allowing ice, collected in winter from pools near the shore, to be deposited into the chambers.

== History ==
The ice house was a part of the Tugnet salmon-fishing station that was built up in the late 18th century by the Gordon Estate, which employed some 150 people. Fish would be caught in nets strung across the mouth of the river, cleaned and processed, and then packed in ice to be transported to market in London by a fleet of boats. Several 18th-century buildings survive, including the former fish house, boiler house and the manager's dwelling, but the original ice house was destroyed in a flood in 1829, necessitating the construction of the current building, which was completed in 1830. A lintel above the main entrance, which originally showed the construction date of 1830, was altered in 1977 to show the erroneous date of 1630.

The building remained in use as an ice house until 1968. In 1971 it was designated a Category A listed building. In 1981, it was converted into a museum about local wildlife and the historic salmon fishing and boat building industries. The site was later acquired by the charity Whale and Dolphin Conservation, and forms part of their Scottish Dolphin Centre, which offers tours of the building as well as wildlife watching activities.
