= Celtophile Records =

Sublabel of Green Linnet Records

- Parent company: Green Linnet Records
- Founded: 1997
- Founder: Wendy Newton
- Defunct: 2006
- Status: Defunct
- Genre: Celtic
- Country of origin: United States
- Location: Danbury, Connecticut
- Official website: www.greenlinnet.com

Celtophile Records was a Danbury, Connecticut-based sublabel of Green Linnet Records that specialized in budget-priced compilations of Celtic music. The label was founded in 1997 by Green Linnet owner Wendy Newton.

Celtophile’s catalog included albums such as Celtic Women, Celtic Odyssey, and Celtic Lullaby, featuring artists drawn from the Green Linnet roster, including Altan, Cherish the Ladies, and Lúnasa.

The label ceased operations in 2006 when Wendy Newton sold Green Linnet Records to Digital Music Group. Digital Music Group later sold the manufacturing and distribution rights of Green Linnet’s catalog to Compass Records.
