= After the Morning (Cara Dillon album) =

After The Morning

Studio album by Cara Dillon
- Released: 27 February 2006 (UK); 12 September 2006 (US)
- Recorded: 2005
- Genre: Folk, rock, pop, Celtic
- Length: 55:29
- Label: Rough Trade; Compass Records
- Producer: Sam Lakeman; Mike "Spike" Drake & Sam Lakeman (tracks 6 & 9)

Cara Dillon chronology
Sweet Liberty (2003)	After The Morning (2006)	Hill of Thieves (2009)

Singles from After the Morning
- 1. "Never in a Million Years" Released: 2006; 2. "This Time/I Wish You Well" Released: 2006

Professional ratings
Review scores
Source	Rating
The Irish Times	4/5 stars
Allmusic	3.5/5 stars
Hot Press	8/10 stars
The Scotsman	4/5 stars

After the Morning is the third solo album from folk artist Cara Dillon. It was recorded at their home studio in Frome, Somerset, Mayfair Studios, Kore Studios, Amberville Studios and Sun Street Studios. The strings and brass were recorded in Prague. Similar to her previous albums, After the Morning was produced by Sam Lakeman, her husband and musical partner. Additional production was by Mike 'Spike' Drake, who also mixed the album. It features the singles "Never in a Million Years", and the double A-side of "I Wish You Well" and "This Time".

The lead single, "Never in a Million Years", was a fairly successful radio hit given the folk music genre with which Dillon is associated. It spent six weeks on the BBC Radio 2 playlist, as well as the RTÉ Radio 1 playlist, and was Record of the Week on BBC Radio Ulster. Due to a lack interest on the part of the record label (Rough Trade), the second single, "This Time/I Wish You Well" was cancelled. "This Time" was remixed with additional vocals, electric guitar and percussion for the single. The release date of the double A-side single was originally 31 July 2006, to coincide with Cambridge Folk Festival where Dillon was to perform, but was changed to 14 August 2006 before being cancelled.

== Track listing ==
1. "Never in a Million Years" (Cara Dillon, Sam Lakeman) – 3:49
2. "I Wish You Well" (Dillon, Lakeman) 4:19
3. "Here's a Health" (Dillon, Lakeman) – 4:46
4. "Brockagh Braes" (Traditional) – 5:11
5. "Garden Valley" (Dougie MacLean) – 4:08
6. "October Winds" (Dillon, Lakeman) – 4:02
7. "Bold Jamie" (Dillon, Lakeman) – 5:00
8. "The Streets of Derry" (Traditional) – 4:27
9. "This Time" (Dillon, Lakeman, Katie Marne, Chuck Norman) – 3:59
10. "The Snows They Melt the Soonest" (Traditional) – 4:18
11. "Walls" (Mary Ann Kennedy, Pam Rose, Randy Sharp) – 3:02
12. "Grace" (Dillon, Lakeman) – 3:15

== Personnel ==
- Paul Brady – vocals
- Cara Dillon – arranger, vocals
- Mary Dillon – backing vocals
- Roy Dodds – percussion
- Spike Drake – producer, mixing
- Frank Gallagher – string arrangements
- Cathal Hayden – fiddle
- Sam Lakeman – Producer, Piano, acoustic guitar, organ, percussion
- Simon Lea – drums
- Neill MacColl – guitar, mandolin
- Ben Nicholls – upright bass
- Martin O'Connor – button accordion
- Doug Sax – mastering
- Martin Simpson – guitar

== Chart performance ==
Chart (2006)	Peak position
UK Albums Chart	124
Irish Albums Chart	50
UK Indie Albums Chart	20
