= North (Mary Dillon album) =

Studio album by Mary Dillon
- Released: January 28, 2013 (UK)
- Recorded: 2011–2012
- Genre: Folk, Celtic
- Length: 43:00
- Label: Back Lane Records
- Producer: Mary Dillon; Odhrán Mullan

Mary Dillon chronology
Army Dreamers (2010)	North (2013)

Singles from North
- 1. "John Condon" Released: November 11, 2012

North is the debut solo album by Irish folk singer Mary Dillon, released on January 28, 2013, on Back Lane Records.

== Track listing ==
No.	Title	Writer(s)	Length
1.	"When A Man's In Love"	Traditional; Arranged by: Mary Dillon, Odhrán Mullan	3:49
2.	"Ballyronan Maid"	Traditional; Arranged by: Mary Dillon, Odhrán Mullan	4:05
3.	"The Boatman"	Mary Dillon	4:12
4.	"The Banks of Claudy"	Traditional; Arranged by: Mary Dillon, Odhrán Mullan	4:54
5.	"Edward on Lough Erne Shore"	Traditional; Arranged by: Neil Martin	6:44
6.	"Bleacher Boy"	Traditional; Arranged by: Mary Dillon, Odhrán Mullan	3:12
7.	"John Condon"	Sam Starrett, Richard Laird, Tracey McRory	4:43
8.	"Knocknashee"	Neil Martin, Brendan Graham	4:47
9.	"The Month of January"	Traditional; Arranged by: Mary Dillon, Odhrán Mullan	3:34
10.	"Ard Tí Chuain"	Traditional; Arranged by: Mary Dillon, Odhrán Mullan	3:12

== Personnel ==
- Mary Dillon - vocals
- Odhrán Mullan - piano; shaker; bowed bass, fiddle, pipes, percussion (track 9)
- Eamon McElholm - guitar (tracks 1,3,4,6,9); bass (track 3)
- Ted Ponsonby - guitar, dobro (track 2)
- Eddie O'Donnell - guitar (track 7)
- Neil Martin - cello; low whistle (track 7)
- Brendan Mulholland - flute
- Frank Cassidy - mandola
- Cara Dillon - backing vocals (track 2)
- Clodagh Warnock - fiddle (tracks 4,6)
- Gerdy Thompson - guitar (track 2)
- Tomaí Taylor - bodhrán
- Tom Byrne - accordion

Production

- Mary Dillon - producer
- Odhrán Mullan - producer, engineer, mixing, artwork & design
- Shawn Joseph - mastering
