= Never in a Million Years (Cara Dillon song) =

Single by Cara Dillon

from the album After the Morning
- A-side: "Never in a Million Years"
- Released: 20 February 2006
- Recorded: 2006
- Genre: Folk, pop
- Length: 3:50
- Label: Rough Trade
- Songwriter(s): Cara Dillon, Sam Lakeman
- Producer(s): Sam Lakeman

Cara Dillon singles chronology
"Everywhere" (2004)	"Never in a Million Years" (2006)	"This Time/I Wish You Well" (2006)

"Never In A Million Years" is the lead single release from After The Morning, the third album by Cara Dillon. The single was released as a promo for radio stations in the UK and Ireland. The single was also released exclusively by iTunes as a digital download a week prior to the release of After the Morning, where it climbed to #39 in the iTunes Top 100.

== Track listing ==
1. "Never in a Million Years" (Album version)

== Personnel ==
- Cara Dillon - vocals
- Sam Lakeman – piano, guitar, accordion, percussion, producer
- Simon Lea – drums
- Ben Nicholls – upright bass
- Neil MacColl – guitar, mandolin
- Roy Dodds - percussion
