= Iain MacInnes =

- Origin: Scotland
- Genres: Folk
- Occupation(s): Instrumentalist, radio producer
- Instrument(s): Scottish smallpipe, tin whistle

Iain MacInnes is a Scottish folk musician, currently working as the producer of the BBC Radio Scotland bagpipe music program Pipeline. He was formerly presenter of that program, before taking a one-year sabbatical in 2002 to write a book on piping in the 20th century. It airs on BBC Radio Scotland at 21:05 GMT on Saturdays.

He has played the Scottish smallpipes and whistles in a number of folk bands including The Tannahill Weavers, Smalltalk, Ossian, and his own band. He has released a solo CD on Greentrax records called Tryst.

He also writes for the pipes | drums magazine.

== Discography ==
- Canterach – Canterach (2001, Lochshore, LDL 1303)
- Iain MacInnes – Tryst (1999, Greentrax, CDTRAX 182)
- Ossian – The Carrying Stream (1997, Greentrax, CDTRAX 127)
- Various – Grand Concert of Scottish Piping (1996, Greentrax, CDTRAX 110)
- Smalltalk – Smalltalk (1994, Greentrax, CDTRAX 079)
