= Kornog =

Breton folk music band

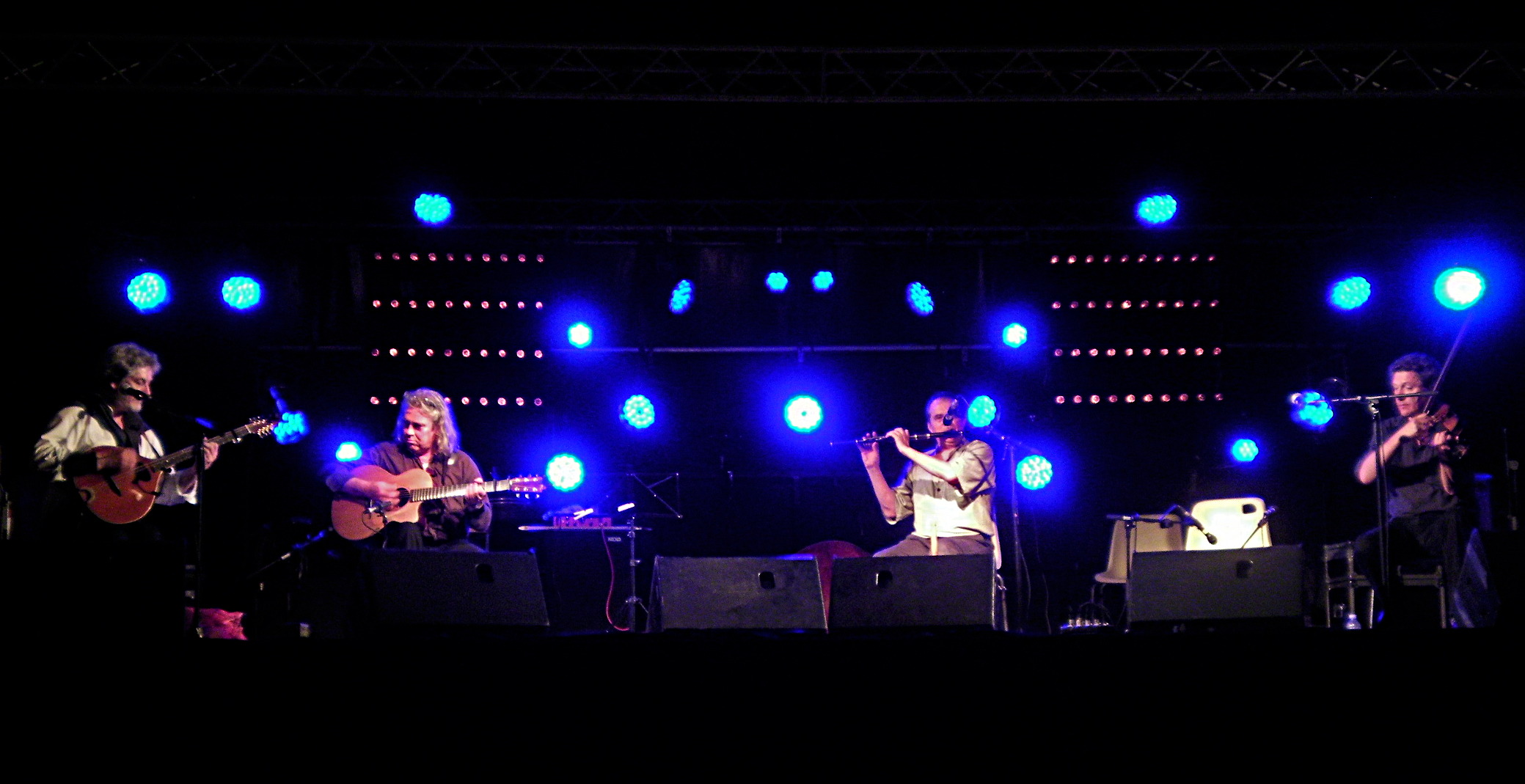

Background information
- Origin: Brittany
- Genres: Breton folk music
- Years active: 1981–1987; 1999–2006
- Labels: Green Linnet, Keltia Musique, An Naer
- Past members: Jamie McMenemy: Christian Lemaitre; Jean-Michel Veillon; Soïg Siberil; Gilles Le Bigot; Nicolas Quemener

Kornog ("The West Wind" in Breton) is a Breton folk music band formed in 1980 which plays traditional Breton or Celtic tunes and compositions. It was one of the most influential Celtic groups of the 1980s and one of the only representatives of Breton music to perform in the United States.

== Overview ==
Unusual for Breton groups, the band's approach is intended for listening and not specifically for the traditional Fest Noz dance circuit, and contains the Scots ballads of bouzouki and mandolin player Jamie McMenemy. The group was active from 1982 to 1987, then reunited again in 1999 and in 2000 released a new CD, Korong.

The group still plays together occasionally, and some of the members play together regularly in duo formats (2010 has seen the first tour of duo Siberil-McMenemy), although for the most part they have been superseded by the offshoot group Pennoù Skoulm.

Most of the members of Kornog are in the band Pennoù Skoulm. Like Kornog, Pennoù Skoulm has likewise existed in two separate iterations, first active from 1982 to 1990, releasing their first recording in 1985, and then regrouping in 2008 and releasing their newest recording Trinkañ in 2009. Pennoù Skoulm remains active as a performing group, occasionally joined by Irish musician Andy Irvine.

Kornog's final performance (to date) was in 2006.

== Members ==
Scotsman Jamie McMenemy (vocals, bouzouki, mandolin, cittern) had previously toured and recorded with the Battlefield Band. While touring Brittany he encountered a traditional fest noz dance music performance and was immediately enthralled. He relocated to Brittany in 1979. Two years later, he recorded a solo album The Road to Kerrigouarch, joined by guitarist Soïg Siberil and violinist Christian Lemaitre. Shortly thereafter Kornog was formed.

Christian Lemaitre hails from the large Breton expatriate community in Paris. He began playing fiddle in Paris before moving to Brittany, his ancestral home. Following Kornog's initial breakup, Lemaitre also performed and recorded with the noted Fest-Noz group Storvan. He has also toured and recorded several times with fiddlers Kevin Burke and Johnny Cunningham as Celtic Fiddle Festival, mostly reworking material from Kornog and Storvan. The latest Kornog release, Korong, also featured Jacky Molard on violin and octave-violin. Molard is a regular member of Pennoù Skoulm.

Wooden flute player Jean-Michel Veillon was one of the first musicians to use the wooden flute to play Breton music. Playing the bombard from the age of eleven, he taught himself to play the wooden flute in 1977 and is now considered one of the world’s foremost musicians playing this instrument. Veillon has recorded and performed in a duo with Breton guitarist Yvon Riou and has also continued to record as a soloist. His 1993 album, E Koat Nizon, was the first album devoted to Breton music played on the wooden transverse flute. A similar album, Er Pasker, followed in 1999.

Soïg Siberil, already well known for his work with the group Gwerz (band), was the original guitarist for Kornog. He left Kornog in 1986 after recording Ar Seizh Avel to pursue a highly successful solo career with a number of well-received recordings. On Kornog IV and on the group's 1987 tours, guitarist Gilles Le Bigot from the legendary band Skolvan stepped in to handle the guitar duties. The newest guitarist to play with the group, and also replacing Siberil in Pennou Skoulm, is Nicolas Quemener. He is also a member of the Fest Noz group Skeduz. Quemener grew up in Angers, France and studied percussion in the National School of Music.

== Discography ==
=== Kornog ===
- 1983: Kornog
- 1984: Premiere: Live in Minneapolis
- 1985: Ar Seizh Avel
- 1987: Kornog IV
- 2000: Korong

=== Pennoù Skoulm ===
- 1985: Pennoù Skoulm
- 2009: Trinkañ
