= The Tannahill Weavers =

Scottish traditional music group

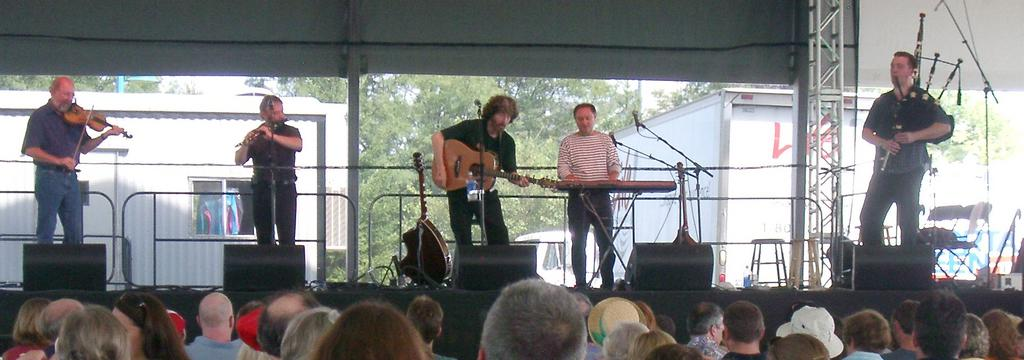

Background information
- Origin: Paisley, Renfrewshire, Scotland
- Genre: Scottish traditional
- Years active: 1968–present
- Labels: Compass, Green Linnet, Plant Life
- Members: Roy Gullane; Phil Smillie; Malcolm Bushby; Iain MacGillivray
- Past members: Lorne MacDougall; John Martin; Colin Melville; Leslie Wilson; Alan MacLeod; Bill Bourne; Dougie MacLean; Duncan J. Nicholson; Struan Thorpe; Gordon Duncan; Hudson Swan; Iain MacInnes; Kenny Forsyth; Mike Ward; Ross Kennedy; Stuart Morison; John Cassidy; Willie Beaton; David Shaw; Willie Beag; Stuart McKay; Neil Doherty; Jim McGowan
- Website: www.tannahillweavers.com

The Tannahill Weavers are a traditional Scottish music musical group. They released their first album, Are Ye Sleeping Maggie, in 1976, and were one of the first popular bands to incorporate the Great Highland Bagpipe in an ensemble setting. In doing so, they helped change the sound of Scottish traditional music. In 2011, the band were inducted into the Scottish Traditional Music Hall of Fame.

The band was formed in 1968 and practised in a back room of the McKay family's rented council house at 41 St. Ninian's Road, Hunterhill, Paisley. The band first performed at St. Peter's Folk Club, Glenburn, Paisley which was run by Pat Doherty, father of Weavers' founding member Neil Doherty.

As of 2021, they continue to tour and release new recordings. They are named after Scottish poet Robert Tannahill, known as the 'Weaver Poet,' and have recorded several of his songs.

In 2022 Roy Gullane published an autobiography entitled Goulash Soup and Chips: The Reminiscences and Occasional Rantings of an Aging Folk Singer, which includes numerous anecdotes about The Tannahill Weavers' 50-plus-year touring history.

== Members ==
The current members of the band are:

- Roy Gullane (guitar, vocals)
- Phil Smillie (flute, tin whistles, bodhrán, vocals)
- Malcolm Bushby (fiddle)
- Iain MacGillivray (Highland bagpipes, fiddle, Scottish smallpipes, tin whistle)

Past members have included:

- Lorne MacDougall (Highland bagpipes, Scottish smallpipes, tin whistle)
- John Martin (fiddle, vocals)
- Colin Melville (Highland bagpipes, Scottish smallpipes, tin whistles)
- Leslie Wilson (bouzouki, keyboards, bass pedals, guitar, vocals)
- Alan MacLeod (Highland bagpipes, tin whistles, mandola, organ, vocals)
- Bill Bourne (vocals, bouzouki, guitar, electric guitar, fiddle, keyboards, bass pedals)
- Dougie MacLean (fiddle, mandolin, vocals, guitar, tenor banjo)
- Duncan J. Nicholson (Highland bagpipes, Scottish smallpipes, tin whistles)
- Struan Thorpe (Highland bagpipes, Scottish smallpipes, flute, tin whistles, guitar)
- Gordon Duncan (Highland bagpipes, tin whistles)
- Hudson Swan (bouzouki, vocals, fiddle, glockenspiel, mandolin)
- Iain MacInnes (Highland bagpipes, Scottish smallpipes, tin whistles, vocals)
- Kenny Forsyth (Highland bagpipes, Scottish smallpipes, tin whistles)
- Mike Ward (fiddle, guitar, vocals)
- Ross Kennedy (bouzouki, fiddle, bass pedals, vocals)
- Stuart Morison (fiddles, bones, guitar)
- Willie Beaton (fiddle, vocals)
- David Shaw (guitar, bass guitar)
- Willie Beag (fiddle)
- John Cassidy (whistles, vocals) - founding member
- Stuart McKay (vocals, guitar, penny whistle) - founding member
- Neil Doherty (vocals, guitar, mandolin, penny whistle) - founding member
- Jim McGowan (vocals) - founding member

== Discography ==
=== Albums ===
- Are Ye Sleeping Maggie (1976)
- The Old Woman's Dance (1978)
- The Tannahill Weavers (1979)
- Tannahill Weavers IV (1981)
- Passage (1984)
- Land of Light (1986)
- Dancing Feet (1987)
- Best of the Tannahill Weavers 1979 - 1989 (1989)
- Cullen Bay (1990)
- The Mermaid's Song (1992)
- Capernaum (1994)
- Leaving St. Kilda (1996)
- The Tannahill Weavers Collection: Choice Cuts 1987-1996 (1997)
- Epona (1998)
- Alchemy (2000)
- Arnish Light (2003)
- Live and In Session (2006)
- Òrach (2018)

=== Contributing artists ===
- The Rough Guide to Scottish Music (1996)
