= Celtic Thunder (United States) =

Irish music group

Celtic Thunder is a traditional Irish music group founded in the United States in 1977.

Celtic Thunder was co-founded by Terence Winch, Jesse Winch, Linda Hickman, Steve Hickman, and Nita Conley. The group played its first gig in May 1977 at the Harp Pub in Baltimore, and went on to become one of the most influential traditional music groups in the United States. Called "a great Irish band" by the Village Voice and "one of the best Irish folk acts in America" by The Washington Post, Celtic Thunder has released three albums over the years. In 1981 they released their self-titled album. The band's second CD, The Light of Other Days, which features Terence Winch’s song "When New York Was Irish", won the NAIRD INDIE award for Best Celtic Album in 1989. In addition to touring Ireland and playing innumerable concerts, ceilis, and pubs in the U.S., Celtic Thunder also performed at the White House twice during the Clinton administration.

A compilation of Terence Winch's compositions, featuring many of Celtic Thunder's best-known songs and tunes, called When New York Was Irish, has been released.
