= Christian Lemaitre =

French musician

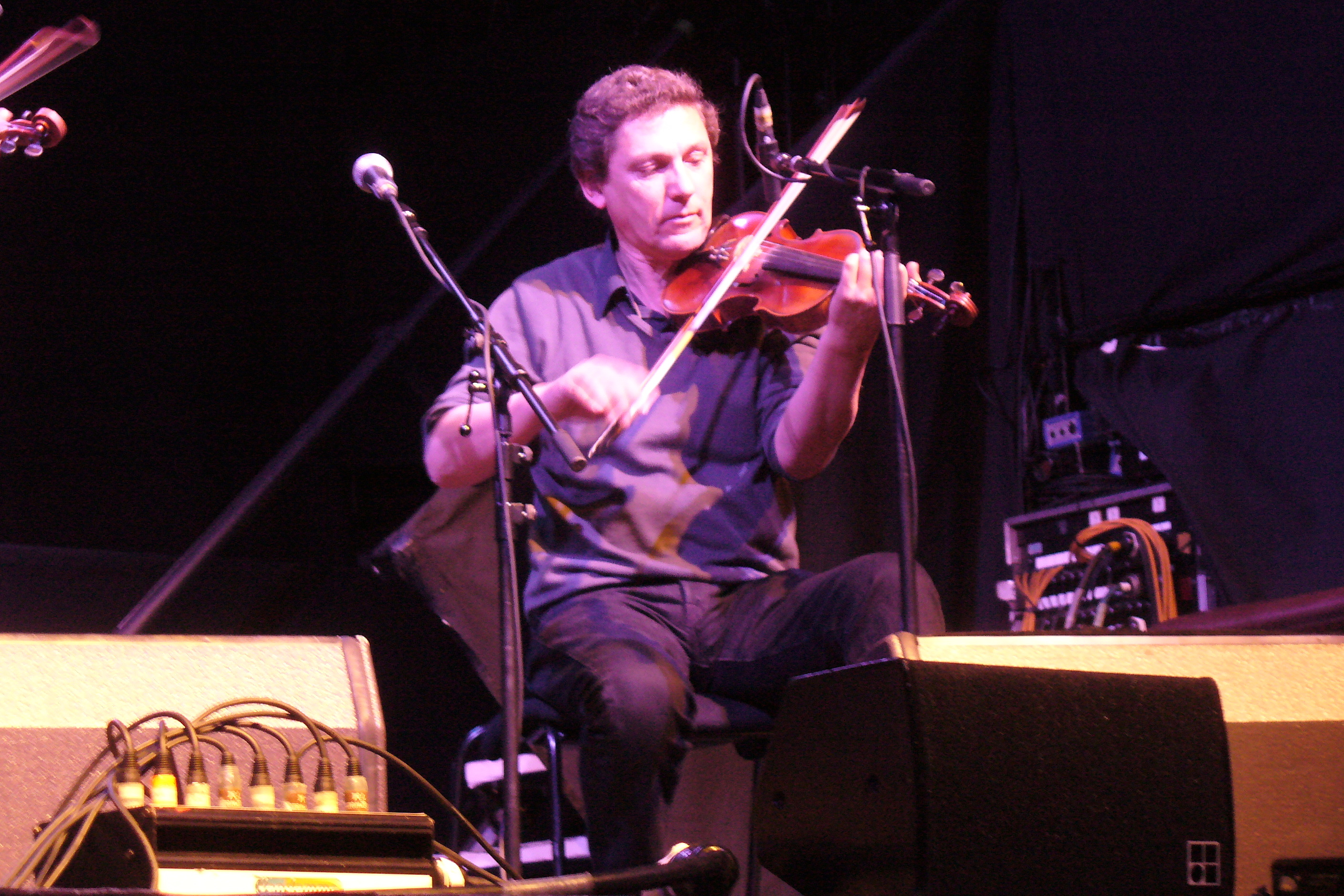
Lemaitre in 2010

Christian Lemaitre is a French musician specialising in the folk Music of Brittany, with an emphasis on Breton traditional fiddle music. He learned the instrument in his teens in Paris and later moved to Brittany. He joined Kornog in 1981 and later formed a Breton dance-band. He has also performed for many years with fiddlers Kevin Burke and the late Johnny Cunningham in Celtic Fiddle Festival.
