= Niamh Parsons =

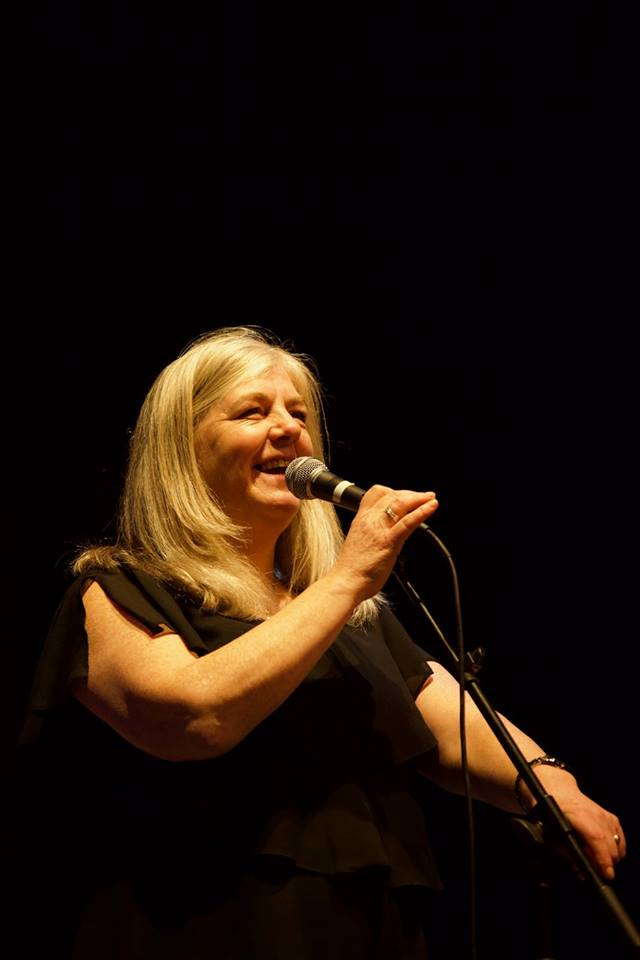
Niamh Parsons in Dublin.

Niamh Parsons (born in Dublin, Ireland) is a singer of contemporary and traditional Irish music.

== Career ==
Niamh Parsons started her professional career in 1990, in Belfast. Having been singing at sessions around Dublin, Niamh first joined the band Killera from 1984 to 1989. Joining her ex-husband Dee with their band the Loose Connections in 1990, Parsons released two CDs with this band. Since then she has toured extensively in Europe and the US with the Loose Connections, the traditional group Arcady and with her partner Dublin guitarist Graham Dunne, with whom she has been playing since 1999. She has also appeared solo at many festivals and venues in Ireland, USA, Italy, Denmark, the Netherlands, Spain, France, Germany, Switzerland, Austria, Belgium, Japan and Great Britain.

She was asked to play before President Clinton and Irish Prime Minister Bertie Ahern in Capitol Hill, Washington. She has also made several appearances on the Irish TV station RTÉ. She has released eight albums since 1992. 'In My Prime' was nominated for the 2002 BBC Folk Awards, as was the song 'Bonny Woodhall' and Niamh herself nominated as Singer of the year in the same year. Her 2002 album Heart's Desire won the 2003 Association for Independent Music award.

Niamh is also on the Executive of the Musicians Union of Ireland. www.mui.ie

== Discography ==
- Loosely Connected with the Loose Connections (Greentrax, 1992)
- Many Happy Returns ARCADY - (Dara/Shanachie, 1994)
- Loosen Up with the Loose Connections (Green Linnet, 1997)
- Blackbirds and Thrushes (Green Linnet, 1999)
- In My Prime with Graham Dunne (Green Linnet, 2000)
- Heart's Desire with Graham Dunne (Green Linnet, 2002)
- Live at Fylde with Graham Dunne (2005)
- The Old Simplicity with Graham Dunne (Green Linnet, 2006)
- Kind Providence with Graham Dunne (2016)
- So Here's to You Live with Graham Dunne (2021)
