= Spey Bay =

Coordinates: 57°40′21″N 3°05′12″W

Spey Bay: Scottish Gaelic: Inbhir Spè
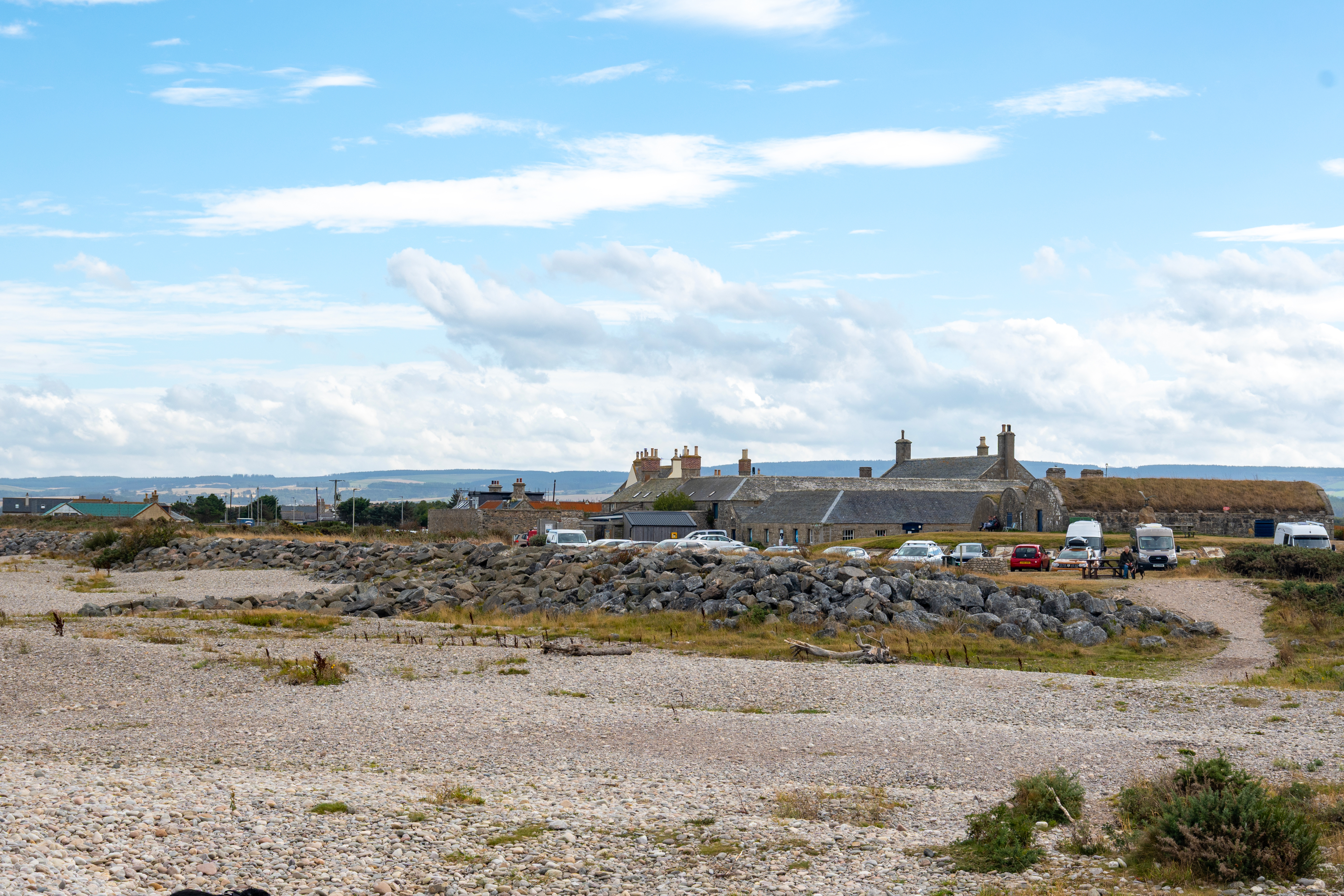

- Location within Moray
- OS grid reference: NJ354648
- Council area: Moray
- Lieutenancy area: Banffshire
- Country: Scotland
- Sovereign state: United Kingdom
- Post town: FOCHABERS
- Postcode district: IV32
- Police: Scotland
- Fire: Scottish
- Ambulance: Scottish
- UK Parliament: Moray
- Scottish Parliament: Moray

Spey Bay (Scottish Gaelic: Inbhir Spè) is a small settlement in Moray, Scotland. It is situated at the eastern side of the mouth of the River Spey on the coast of the Moray Firth between the village of Kingston on the western side of the Spey, and the fishing port of Buckie to the east.

== Tourist attractions ==
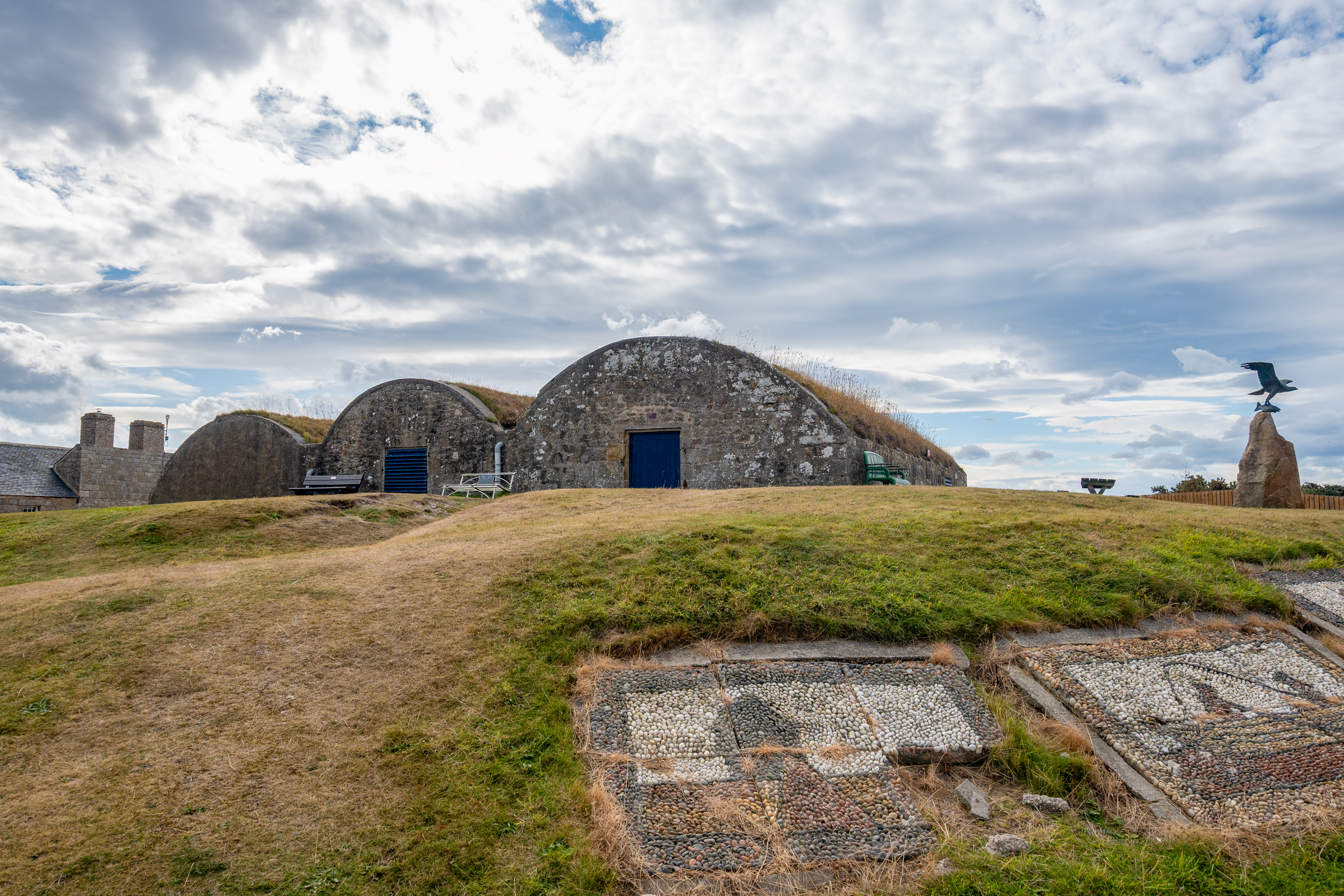
The Tugnet Ice House, osprey sculpture to the right

- Spey Bay's origins are in salmon fishing on the Spey. The fishing station is no longer operational but the Tugnet Ice House - claimed to be the largest in Scotland - remains as a tourist attraction.
- A part of the former fishing station has been converted to provide the Moray Firth Wildlife Centre, operated by the Whale and Dolphin Conservation Society. Famed for the dolphins, the centre is within a wildlife haven that is also home to ospreys, grey and harbour seals, otters, wildfowl and waders. It is part of a 450 ha nature reserve which forms part of the largest vegetated shingle habitat in Scotland.
- The Speyside Way long-distance footpath passes through Spey Bay.
- The Spey Bay Golf Club along the side of the Speyside Way long-distance footpath, recently purchased by linksDAO, a decentralised autonomous organisation.
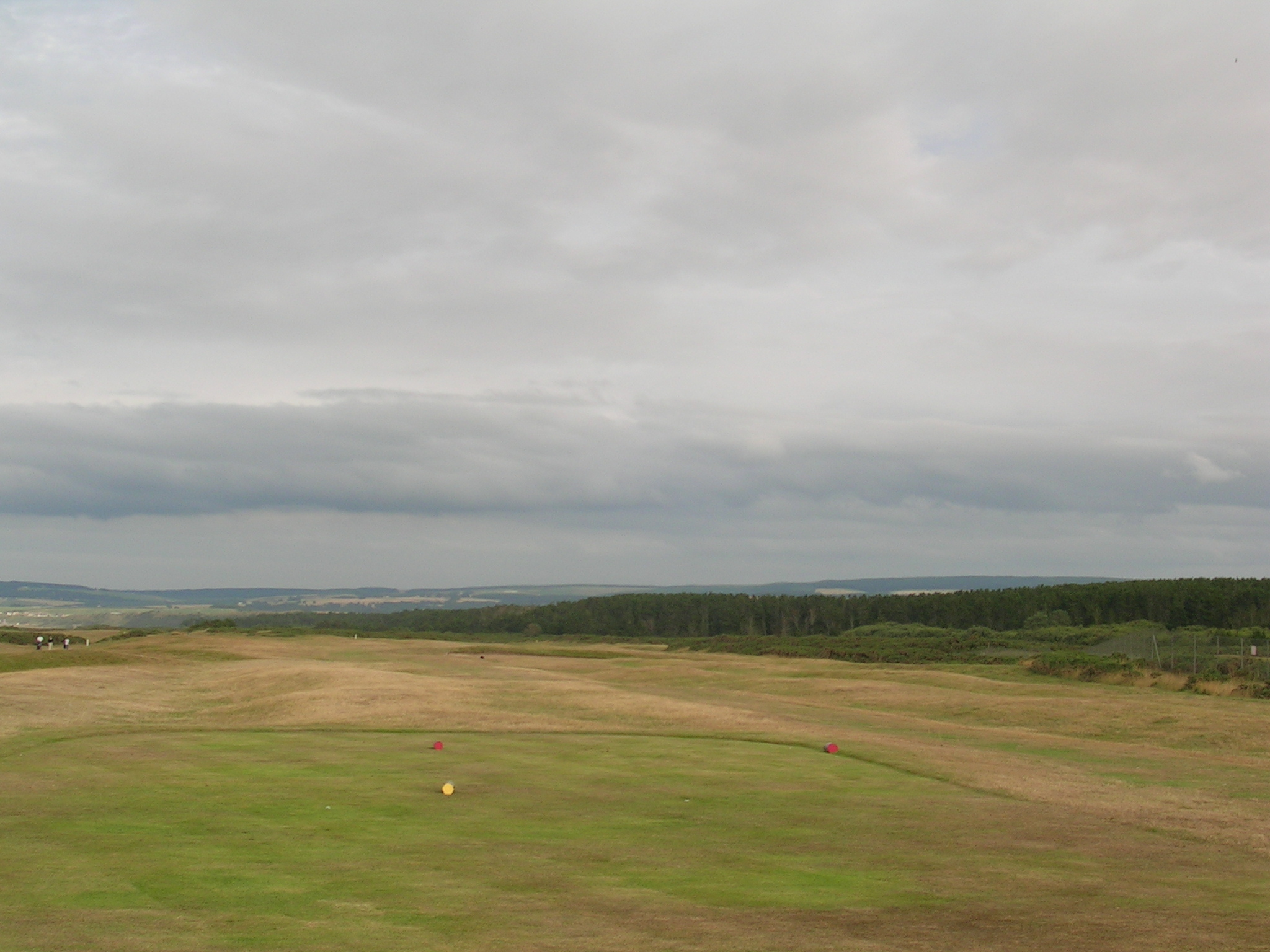
1st fairway at Spey Bay Golf Club

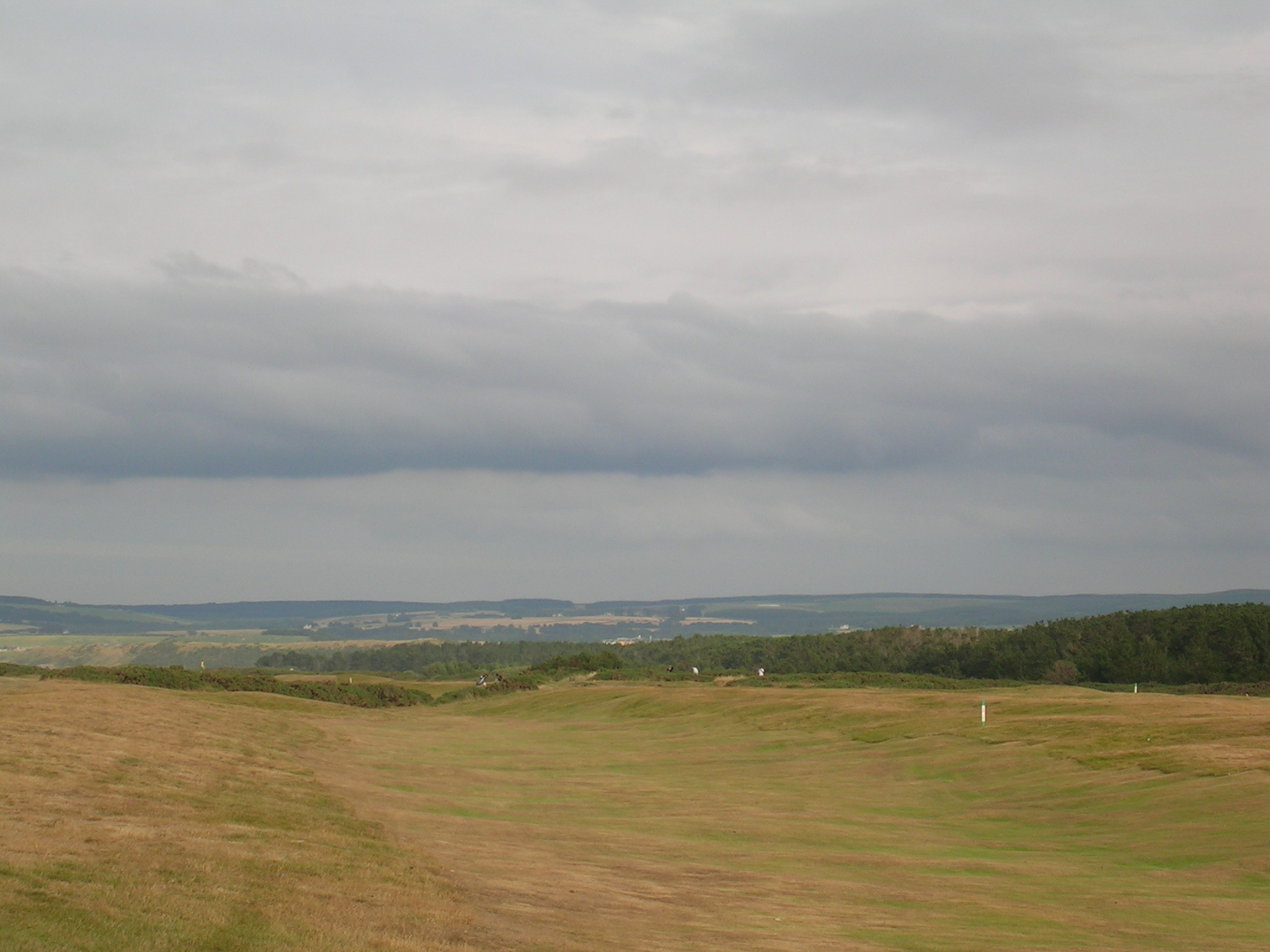
18th fairway at Spey Bay Golf Club

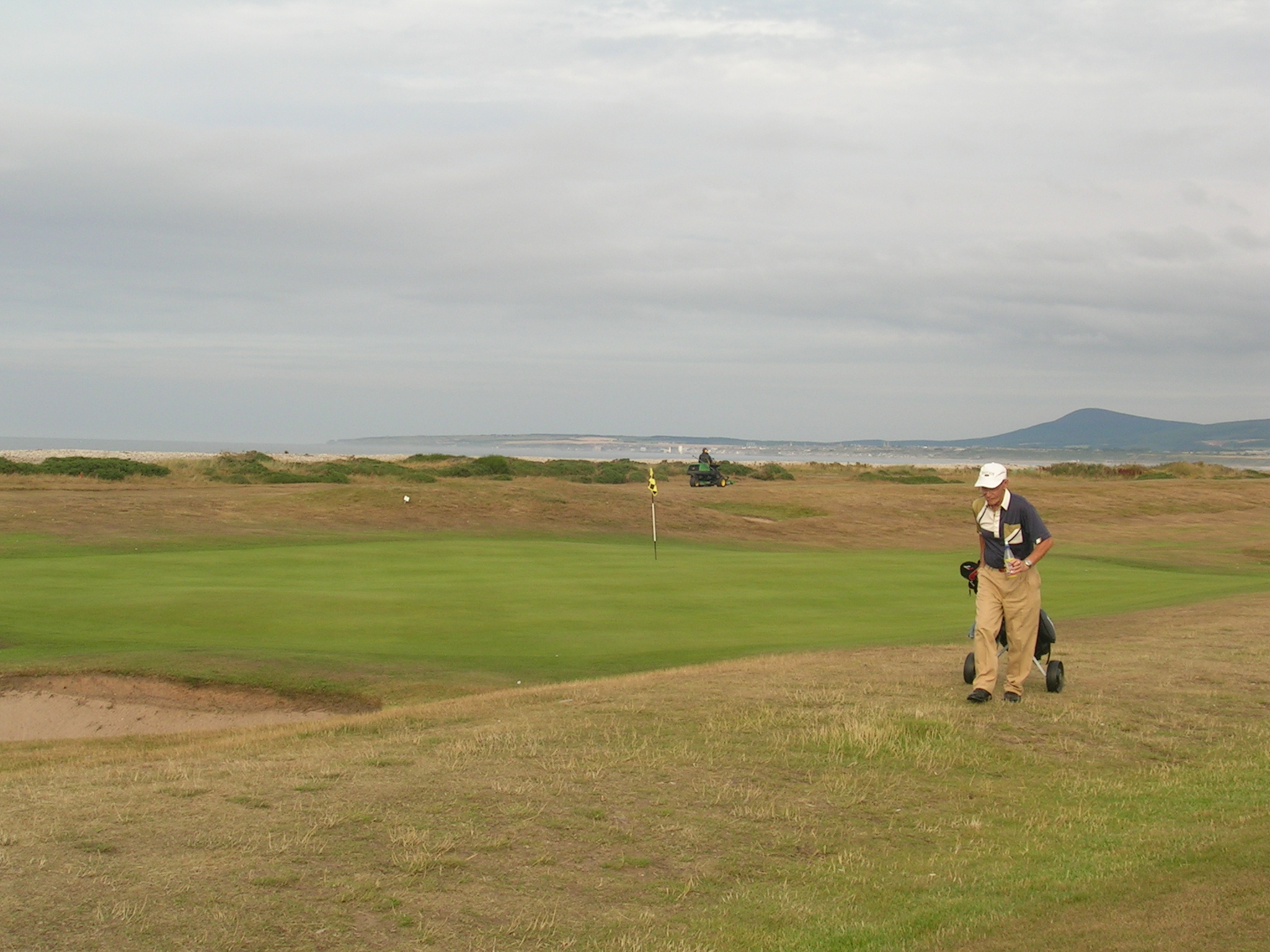
18th green at Spey Bay Golf Club

== See also ==
- Spey Bay railway station
