= Tamalin (band) =

Tamalin is a family-based band from west Belfast, Northern Ireland, who originally began playing Irish traditional music in the early 1980s under the name The McSherrys. Toward the end of the 1980s they were joined by long term friend Kevin Dorris on bouzouki and subsequently changed the name of the group to Tamalin.

In the early 1990s the band became close friends with legendary drummer and percussionist Dave Early who had settled in Belfast and was playing with Mary Black. When not touring with Mary, Dave worked closely with Tamalin playing concerts and experimenting in the studio. An album was shaping and in July 1997 Rhythm and Rhyme was released on the Grapevine label.

In October 1996 Dave Early died in a car accident outside Dublin and never saw the release of the band's debut album. John McSherry had a parallel career for many years, being a member of Donal Lunny's Coolfin as well as co-founding the band Lúnasa along with Michael McGoldrick.

In 2016 The McSherrys featured in Season 2 (episode 6) of the TG4 series ‘Ceol an Chlann’

== Members ==
- Tiona McSherry: flute, vocals
- John McSherry: Uilleann pipes, whistles
- Joanne McSherry: fiddle
- Paul McSherry: guitar
- Kevin Dorris: bouzouki

== Discography ==
- 5th St Patricks day Celebration (1994)
- Rhythm and Rhyme (1997)

=== Compilations ===
- Now and in time to be (1997)
- The meeting of the waters: W. B. Yeats (1997)
- Intuition (1997)
- Forever Celtic (1997)
- Celtic Heartbeat (1999)
- Celtic Waves (2002)
