= Green Linnet Records =

American independent record label

- Parent company: Compass Records
- Founded: 1973
- Founder: Lisa Null; Patrick Sky
- Distributor: Ryko Distribution
- Genre: Celtic
- Country of origin: U.S.
- Location: Nashville, Tennessee

Green Linnet Records was an American independent record label that specialized in Celtic music. Founded by Lisa Null and Patrick Sky as Innisfree Records in 1973, the label was initially based in Null's house in New Canaan, Connecticut. In 1975 the label became Innisfree/Green Linnet and Wendy Newton joined Null and Sky as operating officer. In 1976 Newton took over control of the now Green Linnet label, became its sole owner in 1978, and moved it to Danbury, Connecticut in 1985. Newton's love of Irish music had been sparked during a visit to Ireland where she heard traditional music for the first time in a small pub in County Clare.

== Artists and imprints ==
Green Linnet signed Altan, Capercaillie, The Tannahill Weavers and many other significant bands and musicians. From its founding until its sale in 2006 Green Linnet was one of the most influential Celtic music labels, releasing hundreds of albums by a wide range of Irish, Scottish, Breton, Galician and Irish-American musicians. In 1992 a subsidiary called Xenophile Records was added to feature world music from Madagascar, Nigeria, Cuba and other countries. In 1997 Green Linnet launched Celtophile Records to offer budget-priced compilations. There was also a Green Linnet/Redbird series that featured singer-songwriters.

== Artist lawsuit and legacy ==
In 2002 Green Linnet was sued for unpaid royalties by bands Cherish the Ladies and Altan and artists Mick Moloney, Joanie Madden and Eileen Ivers. Most artists were paid and most claims were settled in 2006. But there remain a number of outstanding claims that have yet to be resolved, clouding the legacy left behind by Green Linnet and its then-owner Wendy Newton. Bands have been known to leave the label because of poor management from the label, including Wolfstone and Lúnasa.

In May 2006 Newton sold the label to the Digital Music Group, an aggregator of downloadable music. DMG in turn sold the rights to manufacture and distribute Green Linnet and Xenophile physical compact discs to Compass Records. Both the Green Linnet and Xenophile catalogs remain available through Compass.

== Label name ==
A linnet is a red-breasted song bird known for its trills and twitters. However, in the Irish rebel song tradition, the name "Green Linnet" has a specific meaning. It was the code name for Napoleon Bonaparte who they hoped would break the chains of British rule. Indeed, in the early 19th century the Society of United Irishmen (the Irish independence organization led by Theobald Wolfe Tone and Robert Emmet), allied themselves with France against Britain, but as history would prove, to no effect. The songs, however, were passed down to latter generations.

== Roster ==
- 3 Way Street
- Ad Vielle Que Pourra
- Altan
- Joe Burke
- Kevin Burke
- [Buttons & Bows]
- Dennis Cahill
- Capercaillie
- Liz Carroll
- Celtic Fiddle Festival
- Celtic Thunder
- Cherish the Ladies
- Jack Coen
- Johnny B. Connolly
- Seamus Connolly
- Brian Conway
- Michael Cooney
- Terry Corcoran
- Kevin Crawford
- Johnny Cunningham
- Marty Cutler
- Deanta
- Tony DeMarco
- Joe Derrane
- Oisín Mac Diarmada
- Tom Doherty
- Seamus Ennis
- Ensemble Choral Du Bout Du Monde
- Fairport Convention
- John Faulkner
- Ffynnon
- Green Fields of America
- Martin Hayes
- The House Band
- Irish Tradition
- Andy Irvine
- Eileen Ivers
- Ron Kavana
- Brian Keane
- James Keane
- Jimmy Keane
- Pat Kilbride
- Kips Bay
- Kornog
- Donna Long
- Jez Lowe and the Bad Pennies
- Lunasa
- Manus Lunny
- Joanie Madden
- Debby McClatchy
- Billy McComiskey
- Manus McGuire
- Susan McKeown
- Matt Molloy
- Mick Moloney
- Pan Morrigan
- Moving Cloud
- Martin Mulhaire
- Brendan Mulvihill
- Paddy O'Brien
- Robbie O'Connell
- Eugene O'Donnell
- Jerry O'Sullivan
- Old Blind Dogs
- Orealis
- Niamh Parsons
- Rare Air
- Red Clay Ramblers
- Reeltime
- Relativity
- Tommy Sands
- Sileas
- Daithi Sproule
- Andy M. Stewart
- Patrick Street
- The Tannahill Weavers
- Teada
- Touchstone
- Trian
- The Tulla Céilí Band
- Brooks Williams
- John Williams
- Wolfstone

== See also ==
- List of record labels
- Compass Records
- Xenophile Records
- Celtophile Records
