= The Dubliners discography =

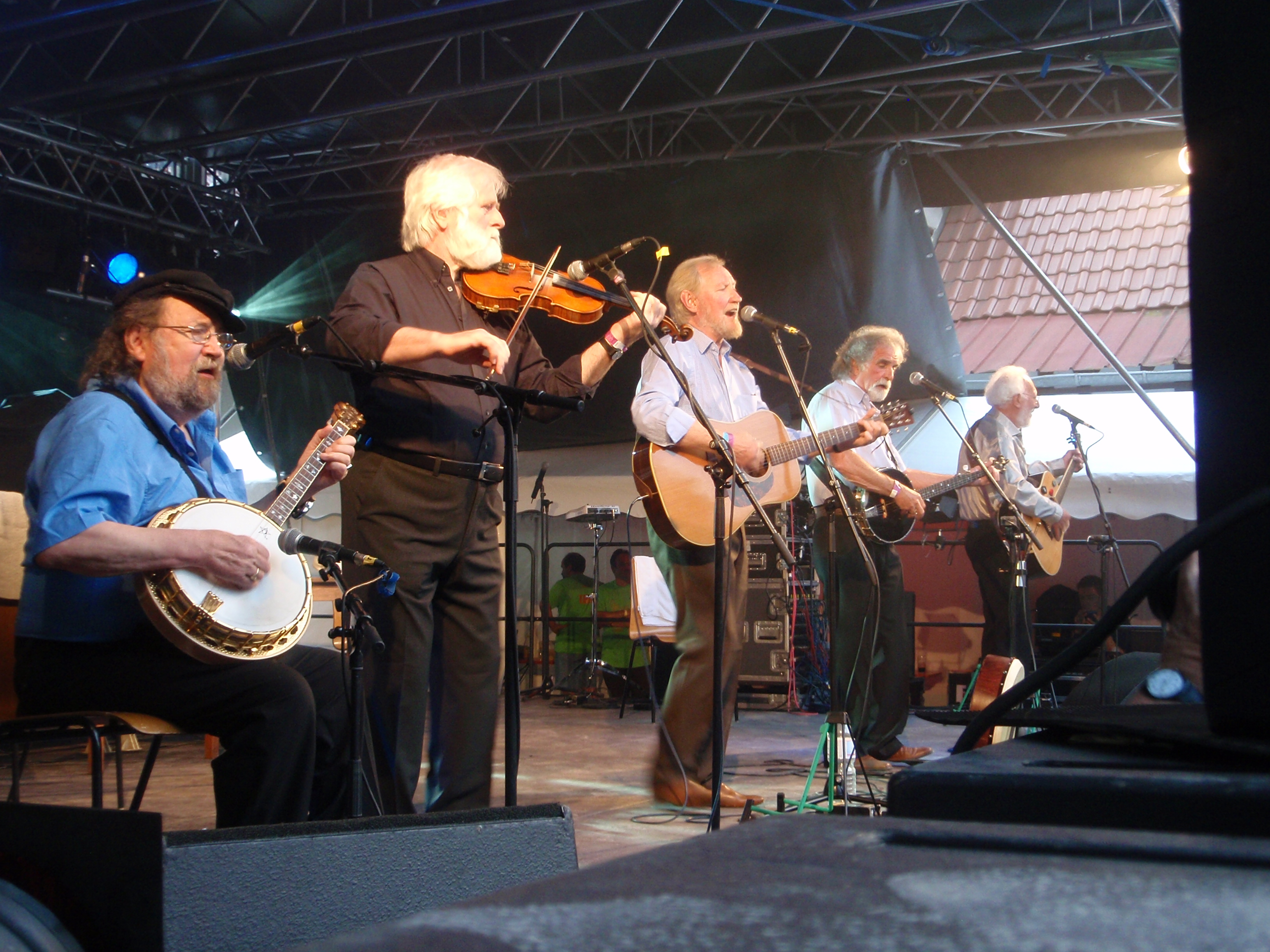
- The Dubliners performing in Germany in 2010
- Studio albums: 17
- Live albums: 13
- Compilation albums: 26
- Singles: 23
- Video albums: 1
- Music videos: 8
- Misc. Appearances: 7
- Bootleg albums: 1

The discography of The Dubliners, an Irish folk band with record sales in excess of 30 million. Their discography consists of nineteen studio albums, twenty-four compilation albums, twenty-three singles and a number of other appearances. The Dubliners as of 2019 now tour under the name The Dublin Legends.

== Studio albums ==
Year	Album details	Peak chart positions	
Year	Album details	IRL	UK
1967	A Drop of the Hard Stuff: Label: Major Minor; Formats: CD, Cassette, LP	1	5
1967	More of the Hard Stuff: Label: Major Minor; Formats: CD, Cassette, LP	3	8
1968	Drinkin' and Courtin': Label: Major Minor; Formats: CD, Cassette, LP	5	31
1968	At It Again: Label: Major Minor; Formats: CD, Cassette, LP	—	—
1969	At Home with The Dubliners: Label: EMI-Columbia; Formats: CD, Cassette, LP	—	—
1970	Revolution: Label: EMI/Columbia; Formats: CD, Cassette, LP	10	—
1972	Double Dubliners: Label: EMI; Formats: CD, Cassette, LP	10	—
1973	Plain and Simple: Label: Polydor; Formats: CD, Cassette, LP	—	—
1975	Now: Label: Polydor; Formats: CD, Cassette, LP	—	—
1976	A Parcel of Rogues: Label: Polydor; Formats: CD, Cassette, LP	—	—
1977	15 Years On: Label: CHYME; Formats: CD, Cassette, LP	—	—
1979	Together Again: Label: CHYME/Polydor; Formats: CD, Cassette, LP	—	—
1983	Prodigal Sons: Label: Polydor; Formats: CD, Cassette	—	—
1987	25 Years Celebration: Label: Polydor; Formats: CD, Cassette	1	43
1988	The Dubliner's Dublin: Label: Castle Communications; Formats: CD, Cassette	—	—
1992	30 Years A-Greying: Label: Celtic Collections; Formats: CD, Cassette	5	—
1996	Further Along: Label: Baycourt; Formats: CD, Cassette	20	—

== Live albums ==
- No Irish Album Chart Archive until 2003.

Year	Album details	Peak chart positions
Year	Album details	IRL
1964	The Dubliners: Label: Transatlantic; Formats: CD, Cassette, LP	—
1965	In Concert: Label: Castle; Formats: Vinyl	—
1969	Live at the Albert Hall: Label: Major Minor; Formats: Vinyl	—
1974	Live: Label: Polydor Records; Formats: Vinyl	—
1977	Live at Montreux: Label: Intercord; Formats: Vinyl	—
1985	Live in Carre: Label: Polydor; Formats: Vinyl	—
1997	Alive Alive-O: Label: Baycourt Records; Formats: CD, Cassette	—
1999	A Night Out With The Dubliners: Label: Celtic Collections; Formats: CD, Cassette	—
2002	Live from the Gaiety: Label: Celtic Collections; Formats: CD, Cassette	28
2006	Live at Vicar Street: Label: Celtic Collections; Formats: CD, Cassette	53
2008	The Late Late Show Tribute: Label: RTÉ; Formats: CD, Digital DVD	31
2009	A Time to Remember: Label: Celtic Airs; Formats: CD,	—
2014	An Evening With The Dublin Legends: Live In Vienna: Label: Blue Groove; Formats: MP3 CD	—

== Compilation albums ==
Year	Album details	Peak chart positions					
Year	Album details	IRL	UK	DK	NOR	NL	SE
1967	The Best of The Dubliners: Label: Transatlantic; Formats: Vinyl, Cassette	—	25	—	—	—	—
1969	It's The Dubliners: Label: Hallmark; Formats: Vinyl, Cassette	-	-	—	—	—	—
1969	A Drop Of The Dubliners: Label: Major Minor; Formats: Vinyl, Cassette	-	—	—	—	—	—
1977	Home, Boys, Home: Label: Formats: Vinyl, Cassette	—	—	—	—	—	—
1989	Greatest Hits: Label: Formats: Vinyl, Cassette, CD	—	—	—	—	13	—
2002	Best of The Dubliners: Label: Formats: CD, Cassette	69	—	—	—	—	—
2002	40 Years: Label: Celtic Collections; Formats: CD, Cassette	15	—	9	—	—	41
2003	Spirit Of The Irish: Label: Castle US; Formats: CD, Cassette	43	19	—	—	—	—
2004	36 Great Performances: Label: Formats: CD, Cassette	51	—	—	—	—	—
2004	The Definitive Dubliners: Label: Formats: CD, Cassette	33	—	—	—	—	—
2004	At Their Best (Re-Release): Label: Formats: CD,	56	—	—	—	—	—
2005	The Best of the Original Dubliners (Re-Issue): Label: Formats: CD, Digital	69	—	—	—	—	—
2006	Too Late To Stop Now - The Very Best Of The Dubliners: Label: Formats: CD, Digital	23	54	—	—	—	—
2009	The Very Best Of The Dubliners: Label: Formats: CD, Digital	-	16	—	—	—	—
2011	Wild Rover: Label: Formats: CD,	55	—	—	—	—	—
2011	Irish Favorites: Label: Formats: CD,	—	—	—	7	—	—
2011	Original Dubliners (Re-Release): Label: Formats: CD, Digital	14	—	—	—	—	—
2012	50 Years: Label: Formats: CD, DVD Digital	10	—	—	—	—	—
2013	20 Greatest Hits (Re-Release): Label: Formats: CD, Digital	100	—	—	—	—	—
2013	Original Dubliners (Re-Issue): Label: Formats: CD, Digital	39	—	—	—	—	—
2014	Dubliners Originals (Re-Issue): Label: Formats: CD, Digital	36	—	—	—	—	— —
2015	Original Dubliners: Label: Formats: CD, Digital	44	—	—	—	—	—
2015	The Very Best Of: Label: Formats: CD, Digital	31	—	—	—	—	—

== Singles ==
List of singles, with peak chart positions, showing year released and album name
Title	Year	Peak chart positions				Album
Title	Year	IRE	UK	NZ	US World	Album
"The Wild Rover"	1964	—	—	—	—	The Dubliners
"Nelson's Farewell"	1966	6	—	—	—	Finnegan Wakes
"Seven Drunken Nights"	1967	1	7	—	10	A Drop of the Hard Stuff
"All for Me Grog"	1967	10	51 (Note: Chart position is from the official UK "Breakers List".)	—	—	-
"Black Velvet Band"	1967	4	15	—	—	A Drop of the Hard Stuff
"Maids, When You're Young Never Wed an Old Man"	1967	11	43	—	—	Drinkin' and Courtin'
"Dirty Old Town"	1968	10	—	—	—	Drinkin' and Courtin'
"Whiskey In The Jar"	1968	—	—	—	3	
"Hand Me Down My Bible"	1971	7	—	—	—	Hometown!
"Free the People"	1971	7	—	—	—	Double Dubliners
"Four Green Fields"	1977	—	—	—	—	
"Now I'm Easy"	1982	—	—	—	—	Prodigal Sons
"On Raglan Road"	1986	30	—	—	—	The Dubliner's Dublin
"The Irish Rover" (with The Pogues)	1987	1	8	25	—	25 Years Celebration
"Don't Get Married"	1987	24	—	—	—	25 Years Celebration
"Marino Waltz"	1987	4	—	—	—	
"Jack's Heroes" (with The Pogues)	1990	4	63	—	—	Yeah Yeah Yeah Yeah Yeah
"The Rose" (with The Hothouse Flowers)	1991	2	—	—	—	30 Years A-Greying
"Red Roses for Me" (with Niamh Kavanagh)	1994	13	—	—	—	Flying Blind
"Working Man"	1996	—	—	—	—	Further Along
"The Ballad of Ronnie Drew" (with U2 and Various Irish Artists)	2008	1	—	—	—	-
"The Rocky Road to Poland" (with Bressie and Damien Dempsey	2012	1	—	—	—	-
"The Auld Triangle" with Luke Kelly (re-issue)	2013	80	—	—	—	Live in Carré
Total top 75 hits		17	5	1	2	
Total number-one hits		4	0	0	0	

== Other charted songs ==
Release date	Title	US World Digital Songs
2011	"Drink It Up Men"	23
2012	"Seven Drunken Nights"	10
2013	"Whiskey In The Jar" (re-issue)	3

== Music videos ==
Year	Music video	Director(s)	Notes
1967	Seven Drunken Nights	BBC	Official music video released in 1967
1990	Jacks Heroes	RTÉ	The official music video for the 1990 world cup
2008	Ballad of Ronnie Drew	RTÉ	Official music video released in tribute to Ronnie Drew
2012	Rocky Road to Poland	RTÉ	The official music video for the 2012 European Cup

== Dubliner members discography ==
- Luke Kelly discography
- Ronnie Drew discography
