= A Night Out with The Dubliners =

A Night Out With The Dubliners

Live album by The Dubliners
- Released: 13 February 1999
- Recorded: 1974
- Genre: Irish Folk
- Length: 57:57
- Label: Sony Music

A Night Out with the Dubliners is a compilation of live recordings by the Irish folk band the Dubliners released in 1999 on compact disc in the UK, Ireland, Europe and Australia. Most of the material comes from the album Live recorded in 1974, with the remainder of the tracks coming from the albums Live in Carré (1983) and Hometown! (1972), and it contains Ciarán Bourke's last performances after he was left partly paralysed later in 1974 following a stroke that later caused his death.

== Track listing ==
The following tracks are on the album:

1. Seven Drunken Nights
2. Whiskey In The Jar
3. McAlpine's Fusiliers
4. Finnegan's Wake
5. Fermoy Lasses/Sportin' Paddy
6. The Black Velvet Band
7. "Weila, Waile, Walia"
8. The Holy Ground
9. Kimmage (Three Lovely Lassies From)
10. Home Boys Home
11. I Knew Patrick Kavanagh
12. Dicey Riley
13. The Galway Races
14. The Four Poster Bed/Colonel Riley
15. Wild Rover
16. Dirty Old Town
17. All For Me Grog
18. Monto
19. Hand Me Down My Bible
20. The Scholar/The Teetotaller/The High Reel
