= The Best of the Original Dubliners =

The Best Of The Original Dubliners

Compilation album by The Dubliners
- Released: 4 August 2003
- Recorded: 1960s – 1970s
- Genre: Irish folk

Professional ratings
Review scores
Source	Rating
Allmusic	link

The Best of the Original Dubliners is an album by Irish band The Dubliners which charted at No. 69 in Ireland on 17 March 2005. This three CD compilation contains Irish folk songs recorded by Ronnie Drew, Luke Kelly, Barney McKenna, Ciarán Bourke, and John Sheahan between 1967 and 1972. It includes the Dubliner's number one hit, "Seven Drunken Nights", as well as many of their best known songs.

== Track list ==
Disc 1

1. Seven Drunken Nights
2. The Black Velvet Band
3. Whiskey In The Jar
4. All For Me Grog
5. Rising Of The Moon
6. I Wish I Were Back In Liverpool
7. The Bonny Boy
8. The Fairmoye Lasses And Sporting Paddy (Instrumental)
9. Maid Of The Sweet Brown Knowe
10. Molly Maguires
11. McAlpine's Fusiliers
12. Greenland Whale Fishery
13. Biddy Mulligan
14. Musical Priest/Blackthorn Stick
15. Navvy Boots
16. Champion At Keeping Them Rolling
17. I Know My Love

Disc 2

1. I'm A Rover
2. Maids When You're Young Never Wed An Old Man
3. Nancy Whiskey
4. A Pub With No Beer
5. Seven Deadly Sins
6. Black Velvet Band (live)
7. A Nation Once Again
8. The Parting Glass
9. Paddy on the Railway
10. Kelly the Boy from Killan
11. Lowlands of Holland
12. The Breeze
13. Alabama 58
14. The Night Visiting Song
15. Cork Hornpipe
16. Dicey Rilley
17. Whiskey On A Sunday

Disc 3

1. Dirty Old Town
2. Whiskey In The Jar
3. The Auld Triangle
4. The Galway Races
5. Peggy Gordon
6. The Irish Navy
7. Net Hauling Song
8. The Battle Of The Somme/Freedom Come All Ye
9. Smith Of Bristol
10. Tibby Dunbar
11. The Leavin' Of Liverpool
12. The Beggar Man
13. Rattling Roaring Willie
14. School Days Over
15. Louse-House In Kilkenny
16. Mrs. McGrath
17. Seven Drunken Nights (live)
