= Live (The Dubliners album) =

Live album by The Dubliners
- Released: 1974
- Recorded: March 24, 1973
- Venue: Fiesta Club, Sheffield
- Genre: Irish folk
- Label: Polydor
- Producer: Phil Coulter

The Dubliners chronology
Plain and Simple (1973)	Live (1974)	Now (1975)

Live is a live album by The Dubliners recorded live at the Fiesta Club, Sheffield and released on the Polydor label in 1974. This was to be Ronnie Drew's last recording with The Dubliners for five years as he left to pursue a solo career. Also following this album, Ciarán Bourke ceased to be a full-time member of the group when he suffered a brain haemorrhage. He sings "All for Me Grog" here. The reels that open this album (and which first were released on the group's 1967 studio album A Drop of the Hard Stuff) have become the opening instrumental medley at most of their concerts since.

== Track listing ==
Side One:

1. "Fairmoyle Lasses and Sporting Paddy"
2. "Black Velvet Band"
3. "Whiskey in the Jar"
4. "All for the Grog"
5. "The Belfast Hornpipe/Tim Maloney"
6. "The Four Poster Bed/Colonel Rodney"
7. "Finnegan's Wake"
8. "McAlpine's Fusiliers"

Side Two:

1. "Seven Drunken Nights"
2. "Reels - Scholar/Teetotaller/The High Reel"
3. "Home Boys Home"
4. "Dirty Old Town"
5. "Blue Mountain Rag"
6. "The Wild Rover"
7. "Weile Waile"
8. "The Holy Ground"
