= Original Dubliners =

Compilation album by The Dubliners
- Released: 1993
- Recorded: 1960's
- Genre: Irish folk
- Label: EMI

The Dubliners chronology
30 Years A-Greying (1992)	Original Dubliners (1993)	Further Along (1996)

Original Dubliners is an album by The Dubliners. The album charted at No.14 in the Irish Album Chart in its 2011 re-release. In December 2013 the album re-issued into the charts at No.39.
The double disc features EMI albums Seven Drunken Nights (a.k.a. A Drop of the Hard Stuff), Seven Deadly Sins (a.k.a. At It Again), Whiskey On A Sunday (a compilation) and More of the Hard Stuff.

== Track list ==
=== Disc 1 ===
1. Seven Drunken Nights
2. The Galway Races
3. The Old Alarm Clock
4. Colonel Fraser & O'Rourke's Reel
5. The Rising of the Moon
6. McCafferty
7. I'm a Rover
8. Weila Weila Waile
9. The Travelling People
10. Limerick Rake
11. Zoological Gardens
12. The Fairmoye Lasses and Sporting Paddy
13. Black Velvet Band
14. Poor Paddy on the Railway
15. Seven Deadly Sins
16. Net Hauling Song
17. Nancy Whiskey
18. Many Young Men of Twenty
19. Instrumental Medley: Paddy's Gone to France / Skylark
20. Molly Bawn
21. The Dundee Weaer
22. The Irish Navy
23. Tibby Dunbar
24. The Inniskillen Dragoons
25. I Wish I Were Back in Liverpool
26. Go to Sea No More

=== Disc 2 ===
1. Instrumental Medley: the Piper's Chair / Billy Hart's Jig / The Night ...
2. Darby O'Leary
3. All for Me Grog
4. Cork Hornpipe
5. Peggy Gordon
6. Maid of the Sweet Brown Knowe
7. Quare Bungle Rye
8. Flop Eared Mule (Donkey Reel)
9. Poor Old Dicey Riley
10. Whiskey on a Sunday
11. Gentleman Soldier
12. Navvy Boots
13. Maids, When You're Young, Never Wed an Old Man
14. Rattling Roaring Willie
15. Mrs McGarth
16. Carolan Concerto
17. The Partin' Glass
18. Muirsheen Durkin
19. A Nation Once Again
20. Whiskey in the Jar
21. The Old Triangle
22. A Pub With No Beer
23. Kelly, the Boy from Killan
24. Croppy Boy
25. Sullivan John
26. Come and Join the British Army
27. (The Bonny) Shoals of Herring
28. Mormon Breas
29. Drink It up Men
30. Maloney Wants a Drink

== Chart performance ==
Chart (2011–2013)	Peak position
Irish Albums (IRMA)	14
