= Double Dubliners =

Studio album by The Dubliners
- Released: 1972
- Recorded: 1972
- Genre: Irish folk
- Label: EMI
- Producer: Phil Coulter

The Dubliners chronology
Hometown! (1972)	Double Dubliners (1972)	Plain and Simple (1973)

Singles from A Drop of the Hard Stuff
- 1. "Free the People" / "The Beggarman" Released: 7 October 1971

Double Dubliners is The Dubliners' ninth studio album, and features all five members of the classical line-up. It is also known as Alive and Well, the title it was released under on the Polydor label. A standout track here is a recitation by Ronnie Drew of Pádraig Pearse's poem "The Rebel". Other notable tracks here are "The Sun Is Burning" and "The Night Visiting Song", both sung by Luke Kelly. In December 1983, "The Night Visiting Song" would become the final song to be performed by Luke Kelly with The Dubliners on Irish television.

Frank Peters in The Northern Echo commented that the choice of different instrumentation of the album "lost something of the flavor in the change" as compared to previous albums and the slower pace of the songs caused the vocal harmonies to become "raggy-edged".

== Track listing ==
=== Side one ===
1. "Free the People"
2. "The Louse House of Kilkenny"
3. "The Springhill Disaster"
4. "The Musical Priest/The Blackthorn Stick"
5. "Champion at Keeping Them Rolling"
6. "The Sun Is Burning"

=== Side two ===
1. "Gentleman Soldier"
2. "The Rebel"
3. "The Gartan Mother's Lullaby"
4. "Drops of Brandy/Lady Carberry"
5. "Smith of Bristol"
6. "The Night Visiting Song"

== Personnel ==
- Ciarán Bourke – tin whistle, harmonica, acoustic guitar, lead and backing vocals
- Ronnie Drew – acoustic guitar, lead and backing vocals
- Luke Kelly – banjo, lead and backing vocals
- Barney McKenna – tenor banjo, mandolin
- John Sheahan – fiddle, tin whistle, mandolin

== Notes ==
- Produced by Phil Coulter who also penned the hit single "Free The People", which opens the album.
