= More of the Hard Stuff =

Studio album by The Dubliners
- Released: 1967
- Genre: Irish folk
- Label: Major Minor
- Producer: Tommy Scott

The Dubliners chronology
A Drop of the Hard Stuff (1967)	More of the Hard Stuff (1967)	Drinkin' and Courtin' (1968)

Alternative cover
- Re-release cover

Professional ratings
Review scores
Source	Rating
AllMusic	4/5 stars
Ox	5/5 stars

More of the Hard Stuff is the second studio album by The Dubliners, originally released in 1967. The line-up consists of Ronnie Drew, Luke Kelly, Barney McKenna, Ciarán Bourke and John Sheahan. True to its title, five of the songs concern hard drinking. One of the songs was written by Brendan Behan, another by his brother Dominic. The album reached number 8 in the UK album charts in 1967, and stayed in the charts for 23 weeks.

The original cover (pictured) consists of a photograph taken inside Kelly's Cellars bar in Belfast, County Antrim.

== Track listing ==
=== Side one ===
1. "Muirsheen Durkin" (Traditional)
2. "Poor Old Dicey Reilly" (Traditional, adaptation by Dominic Behan)
3. "A Nation Once Again" (Davis)
4. "Whiskey in the Jar" (Traditional)
5. "The Old Triangle" (Brendan Behan)
6. "A Pub with No Beer" (Parsons)
7. "Kelly, the Boy from Killan" (Traditional)

=== Side two ===
1. "The Croppy Boy" (Traditional)
2. "Sullivan's John" (*) (Pecker Dunne)
3. "Come and Join the British Army" (Traditional, adaptation Dominic Behan)
4. "(The Bonny) Shoals of Herring" (Ewan MacColl)
5. "Mormond Braes" (Traditional)
6. "Drink It Up Men" (Meek)
7. "Maloney Wants a Drink" (Dominic Behan)

(*) With spoken introduction.

== Charts ==
Chart (1967)	Peak position
UK Albums (OCC)	8
