= Drinkin' and Courtin' =

Studio album by The Dubliners
- Released: 1968
- Genre: Irish folk
- Label: Major Minor
- Producer: Tommy Scott

The Dubliners chronology
More of the Hard Stuff (1967)	Drinkin' and Courtin' (1968)	At It Again (1968)

Singles from Drinkin' and Courtin'
- 1. "Maids When You're Young Never Wed an Old Man" / "Quare Bungle Rye" Released: 20 December 1967; 2. "Dirty Old Town" / "Peggy Gordon" Released: 1968

Drinkin' and Courtin is an album by The Dubliners. It was originally released in 1968. The line-up consists of Ronnie Drew, Luke Kelly, Barney McKenna, Ciarán Bourke and John Sheahan. Two tracks are instrumentals. Five of the songs are comic. It reached number 31 in the UK album charts in 1968.

== Track listing ==
=== Side One ===
1. "Dirty Old Town" (Ewan MacColl)
2. "Quare Bungle Rye" (Trad)
3. "Peggy Gordon" (Trad)
4. "Rattling Roaring Willie" (Trad)
5. "Carolan's Concerto" (instrumental) (Trad)
6. "The Herring" (Trad)
7. "The Parting Glass" (Trad)

=== Side Two ===
1. "Maids When You're Young Never Wed an Old Man" (Trad)
2. "Gentleman Soldier" (Trad)
3. "Hand Me Down Me Petticoat" (Trad)
4. "Flop Eared Mule (Donkey Reel)" (instrumental) (Trad)
5. "I Know My Love" (Trad)
6. "Mrs. McGrath" (*) (Trad)
7. "Maid of the Sweet Brown Knowe" (Trad)
8. "My Little Son" (Trad)

(*) The version of the song featured on the album is a parody of the original about Ciarán Bourke's experience as a university student.

== Charts ==
Chart (1968)	Peak position
Irish Albums (IRMA)	5
UK Albums (OCC)	31
