= Live in Carré =

Live album by The Dubliners
- Released: 1985
- Recorded: 6 October 1983
- Venue: Carré Theatre; Amsterdam, Netherlands
- Genre: Irish folk
- Length: 54:11
- Label: Polydor
- Producer: Reinoud Weidema, Rob Smaling, Tom Steenbergen

The Dubliners chronology
| Prodigal Sons (1983) | Live in Carré (1985) | 25 Years Celebration (1987) |

Professional ratings
Review scores
| Source | Rating |
|---|---|
| Allmusic | 3/5 stars |

Live in Carré is a live album by The Dubliners. Recorded live in Amsterdam in October 1983, this album featured Luke Kelly's final recordings with The Dubliners.

== Track listing ==
All tracks Traditional; arranged by The Dubliners unless otherwise stated Side One:

1. "Sweets of May"
2. "Dicey Reilly"
3. "Song for Ireland" (Phil Colclough)
4. "Building Up and Tearing England Down" (Dominic Behan)
5. "Dunphy's Hornpipe/Leitrim Fancy/Down the Broom"
6. "Dirty Old Town" (Ewan McColl)
7. "The Old Triangle" (Brendan Behan)

Side Two:

1. "The Waterford Boys/Reels: The Humours of Scariff/The Flannel Jacket"
2. "Galway Races"
3. "The Prodigal Son" (John Sheahan)
4. "Whiskey in the Jar"
5. "The Sick Note" (Pat Cooksey)
6. "The Wild Rover"
7. "Seven Drunken Nights"

== Personnel ==
- Seán Cannon - vocals, acoustic guitar
- Ronnie Drew - vocals, acoustic guitar
- Luke Kelly - vocals, banjo, spoons
- Barney McKenna - vocals, tenor banjo, mandolin
- John Sheahan - fiddle, tin whistle, vocals
