= Ronnie Drew discography =

- Ronnie Drew 2006
- Studio albums: 10
- EPs: 1
- Live albums: 2
- Compilation albums: 1
- Tribute albums: 1
- Singles: 4
- B-sides: 4
- Music videos: 10
- Misc. Appearances: 7
- Bootleg albums: 1

Ronnie Drew was an Irish folk musician who founded The Dubliners in 1962. As a solo artist he released twelve studio albums, one compilation album and four singles.

== Albums ==
Year	Album details	Peak chart positions	
Year	Album details	IRL	UK
1975	Ronnie Drew: Label: Dolphin Records; Formats: Vinyl	1	-
1978	Guaranteed: Label: Dolphin Records; Formats: Vinyl	7	-
1995	Dirty Rotten Shame: Label: Sony; Formats: CD, Cassette	2	-
1999	The Humour Is On Me Now: Label: Formats: CD, Cassette	10	-
2000	A Couple More Years: Label: Pinorrek; Formats: CD, Cassette	47	-
2004	An Evening With Ronnie Drew: Label: Formats: CD	-	-
2006	El Amor De Mi Vida: Label: Formats: CD	-	-
2006	There's Life In The Old Dog Yet: Label: Dolphin Records; Formats: CD	-	-
2007	Pearls: Label: Dolphin Records; Formats: CD	-	-
2008	Guaranteed Dubliner: Label: Dolphin Records; Formats: CD	50	-
2008	The Last Session: A Fond Farewell: Label: Celtic Collections; Formats: CD	18	-

== Compilation albums ==
Year	Album details	Peak chart positions	
Year	Album details	IRL	UK
2007	The Very Best Of Ronnie Drew: Label: Formats: CD	12	-

== Featured Albums ==
List of studio albums, with selected chart positions
Title	Album details	Peak chart positions									
Title	Album details	US	AUS	AUT	BEL (FL)	FIN	GER	IRL	NLD	SWE	UK
The Meanest of Times	Released: 18 September 2007; Label: Born & Bred; Formats: CD, LP, digital download	20	85	72	92	—	38	98	76	18	165
"—" denotes a recording that did not chart or was not released in that territory.

== EPs ==
Year	Album details	Peak chart positions	
Year	Album details	IRL	UK
2006	A New World (EP): Label: Formats: CD	-	-

== Singles ==
List of singles, with peak chart positions, showing year released and album name
Title	Year	Peak chart positions		Album
Title	Year	IRE	UK	Album
"Weila Weila"	1975	15	-	Ronnie Drew
"The Spanish Lady" (with Dustin The Turkey)	1994	1	-	The Very Best of Dustin
"The Ballad of Ronnie Drew" / "Easy and Slow" (with The Dubliners and U2)	2008	1	-	Non album single
"Easy and Slow"	2008	18	-	The Last Session: A Fond Farewell

== Music videos ==
Year	Music video	Director(s)	Notes
1994	"Spanish Lady"	RTÉ	Number one single for 4 weeks video with Ronnie Drew, Dustin the Turkey and The Saw Doctors.

== See also ==
- The Dubliners discography
