= Live at the Albert Hall =

Live album by The Dubliners
- Released: 1969
- Recorded: 1968
- Venue: Royal Albert Hall, London
- Genre: Irish folk
- Label: Major Minor
- Producer: Tommy Scott

The Dubliners chronology
At It Again (1968)	Live at the Albert Hall (1969)	At Home with The Dubliners (1969)

Professional ratings
Review scores
Source	Rating
Allmusic	4.5/5 stars

Live at the Albert Hall is a live album by The Dubliners. It was their last recording for the Major Minor label. Recorded in 1968 and released in 1969, it contained live versions of some of their recent hits as well as a version of "Whiskey on a Sunday", which had been a big hit for Danny Doyle. The rebel ballad "Off to Dublin in the Green" was issued on early pressings of the album, but was later dropped. The album features the original band members.

In November 2006, an edited version was released by EMI as a third disc as part of The Dubliners Platinum Collection.

== Track listing ==
All tracks Traditional; except where indicated

=== Side One ===
1. "Black Velvet Band"
2. "McAlpine's Fusiliers"
3. "Peggy Gordon"
4. "Weila Waile"
5. "Monto"
6. "Cork Hornpipe"
7. "Leaving of Liverpool"

=== Side Two ===
1. "Whiskey on a Sunday" (Glyn Hughes)
2. "I Wish I Were Back in Liverpool" (Leon Rosselson, Stan Kelly)
3. "Flop-eared Mule"
4. "Navvy Boots"
5. "Whiskey in the Jar"
6. "Maids When You're Young Never Wed an Old Man"
7. "Seven Drunken Nights"
8. "Off to Dublin in the Green"
