= Irish folk music (1980–1989) =

== Births and deaths ==
=== Deaths ===
- Seamus Ennis (1912–1982)
- Joe Heaney (1919–1984)
- Luke Kelly (1940–1984)
- Hugh Gillespie (1906–1986)
- Ewan MacColl (1915–1989)
- Margaret Barry (1917–c. 1989 or 1990)
- Ciarán Bourke

== Recordings ==
- 1980 "Mist Covered Mountain" (De Dannan)
- 1981 "Star Spangled Molly" (De Dannan)
- 1981 "Plays with Himself" (Derek Bell)
- 1982 "Musical Ireland" (Derek Bell)
- 1984 "Red Roses for Me" (The Pogues)
- 1985 "Rum, Sodomy and The Lash" (The Pogues)
- 1985 "To Welcome Paddy Home" (The Boys of the Lough)
- 1986 "The Celts" (Enya)
- 1987 "Altan" (Altan)
- 1988 "If I Should Fall From Grace With God" (The Pogues)
