= 20 Greatest Hits (The Dubliners album) =

Greatest hits album by The Dubliners
- Released: 7 January 2013
- Recorded: 1960s–1990s
- Genre: Traditional Irish
- Length: 1:11:00
- Label: IML

The Dubliners chronology
50 Years (2012)	20 Greatest Hits (2013)

20 Greatest Hits is an album by The Dubliners, re-released on 7 January 2013. The album charted at No.100 in the Irish Album Charts.

== Track listing ==
1. "Free the People" – 3:14
2. "Biddy Mulligan" – 2:00
3. "Scorn Not His Simplicity" – 3:38
4. "Donegal Danny" – 5:41
5. "Joe Hill" – 2:48
6. "The Captains & the Kings" – 3:34
7. "My Darling Asleep / Paddy in London / An t-Athair Jack Walsh" – 2:58
8. "Molly Malone" – 2:58
9. "Song for Ireland " – 4:42
10. "Dicey Rielly" – 2:41
11. "The Rare Old Times" – 5:30
12. "Finnegan's Wake" – 2:30
13. "The Marino Waltz" – 2:40
14. "The Auld Triangle" – 2:55
15. "I'll Tell Me Ma" – 2:31
16. "The Town I Loved So Well" – 6:22
17. "Cooley’s Reel / The Dawn / The Mullingar Races" – 3:26
18. "The Night Visiting Song" – 3:28
19. "Seven Drunken Nights" – 3:14
20. "The Irish Rover" – 4:06
