= A Drop of the Hard Stuff =

- Cover to the original edition of the album

Studio album by The Dubliners
- Released: 1967
- Genre: Irish folk
- Length: 43:07
- Label: Major Minor
- Producer: Tommy Scott

The Dubliners chronology
Finnegan Wakes (1966)	A Drop of the Hard Stuff (1967)	More of the Hard Stuff (1967)

Singles from A Drop of the Hard Stuff
- 1. "Seven Drunken Nights" / "Paddy on the Railway" Released: 30 March 1967; 2. "The Black Velvet Band" / "Maloney Wants a Drink" Released: 30 August 1967

Alternative cover
- Seven Drunken Nights

A Drop of the Hard Stuff is the debut studio album of the Irish folk group The Dubliners. It was originally released in 1967 on Major Minor Records (SMLP3 and MMLP3). When it was reissued, it was renamed Seven Drunken Nights after the first track became a hit single. The album reached number 5 in the UK album chart, and stayed in the charts for 41 weeks. The album cover provides biographical sketches of the band line-up: Ronnie Drew, Luke Kelly, Barney McKenna, Ciarán Bourke and John Sheahan. "Limerick Rake" is sung unaccompanied. Most of the songs concern rogues and drinking. "Weila Waile" is a tragic murder ballad, sung with a certain jollity.

The album title is both an allusion to hard liquor, particularly Irish whiskey, and to the musical difficulty of the fourteen songs chosen for the album, which emphasize the considerable depths of talent of the group, from the intricate fiddle and banjo work on "The Galway Races" and the reels, to the impressive a cappella rendition of "Limerick Rake".

Variety described the album as having "tremendous verve", while Billboard selected it as a "Special Merit Pick", writing of it as "excellent" and saying that the group had a "genuine feel for the material". Disc praised it as "full of character".

== Track listing ==
All songs are traditional compositions, with the exception of "The Travelling People," which was written by English performer Ewan MacColl.

Side one
No.	Title	Length
1.	"Seven Drunken Nights"	3:43
2.	"The Galway Races"	3:17
3.	"The Old Alarm Clock"	1:56
4.	"Reels: Colonel Fraser & O'Rourke's Reel"	2:36
5.	"The Rising of the Moon"	2:36
6.	"McCafferty"	2:26
7.	"I'm a Rover"	4:49

Side two
No.	Title	Length
1.	"Weile Waile"	3:25
2.	"The Travelling People"	3:50
3.	"Limerick Rake"	3:10
4.	"Zoological Gardens"	2:09
5.	"Reels: Fermoy Lasses & Sporting Paddy"	1:55
6.	"The Black Velvet Band"	4:26
7.	"Paddy on the Railway"	2:49

- Track 5 misspells Fermoy as "Fairmoye" on disc sleeve.

== Charts ==
Chart (1967)	Peak position
Irish Albums (IRMA)	1
UK Albums (OCC)	5
