= At It Again (album) =

Studio album by The Dubliners
- Released: 1968
- Genre: Irish folk
- Label: Major Minor
- Producer: Tommy Scott

The Dubliners chronology
Drinkin' and Courtin' (1968)	At It Again (1968)	Live at the Albert Hall (1969)

At It Again is a studio album by The Dubliners and was released on the Major Minor label in 1968. It featured "The Irish Navy", a satirical song with lyrics co-written by Ronnie Drew and Luke Kelly and set to music by John Sheahan. Barney McKenna and Ciarán Bourke also feature on the album. It was re-released under the title Seven Deadly Sins. The order of the tracks varies in different re-releases.

== Track listing ==
=== Side One ===
1. "Seven Deadly Sins" (McLean)
2. "Net Hauling Song" (Ewan MacColl)
3. "Nancy Whiskey" (Collected MacColl)
4. "Many Young Men of Twenty" (Keane)
5. "Instrumental medley: Paddy's Gone to France, Skylark" (Traditional)
6. "Molly Bawn" (Traditional)
7. "The Dundee Weaver" (Collected by Jeffrey)

=== Side Two ===
1. "The Irish Navy" (Drew-Kelly)
2. "Tibby Dunbar" (Robert Burns and Jim McLean)
3. "The Inniskillen Dragoons" (Traditional)
4. "Instrumental medley: The Piper's Chair, Bill Hart's Jig, The Knights (misspelled as Nights) of St. Patrick" (Traditional)
5. "I Wish I Were Back in Liverpool" (Kelly-Rosselson)
6. "'Darby O'Leary"
7. "Go to Sea No More" (Collected by Halliday)
