= Bob Lynch (musician) =

- Born: 18 March 1935; Dublin, Ireland
- Died: 2 October 1982 (aged 47) Dublin, Ireland
- Genres: Irish folk
- Formerly of: The Dubliners

Bob Lynch (18 March 1935 – 2 October 1982) was an Irish folk musician from Dublin. He first became notable as a member of The Dubliners from 1964 to 1965 until he left to pursue a solo career in North America.

== Early life ==
Bob joined The Dubliners in 1964 with John Sheahan after meeting with Ronnie Drew, the front man of the group. Not long after, Luke Kelly left the group for a year to work in England, so the two new members joined full-time. Lynch played the acoustic guitar and sang. He was also present with the group when they filmed O'Donoghue's Opera. He only recorded one album with the band, In Concert, in 1964, before leaving in 1965 when Luke Kelly returned later that year.

He had relative success in North America with his solo career, with two of the songs he wrote charting in the U.S. He released a solo album in 1980, titled From The Land of Carolan.

== Personal life ==
For the last year of his life Lynch was severely depressed and committed suicide on 2 October 1982. He was a father of three children. The news came as a shock to the public and The Dubliners, with friend John Sheahan stating, "His suicide was a shock, because he was always a very happy fella. Always cracking jokes. We drifted apart and I had lost contact with him for the previous five or six years before he died.".
