= At It Again =

At It Again may refer to:

- At It Again (album), a 1968 album by The Dubliners
- At It Again (film), a 1912 American short silent comedy film
