= 20 Greatest Hits =

20 Greatest Hits may refer to:

- 20 Greatest Hits (Beatles album)
- 20 Greatest Hits (The Dubliners album)
- 20 Greatest Hits (Glen Campbell album)
- 20 Greatest Hits (Kenny Rogers album)
- 20 Greatest Hits (Simon & Garfunkel album)
- 20 Greatest Hits (Tom Jones album)

== See also ==
- 20 All-Time Greatest Hits!, a 1991 James Brown compilation
- 20 – The Greatest Hits (Laura Pausini album)
