= Finbar Lebowitz =

- Directed by: Rona Mark
- Produced by: Jennifer Smith
- Starring: David McCarton; Ronnie Drew; Shana Sturtz; Zoë Gibney; Simon Murphy
- Music by: John Doyle
- Release date: 19 May 2000
- Running time: 25 min.
- Country: Ireland
- Language: English
- Budget: £44,000 (Estimate)

Finbar Lebowitz is an Irish 2000 film, set in Dublin about a working class Irishman called Finbar. It stars David McCarton and The Dubliners founder Ronnie Drew.

== Plot summary ==
Finbar is a working class Irishman who works for a delivery company in Dublin. He holds a somewhat racist and prejudiced view of America. While on delivery he stops at a bookstore run by Shimon Abramsky, an elderly Jewish man who has his niece Leah from New York City stopping with him to help out. After a conversation with Leah, Finbar becomes obsessed with her and makes it his goal to woo her after a dare from his delivery friend. Finbar even tries to convert to Judaism, to the consternation of his strict Catholic priest and family. It takes more than a conversion to win Leah's heart.
