= Patrick Fleming (highwayman) =

Irish highwayman executed in 1650

Patrick Fleming was an Irish highwayman and the subject of poems and songs in Ireland. He was executed on 24 April 1650.

== Life ==
Fleming was born into a family of potato farmers at Athlone. His mother and father leased the land at a rate of 15 shillings a year. They lived in a one-room house with Patrick and his eight siblings.

At age 13, he went into service with Elizabeth Nugent, Countess of Kildare. He reportedly neglected his duties and displayed insolence, and was discharged from her service. He was soon taken into household service by the Earl of Antrim. Fleming fell out of favour after discovering the household priest sleeping in an obscene position and bringing in other household staff as witnesses; subsequently, the earl discharged him in disgrace. Before leaving, Fleming was alleged to have stolen money and items worth 200 pounds. He then fled to Athenry, Connacht, hiding out for less than two weeks until he felt safe enough to continue to Dublin. Fleming joined a gang of thieves and was reputed to have robbed more houses in his six years of operation in Dublin than had ever been robbed previously.

When his notoriety made it too dangerous for him to remain in Dublin, Fleming set out for the Bog of Allen and became a highwayman full time. He attacked rich and poor, threatening his victims with death should they not cooperate. He also formed a gang in the Barnsmore area near the Colorockedie woods and robbed more than 125 men and women. Some of his gang members were captured and hanged. Fleming was reputed to have robbed notable people of the time including the Archbishop of Armagh, the Bishop of Raphoe, and the Archbishop of Tuam, reportedly taking 1,000 pounds from him. Fleming set upon Lady Baltimore who was travelling with her four-year-old son, whom he kidnapped, stating to her that if she did not pay a ransom within 24 hours he would "cut the young puppy's throat and make a pie of him".

Fleming was apprehended in Munster after robbing a nobleman of 250 pounds and was transported to prison in Cork. He was able to escape through a chimney in the jail and avoided being hanged at that time.

Fleming continued for some years with notably vicious robberies, reportedly murdering five men, two women and a boy aged 14. He also maimed and injured others, including Sir Donagh O'Brien, who resisted the robbery attempt and had his nose, lips and ears cut off by Fleming.

Fleming was turned in to the authorities by the landlord of a house he and his accomplices frequented. The landlord soaked the criminals' firearms with water prior to the sheriff arriving with his men. Fleming and fourteen of his gang were taken to Dublin and hanged in chains in the city on 24 April 1650. His body was hanged .

== Legend ==
Poems have been written about his exploits named The Ballad of Patrick Flemming or Patrick Flemmen he was a Valiant Soldier, both said to be the foundation for the Irish ballad Whiskey in the Jar.

== References and sources ==
Notes
