= On Raglan Road =

Irish song based on a poem by Patrick Kavanagh

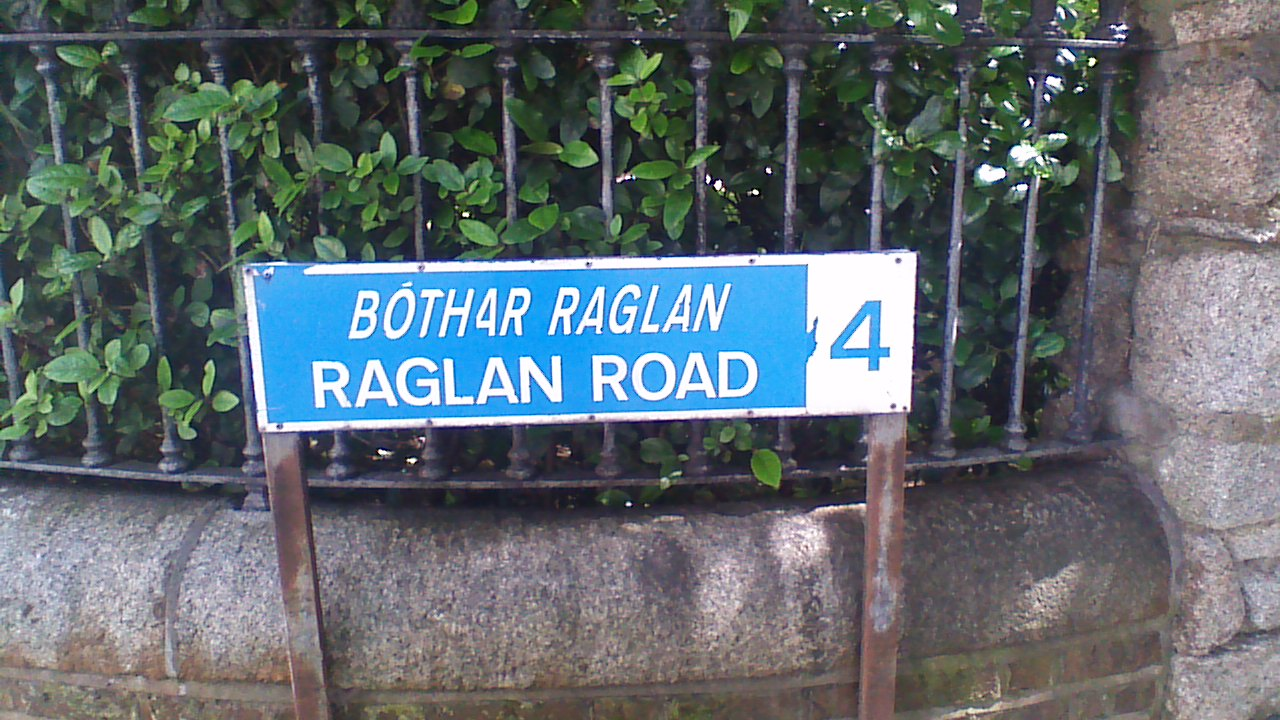
Raglan Road street sign-showing Dublin 4 post code

"On Raglan Road" is a well-known Irish song from a poem written by Irish poet Patrick Kavanagh named after Raglan Road in Ballsbridge, Dublin. In the poem, the speaker recalls, while walking on a "quiet street," an unrequited love he had for a much younger woman. Although he knew he would risk being hurt if he initiated a relationship, he attempted to do so anyway, and ultimately faced heartache after his romantic feelings were not reciprocated.

== History ==
=== As a poem ===
It was first published as a poem in The Irish Press on 3 October 1946 under the title "Dark Haired Miriam Ran Away". Peter Kavanagh, Patrick's brother, said, "it was written about Patrick's girlfriend Hilda, but to avoid embarrassment, he used the name of my girlfriend in the title." Her real name was Dr. Hilda Moriarty, then a medical student from County Kerry. Though she regarded Kavanagh as a friend, her feelings were not romantic, as this newspaper article explains. In 1947, she married Donogh O'Malley, who later became Fianna Fáil Minister for Education.

In 1987, Moriarty was interviewed by Irish broadcaster RTÉ for a documentary about Kavanagh called Gentle Tiger. In the interview, she said one of the main reasons she was not interested in a romantic relationship was that a wide age gap existed between them. She was 22 and he was 40.

Moriarty also described how "On Raglan Road" came to be written. Kavanagh had lived in Pembroke Road in Dublin, but as he could not afford the rent he sublet the flat. He then moved into Mrs. Kenny's boarding house on Raglan Road (a road off Pembroke Road), which cost 10 shillings a week full board. The house is presently the Mexican embassy. Moriarty was also staying on Raglan Road. Kavanagh observed her coming and going from Raglan Road to University on a daily basis, and as an excuse to meet with her in the Country Shop on St Stephen's Green or Mitchell's on Dawson Street, he often asked Moriarty to critique his work. Kavanagh described himself as a peasant poet, but Moriarty was not that impressed and teased him, "Can you not, then, write about anything other than stony grey soil and bogs, Paddy?" Kavanagh said, "I will immortalise you in poetry, Hilda." According to Moriarty, he went away and wrote the poem.

Moriarty subsequently featured in rough drafts of 4 untitled works, 3 were to become "Bluebells for Love." The other was a rough, first draft of "Dark Haired Miriam Ran Away." These 4 pieces, known as the "Hilda Poems", are available to read on the Patrick Kavanagh Trust website. It wasn't until 1964 when "On Raglan Road" first appeared under that title, along with a line change. It appeared in his "Collected Poems."

=== As a song ===
"Scorn Not His Simplicity/On Raglan Road"

Single by The Dubliners
- Released: 1971
- Genre: Folk, Irish
- Length: 3:15
- Label: CHYME
- Composer: Traditional
- Lyricist: Patrick Kavanagh

The Dubliners singles chronology
"Free The People" (1971)	"Scorn Not His Simplicity/On Raglan Road" (1971)	"The Irish Rover" (1987)

The poem was put to music when the poet met Luke Kelly of the Irish band The Dubliners in a pub in Dublin called The Bailey. It was set to the music of the traditional song "The Dawning of the Day" (Fáinne Geal an Lae). An Irish-language song with this name (Fáinne Geal an Lae) was published by Edward Walsh (1805–1850) in 1847 in Irish Popular Songs, and later translated into English as "The Dawning of the Day," published by Patrick Weston Joyce in 1873. Given the similarity in themes and the use of the phrase "dawning of the day" in both "On Raglan Road" and the traditional tune, Kavanagh quite likely imagined the pairing of verse and tune from the beginning. Indeed, a recording was broadcast of Kavanagh singing "On Raglan Road" to the tune on Irish television, and in 1974, Benedict Kiely recalled in an interview for RTÉ of Kavanagh trying out the paired verse and tune for him soon after its writing. Kelly himself acknowledges that song was given to him that evening at The Bailey.

The Dubliners released the original recording as the B-side to "Scorn Not His Simplicity" in 1971. One year later the song was included on their live album Hometown! Their most famous recording of the song was included on the 1986 compilation album Luke's Legacy, which was recorded in the same session as the 1983 album Prodigal Sons.

Besides Kelly's version with The Dubliners, the song, often known simply as "Raglan Road", has since been performed by Van Morrison with The Chieftains, Mark Knopfler, Ed Sheeran, The Young Dubliners, Sinéad O'Connor, Billy Bragg, Roger Daltrey, Dick Gaughan, Loreena McKennitt, Billy Joel, Joan Osborne, Órla Fallon, Ian Tamblyn, Tommy Fleming, Mary Black, Bonnie 'Prince' Billy, Martin Simpson, and Nyle Wolfe among others.

"On Raglan Road" sung to the tune of "The Dawning of the Day", by Tom Dillon, at the Volunteer pub, Sidmouth, August 1994

The Luke Kelly version was also featured in the 2008 film In Bruges.

The song was performed by Andrew Scott in the 2013 Irish film The Stag.
