= Ronnie Drew (album) =

Studio album by Ronnie Drew
- Released: 1975
- Label: Ram Records
- Producer: John Curran

Ronnie Drew chronology
Ronnie Drew (1975)	Guaranteed (1978)

Ronnie Drew is the debut album of Ronnie Drew, released in 1975.

Produced by John Curran, this was Ronnie's first solo album, made in 1975 after he first left The Dubliners. Many of the tracks he had previously recorded, or would subsequently re-record, with The Dubliners. The album contains his original recording of "The Irish Rover", which would later become a huge hit for The Dubliners when they recorded the song with The Pogues.

== Track listing ==
=== Side one ===
1. "Building Up and Tearing England Down" - 2:56
2. "Irish Rover" - 2:54
3. "James Larkin" - 1:55
4. "Whack Fal Da Diddle" - 2:00
5. "Finnegan's Wake" - 2:05
6. "Master McGrath" - 3:14
7. "Van Diemen's Land" - 2:12

=== Side two ===
1. "A Bunch of Red Roses" - 2:11
2. "The Old Man" - 5:37
3. "D'Ya Remember Jem" - 1:52
4. "Weila Weila Waile" - 2:36
5. "The Old Triangle" - 1:56
6. "The Beggarman" - 2:20

== Personnel ==
- Ronnie Drew - guitar, vocals
- Eamonn Campbell - guitar, mandolin, banjo
- Reg Lloyd - bass
- John Curran - flute
