= The Last Session: A Fond Farewell =

The Last Session

Studio album by Ronnie Drew
- Released: 2008
- Genre: Jazz

The Last Session: A Fond Farewell is an album that contains Ronnie Drew's final recordings, released in November 2008, three months after his death it charted in Ireland, peaking at number 18. It was produced by Gavin Ralston and featured Ronnie duetting with special guests Damien Dempsey, Mary Coughlan and Emmanuel Lawler on songs recorded in a traditional jazz style, and thus hinting Ronnie's longlife passion for jazz music. It was recorded in Silverwood Studios in Wicklow.

== Track listing ==
1. "Nobody Knows You When You're Down and Out" (Jimmy Cox) – 3:44
2. "September Song" (Kurt Weill) – 3:03
3. "Rainy Night in Soho" (duet with Damien Dempsey) (Shane MacGowan) – 4:49
4. "For Ronnie" (guitar solo: Hugh Buckley) (Hugh Buckley, Pete St. John) – 3:21
5. "The Last Wave" (Aengus Fanning) – 2:09
6. "We Had It All" (duet with Mary Coughlan) (Mike Hanrahan) – 3:21
7. "The Auld Triangle" (Brendan Behan) – 4:22
8. "Molly Malone" (traditional; arr. Buckley) – 2:50
9. "Love's Own Sweet Song" (duet with Emmanuel Lawler) (Emmerich Kálmán, C.C.S. Cushing, E.P. Heath) – 3:43
10. "Inspiration for the Bards (Until Spring)" (poem) (Willie Buckley) – 2:11
