= Dirty Old Town =

Song by Ewan MacColl

- Side A of the UK single

Single by the Dubliners

from the album Drinkin' and Courtin'
- B-side: "Peggy Gordon"
- Released: 1968
- Genre: Folk, pop
- Length: 2:53
- Label: Major Minor
- Songwriter: Ewan MacColl
- Producer: Tommy Scott

The Dubliners singles chronology
"Maids When You're Young Never Wed An Old Man" (1967)	"Dirty Old Town" (1968)	"Hand Me Down My Bible" (1971)

Audio
- "Dirty Old Town" by the Dubliners on YouTube

"Dirty Old Town" is a song written by Ewan MacColl in 1949 that was made popular by the Dubliners, the Spinners, the Pogues and Rod Stewart.

== History ==
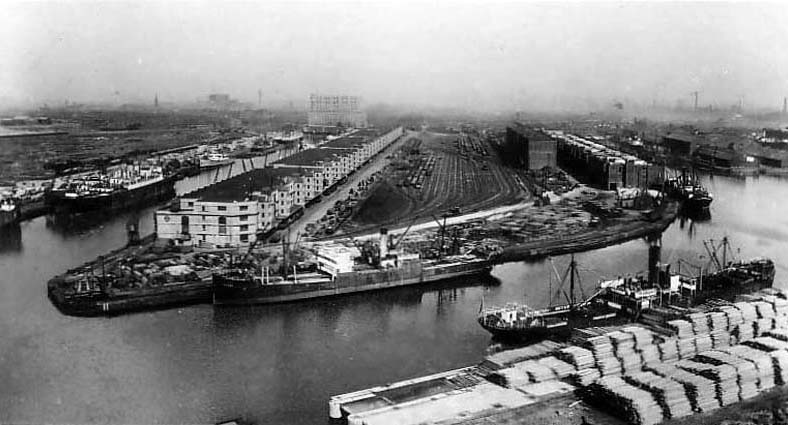
Salford Docks, a place mentioned in the song

The song was written about Salford, then in Lancashire (now in Greater Manchester), England, the area where MacColl was born and brought up. It was originally composed for the 1949 play Landscape with Chimneys, produced by Joan Littlewood and Theatre Workshop and set in a North of England industrial town. With the growing popularity of folk music in the 1960s the song became a standard in the repertory of British folk club singers.

In a BBC radio documentary about “Dirty Old Town”, Professor Ben Harker (author of Class Act: The Cultural and Political Life of Ewan MacColl, 2007, Pluto Press) explains that although MacColl later claimed the song was written as an interlude "to cover an awkward scene change", studying the script of the play Landscape with Chimneys reveals the song occurs at the beginning and at the end of the play. Harker argues the song is important to the play because “it captures the movement from dreamy optimism and romance to militancy, frustration and anger. That’s the trajectory of the song and of the play.”

The first verse refers to the "gasworks croft" which was a piece of open land adjacent to Salford gasworks, and then speaks of the old canal, which was the Manchester, Bolton and Bury Canal. The line in the original version about smelling a spring on “the Salford wind” is sometimes sung as “the sulphured wind”. But in any case, most singers tend to drop the Salford reference altogether, in favour of calling the wind “smoky”. (This is the case in MacColl's own 1983 recording of the song.)

=== The Dubliners version ===
The Dubliners recorded "Dirty Old Town" as part of their 1966 album Drinkin' and Courtin'. Luke Kelly, lead singer of the Irish band, claimed in live performances that the song was a "love song" to Salford.

Chart performance for "Dirty Old Town" by the Dubliners
Chart (1968)	Peak position
Ireland (IRMA)	10

== The Pogues version ==
"Dirty Old Town"

Single by the Pogues

from the album Rum Sodomy & the Lash
- Released: 1985
- Genre: Celtic rock
- Length: 3:45
- Label: Stiff
- Songwriter: Ewan MacColl
- Producer: Elvis Costello

The Pogues singles chronology
"Sally MacLennane" (1985)	"Dirty Old Town" (1985)	"Haunted" (1986)

Music video
- "Dirty Old Town" by the Pogues on YouTube

Released on Rum Sodomy & the Lash in 1985, the Pogues' version reached number 62 in the UK and 27 in the Irish charts when released as a single. It has been certified Silver for sales.

The Pogues' version of the song is played during the team walk-on at Salford City FC.

=== Reception ===
John Leland at Spin called the song, "a sparse melancholy reminiscence of love in an industrial sewer. The Pogues are a crudely affecting bunch of romantics." AllMusic said, "while Shane MacGowan may not have written "Dirty Old Town", his wrought, emotionally compelling vocals made [it] his from then on."

== Rod Stewart version ==
British rock singer Rod Stewart included the song in his first solo album, "An Old Raincoat Won't Ever Let You Down" and performed it in live concerts as recently as 2019.

== Certifications ==
Certifications for "Dirty Old Town"
Region	Certification	Certified units/sales
New Zealand (RMNZ) The Pogues version	Platinum	30,000^{‡}
United Kingdom (BPI) The Pogues version	Gold	400,000^{‡}
^{‡} Sales+streaming figures based on certification alone.
