= Hometown! =

Live album by The Dubliners
- Released: 1972
- Recorded: 1972
- Venue: National Stadium, Dublin
- Genre: Irish folk
- Label: EMI/Columbia
- Producer: Phil Coulter

The Dubliners chronology
Revolution (1970)	Hometown! (1972)	Double Dubliners (1972)

Hometown! is a live album by The Dubliners recorded and released in 1972. Its release was short-lived because "Raglan Road" was split across both sides of the original LP. Recorded at the National Stadium in Dublin, it featured the original members. The album included songs that had not previously been recorded.

== Track listing ==
=== Side One ===
1. "Molly Maguires"
2. "Take It Down from the Mast"
3. "Sons of Roisin"
4. "Barney's Mozart"
5. "Raglan Road (Part 1)"

=== Side Two ===
1. "Raglan Road (Part 2)"
2. "The Comical Genius"
3. "The Breeze (Heathery Breeze)"
4. "Octopus Jig"
5. "Kimmage"
6. "Hand Me Down My Bible"
7. "Monto"
