= The Rebel (poem) =

- by Pádraig Pearse
- Publication date: c. 1915
- Lines: 48

Full text
- The Rebel (Pearse) at Wikisource

"The Rebel" is a poem written by Irish revolutionary Pádraig Pearse with a theme of rebellion and insurrection. He would later play a leading role in the Easter Rising of 1916, for which he would be executed by British forces.
