= Dicey Reilly =

Song

Dicey Reilly is a traditional Irish song. It tells the tale of an alcoholic woman from Dublin. There are various versions of the song with additional verses added by many artists, including one by Dominic Behan which suggests that Dicey is a sex worker, and one by Ronnie Drew in which she appears in court.
