= Peggy Gordon =

Anglosphere folk song

"Peggy Gordon" is a folk song that has become popular in many English-speaking countries.

== History ==
In the 1820s and early 1830s, a song called "Peggy Gordon" was published on American song-sheets: in New York and in Boston (available at the libraries of Brown University, RI and the New York Historical Society).

A couple of decades later, a song called "Peggy Gordon" was mentioned in Fitz-Hugh Ludlow's story The Primpenny Family. The story was published in serial form in the magazine Vanity Fair in 1861, mentioning the song in chapter VI in a conversation between Mr. Kineboy and Miss Primpenny:

"Did ye ever hear tell o' Peggy Gordon, my dear?" "I have read about it, and often thought I'd like to hear it," said Miss Primpenny with enthusiasm.
"What key do you sing it in? I'll play the accompaniment for you."

The chorus of Kineboy's performance is very similar to the chorus of present-day versions:

Oh, Peggy Gordon, you are my darlin'!
Come sit you daown by the side o' me!
And tell to me the ver-eye reason,
Why I am slighted so by th-e-e-e-e-e-e!

Another version of this song, in the form of a vaudeville song called Sweet Maggie Gordon, was published in New York from 1880. The song tells a story of a man who is madly in love with a woman of this name and how he longs to be with her.

In 1938, a song called Sweet Peggy Gordon was recorded by Herbert Halpert in Sloatsburg, New York. The name of the singer was Mort Montonyea.

Versions were collected in Canada in the 1950s and 1960s in Canada, mainly in Nova Scotia.

== Folk song tradition ==
The song “Peggy Gordon” has been recorded by many artists. One of the first commercial recordings was by Canadian folk singer Alan Mills in 1959 on the album Canadian Folksong. It was recorded by Charles Jordan on the 9-LP set Canadian Folk songs, A Centennial Collection in 1966, issued in 1967. Also around this time it was recorded by Toronto folk singer Bonnie Dobson.

The song was featured in the film The Proposition, sung by one of the Irish outlaws.

The Melvins’ cover of the song on their 2010 album, The Bride Screamed Murder, was described as "a serenely bizarre version of the Canadian folk song".

Being a well-documented song and publicised by English Folk Dance and Song Society, and Mainly Norfolk, the song was recorded by Jon Boden and Oli Steadman for inclusion in their respective lists of daily folk songs "A Folk Song a Day" and "365 Days Of Folk".

== Covers ==
- Liam Clancy The Clancy Brothers and Tommy Makem: In Concert 1967 (Columbia Records LP)
- The Dubliners Live at the Albert Hall 1969 (Major Minor SMLP 44 LP)
- John Allan Cameron Here Comes John Allan Cameron 1969
- The Quare Fellas (Dublin City Ramblers) A Fond Tale 1970 (CBS 63997 LP)
- Ryan's Fancy Curraghs, Minstrels, Rocks and Whiskey 1971 (Gunn GBY LP 1003 LP)
- The Corries Sound the Pibroch 1972
- Happy Traum Relax Your Mind 1975
- Paddy Reilly At Home with Paddy Reilly
- Pecker Dunne The Tinkerman (1987, re-released 2001)
- Buddy Wasisname Miracle Cure (1992)
- Sinéad O'Connor Sean-Nós Nua 2002
- Brian Kennedy On Song 2 2005 (CURCD-160)
- The Chieftains (with the Secret Sisters) Voice of Ages
- The Corrs Home 2005
- Marc Gunn
- The High Kings Friends for life 2013
- Roddy Campbell- Peigi Ghordain (in Scots Gaelic) -Back To Barra (2005)
- Melvins The Bride Screamed Murder (2010)
