= Weela Weela Walya =

Irish children's song

"Weela Weela Walya", also called "Weila Waile", "Wella Wallia" or "The River Saile", is an Irish schoolyard song that tells the story of an infanticide in a light-hearted way. It was popularised in the 1960s by Irish folk bands the Dubliners and the Clancy Brothers.

== Origin ==
The song is a variation of a murder ballad called "The Cruel Mother" or "The Greenwood Side" (Child 20, Roud 9), but in an up-tempo version sung by children in the schoolyard. As in several versions of "The Cruel Mother", the woman stabs the baby in the heart using "a penknife long and sharp," but whereas in "The Cruel Mother" the woman is visited by the ghosts of the children she killed, in "Weela Weela Walya" it is "two policeman and a man" (two uniformed police and a detective, or possibly a psychiatrist), who come to her door and arrest her for the murder. Neither this version nor any adult Irish version is found in Child's English and Scottish Popular Ballads, but it is listed in the Roud Folk Song Index. The song was popular with Irish Traveller children. A similar song, "Old Mother Lee", is sung in playgrounds in Liverpool.

The refrain "Weile Weile Waile" (/ˈwiːljæ ˈwiːljæ ˈwɔːl.jæ/) is a version of the Middle English expression of grief "wellaway!" (Old English wā lā wā, "woe, la!, woe).

The name "Saile" comes from the Irish word "salach" meaning dirty. It's an alternate name for the river Poddle which runs from the Dublin hills to join the river Liffey. Historically it was used for industry and also an open sewer and was very dirty (Salach). There are some old stories about a child's body being found in the river. The name Saile may also come from the Irish “sáile” which means salt-water or seawater.

== Performances ==
The song was recorded by the Clancy Brothers as "Wella Wallia" on Recorded Live in Ireland (1965), and as "Weila Waile" by the Dubliners on their 1967 album A Drop of the Hard Stuff. It was a popular part of the Dubliners' repertoire for decades, appearing on several of their live albums, and was sung at the funeral of Ronnie Drew in 2008. Virgin Prunes' singers Guggi and Gavin Friday sang a version of the song in the 1981 video Sons Find Devils, titled "Bernie and Attricia Sing" on the related live album.

== Lyrics ==
There was an old woman and she lived in the woods
Weela Weela Walya
There was an old woman and she lived in the woods
Down by the river Saile. (Note: /ˈsɔːl.jæ/. From the Irish salach ("dirty"), it was a former nickname for the River Poddle in Dublin.)

She had a baby three months old
Weela Weela Walya
She had a baby three months old
Down by the river Saile.

She had a penknife long and sharp
Weela Weela Walya
She had a penknife long and sharp
Down by the river Saile.

She stuck the penknife in the baby's heart
Weela Weela Walya
She stuck the penknife in the baby's heart
Down by the river Saile.

Three loud knocks came a'knocking on the door
Weela Weela Walya
Three loud knocks came a'knocking on the door
Down by the river Saile.

Two policemen and a man
Weela Weela Walya
Two policemen and a man
Down by the river Saile.

"Are you the woman that killed the child?"
Weela Weela Walya
"Are you the woman that killed the child?"
Down by the river Saile.

"I am the woman that killed the child"
Weela Weela Walya
"I am the woman that killed the child"
Down by the river Saile.

They took her away and they put her in jail
Weela Weela Walya
They took her away and they put her in jail
Down by the river Saile.

Alternate Ending:
They took her up and strung her by the neck
Weela Weela Walya
They took her up and strung her by the neck
Down by the river Saile.

And that was the end of the woman in the woods
Weela Weela Walya
And that was the end of the woman in the woods
Down by the river Saile.

== In culture ==
The song's morbid theme of infanticide, juxtaposed with its childish nature, has made it popular as a cultural reference. It is mentioned in Sebastian Barry's novel Annie Dunne, Hannah Kent's novel The Good People, Bernard MacLaverty 's Grace Notes and Daniel Shortell's novel th!s, and forms a substantial inspiration for the film The Hole in the Ground, which also features Lisa Hannigan's version of the song. The song features in the 2023 film The Miracle Club, where it introduces discussion of abortion experiences. A version of this song is sung by Liam Neeson in the third chapter ("Meal Ticket") of the 2018 American Western anthology film, The Ballad of Buster Scruggs.
