= Whiskey in the Jar =

Irish traditional song

- Composed: Circa 17th century

"Whiskey in the Jar"

Single by the Dubliners

from the album More of the Hard Stuff
- Released: 1968
- Genre: Irish folk music
- Length: 3:01
- Label: Major Minor
- Songwriter: Trad. arr. the Dubliners
- Producer: Tommy Scott

"Whiskey in the Jar" (Roud 533) is an Irish traditional song set in the southern mountains of Ireland, often with specific mention of counties Cork and Kerry. The song, about a rapparee (highwayman) who is betrayed by his wife or lover, is one of the most widely performed traditional Irish songs and has been recorded by numerous artists since the 1950s.

The song first gained wide exposure when Irish folk band the Dubliners performed it internationally as a signature song and recorded it on three albums in the 1960s. In the U.S., the song was popularised by the Highwaymen, who recorded it on their 1962 album Encore. Irish rock band Thin Lizzy hit the Irish and British pop charts with the song in 1973. In 1990, the Dubliners re-recorded the song with the Pogues with a faster rockish version charting at No. 63 in the UK. American metal band Metallica in 1998 played a version very similar to that of Thin Lizzy's, though with a heavier sound, winning a Grammy for the song in 2000 for Best Hard Rock Performance.

== Story ==
"Whiskey in the Jar" is the tale of a highwayman or footpad who, after robbing a military or government official, is betrayed by a woman; whether she is his wife or sweetheart is not made clear. Various versions of the song take place in Kerry, Kilmoganny, Cork, Sligo Town, and other locations throughout Ireland. It is also sometimes placed in the American South, in various places among the Ozarks or Appalachians, possibly due to Irish settlement in these places. Names in the song change, and the official can be a captain or a colonel, called Farrell or Pepper among other names. The protagonist's wife or lover is sometimes called Molly, Jenny, Emzy, or Ginny among various other names. The details of the betrayal also differ, with the wife in some versions betraying him to the person he robbed and replacing his ammunition with sand or water.

== History ==
The song's exact origins are unknown. A number of its lines and the general plot resemble those of a contemporary broadside ballad "Patrick Fleming" (also called "Patrick Flemmen he was a Valiant Soldier") about Irish highwayman Patrick Fleming, who was executed in 1650.

In the book The Folk Songs of North America, folk music historian Alan Lomax suggests that the song originated in the 17th century and that John Gay's 1728 The Beggar's Opera was inspired by Gay hearing an Irish ballad-monger singing "Whiskey in the Jar". In regard to the history of the song, Lomax states, "The folk of seventeenth century Britain liked and admired their local highwaymen; and in Ireland (or Scotland) where the gentlemen of the roads robbed English landlords, they were regarded as national patriots. Such feelings inspired this rollicking ballad."

At some point, the song came to the United States and was a favourite in Colonial America because of its irreverent attitude toward British officials. The American versions are sometimes set in America and deal with American characters. One such version from Massachusetts is about Alan McCollister, an Irish-American soldier who is sentenced to death by hanging for robbing British officials.

The song appeared in a form close to its modern version in a precursor called "The Sporting Hero, or, Whiskey in the Bar" in a mid-1850s broadsheet. In his book Irish Street Ballads, the song collector Colm Ó Lochlainn described how his mother learnt "Whiskey in the Jar" in Limerick in 1870 from a man called Buckley who came from Cork. When Ó Lochlainn included the song in Irish Street Ballads, he wrote down the lyrics from memory as he had learnt them from his mother. He called the song "There's Whiskey in the Jar", and the lyrics are virtually identical to the version that was used by Irish bands in the 1960s such as the Dubliners. The Ó Lochlainn version refers to the "far fam'd Kerry mountain" rather than the Cork and Kerry mountains, as appears in some versions.

The song also appears under the title "There's Whiskey in the Jar" in the Joyce collection, but that only includes the melody line without any lyrics. Versions of the song were collected in the 1920s in Northern Ireland by song collector Sam Henry. It is Roud Folk Song Index no. 533. It has also been described as an Irish drinking song.

== Variations ==
"Whiskey in the Jar"

Single by Thin Lizzy

from the album Vagabonds of the Western World (1991 re-issue)
- B-side: "Black Boys on the Corner"
- Released: 3 November 1972
- Recorded: 23–25 September 1972
- Studio: Decca 4
- Genre: Rock
- Length: 5:45 (album version); 3:46 (single version)
- Label: Decca
- Songwriters: Trad. arr. Eric Bell, Brian Downey, Phil Lynott
- Producers: Nick Tauber, Derek Varnals

Thin Lizzy singles chronology
"The Farmer" (1970)	"Whiskey in the Jar" (1972)	"Randolph's Tango" (1973)

"Whiskey in the Jar"

Single by the Pogues and the Dubliners
- A-side: "Jack's Heroes"
- Released: 1990
- Songwriter: Traditional

"Whiskey in the Jar"

Single by Metallica

from the album Garage Inc.
- B-side: "The Small Hours" (live); "Killing Time" (live)
- Released: 1 February 1999
- Genre: Heavy metal
- Length: 5:05
- Label: Vertigo; Elektra
- Songwriter: Traditional
- Producers: Bob Rock; James Hetfield; Lars Ulrich; Mark Whitaker

Metallica singles chronology
"Turn the Page" (1998)	"Whiskey in the Jar" (1999)	"Die, Die My Darling" (1999)

Music video
- "Whiskey in the Jar" on YouTube

"Whiskey in the Jar" is sung with many variants on locations and names, including a version by Jerry Garcia of the Grateful Dead with mandolinist David Grisman; a version by the Dubliners (which is often sung in Irish traditional music sessions around the world); a rock version sung by Thin Lizzy; and a heavy metal version (inspired by Thin Lizzy's performance of the song) by Metallica.

There is also a song about Irish troops in the American Civil War called "We'll Fight for Uncle Sam", which is sung in the same tune of "Whiskey in the Jar".

An American variation of the song, titled "Bold Lovell", has been performed by Jim Moray among others.

=== Field recordings ===
- Lena Bourne Fish of East Jaffrey, New Hampshire, United States, 1940, recorded by Frank and Anne Warner
- Séamus Ennis of Dublin, Ireland, World Library of Folk and Primitive Music, Vol. 2: Ireland 1951, recorded by Alan Lomax
- Mary Byrnes of Springside near Orange, New South Wales, Australia, 1954/1955, recorded by John Meredith
- Sarah Ogan Gunning of Knox County, Kentucky, United States, 1974, recorded by Mark Wilson

=== Recordings ===
Partial discography:

- Burl Ives – Songs of Ireland (1958), as "Kilgary Mountain"
- The Highwaymen – Encore (1962)
- The Limeliters – Sing Out! (1962), as "Kilgary Mountain"
- Peter, Paul and Mary – A Song Will Rise (1965), as "Gilgarra Mountain"
- The Dubliners – 1967 (album), 1968 (single), 1969 (album)
- Thin Lizzy – November 1972 (Single), August 1976 (album)
- The Pogues – 1990, with the Dubliners
- Jerry Garcia, David Grisman – Shady Grove (1996)
- Metallica – Garage Inc. (1998)

The song has also been recorded by singers and folk groups such as Roger Whittaker, the Irish Rovers, Seven Nations, Off Kilter, King Creosote, Brobdingnagian Bards, Charlie Zahm, and Christy Moore.

Liam Clancy recorded the song with his son and nephew on Clancy, O'Connell & Clancy in 1997, and Tommy Makem recorded it on The Song Tradition in 1998. The High Kings, featuring Bobby Clancy's son Finbarr, released a version in February 2011.

Thin Lizzy's 1972 single (bonus track on Vagabonds of the Western World [1991 edition]) stayed at the top of the Irish charts for 17 weeks, and the British release stayed in the top 30 for 12 weeks, peaking at No. 6, in 1973. This version has since been covered by U2, Pulp (first released on a 1996 various artist compilation album Childline and later on deluxe edition of Different Class in 2006), Smokie, Metallica (Garage Inc. 1998, which won a Grammy), Belle and Sebastian (The Blues Are Still Blue EP 2006), Gary Moore (2006), Nicky Moore (Top Musicians Play Thin Lizzy 2008), Simple Minds (Searching for the Lost Boys 2009), and Israeli musician Izhar Ashdot. The song is also on the Grateful Dead live compilation So Many Roads disc five.

Jerry Garcia and David Grisman recorded a bluegrass version for the album Shady Grove. It has also been performed by the Scarecrows bluegrass band and the Dutch band Blue Grass Boogiemen.

Icelandic folk band Þrjú á palli (Three On The Podium) recorded it in 1971 as "Lífið Er Lotterí (Life Is A Lottery)" with lyrics by Jónas Árnason. Lillebjørn Nilsen adapted it to Norwegian, as "Svikefulle Mari (Fraudulent Mari)", on his 1971 album Tilbake (Back). Finnish band Eläkeläiset (The Retired) recorded a humppa version as the title track of their 1997 album Humppamaratooni (Jump Marathon). In 2007 the Lars Lilholt Band made a Danish version, "Gi (Give)' Mig Whiskey in the Jar", for the album Smukkere Med Tiden (More Beautiful With Time). Estonian band Poisikõsõ recorded "Hans'a Õuhkaga" on the album Tii Päält Iist in 2007.

In 1966, the Yarkon Bridge Trio, an Israeli singing group, recorded a song named "Siman Sheata Tsair" ("It Is a Sign That You Are Young") set to the melody of "Whiskey in the Jar"; the song became a hit and was later covered by various artists, notably by Gidi Gov.

== Charts ==
=== Thin Lizzy version ===
==== Weekly charts ====
Chart (1972–1973)	Peak position
Australian Singles (Kent Music Report)	40
Belgium (Ultratop 50 Flanders)	27
Belgium (Ultratop 50 Wallonia)	35
Ireland (IRMA)	1
Netherlands (Dutch Top 40)	20
Netherlands (Single Top 100)	15
New Zealand (Listener)	13
UK Singles (Official Charts)	6
West Germany (GfK)	7

==== Year-end charts ====
Chart (1973)	Position
West Germany (Media Control)	18

=== The Dubliners and Pogues version ===
Chart (1990)	Peak position
UK Singles (Official Charts)	63

=== Metallica version ===
==== Weekly charts ====
Chart (1999–2008)	Peak position
Australia (ARIA)	14
Austria (Ö3 Austria Top 40)	30
Belgium (Ultratop 50 Flanders)	48
Canada Rock/Alternative (RPM)	5
Europe (Eurochart Hot 100)	40
Finland (Suomen virallinen lista)	16
Germany (GfK)	23
Greece (IFPI)	7
Hungary (Mahasz)	3
Ireland (IRMA)	17
Netherlands (Single Top 100)	47
New Zealand (Recorded Music NZ)	41
Norway (VG-lista)	4
Scottish Singles Sales (Official Charts)	22
Sweden (Sverigetopplistan)	15
Switzerland (Schweizer Hitparade)	55
UK Singles (Official Charts)	29
UK Rock & Metal (Official Charts)	1
US Bubbling Under Hot 100 (Billboard)	24
US Mainstream Rock (Billboard)	4

==== Year-end charts ====
Chart (1999)	Position
Canada Rock/Alternative (RPM)	30
Germany (Media Control)	97
Romania (Romanian Top 100)	82
Sweden (Hitlistan)	71
US Mainstream Rock Tracks (Billboard)	8

== Certifications ==
=== Thin Lizzy version ===
Region	Certification	Certified units/sales
United Kingdom (BPI)	Silver	250,000^{^}
^{^} Shipments figures based on certification alone.

=== The Dubliners version ===
Region	Certification	Certified units/sales
United Kingdom (BPI)	Gold	400,000^{‡}
^{‡} Sales+streaming figures based on certification alone.

=== Metallica version ===
Region	Certification	Certified units/sales
Australia (ARIA)	2× Platinum	140,000^{‡}
Denmark (IFPI Danmark)	Platinum	90,000^{‡}
Germany (BVMI)	Gold	250,000^{‡}
Norway (IFPI Norway)	Gold	
Spain (Promusicae)	Gold	30,000^{‡}
Sweden (GLF)	Gold	15,000^{^}
United Kingdom (BPI)	Gold	400,000^{‡}
^{^} Shipments figures based on certification alone.^{‡} Sales+streaming figures based on certification alone.
