= The Auld Triangle =

Song

"The Auld Triangle" is a song by Dick Shannon, often attributed to Brendan Behan, who made it famous when he included it in his 1954 play The Quare Fellow. He first performed it publicly in 1952 on the RTÉ radio programme 'The Ballad Maker's Saturday Night', produced by Mícheál Ó hAodha. Behan's biographer, Michael O'Sullivan, recorded, 'It has been believed for many years that Brendan wrote that famous prison song but Mícheál Ó hAodha says he never laid claim to authorship. Indeed he asked him to send a copyright to another Dubliner, Dick Shannon.' When he recorded the song for Brendan Behan Sings Irish Folksongs and Ballads (Spoken Arts 1960), Behan introduced it with these words: 'This song was written by a person who will never hear it recorded, because he's not in possession of a gramophone. He's ... he's ... pretty much of a tramp.'

Shannon's authorship was asserted by his relatives in discussions on the Mudcat Cafe folksong forum. Here, Deasún ÓSeanáin, his nephew, recorded: 'My father Thomas Shannon told me as far back as the 1950s that Dickey had written it. Dickey is buried in Manchester. It would be nice to see a plaque erected indicating him as the author.' Shannon's grandson Tom Neary posted: 'I can confirm that it was indeed Dicky Shannon who penned the song for Behan. Brendan and Dicky were very close pals, as well as drinking mates....I have many stories of their escapades together....Brendan always credited Dicky for the song because they were great pals, however, I can verify that Dicky never received a penny in royalties and neither did his family...I must also point out that grandad was not in fact a tramp, but was a highly articulate man with a very dry sense of humour, which could cut you to the quick without degrading you. He was also a very tough man who had literally fought his way through life in the Liberties.'

The first commercial recording was by Brendan's brother Dominic Behan on his 1958 Topic album Irish Songs. On the liner notes, he wrote, 'The Old Triangle is a song of Mountjoy Prison and was made popular in the play "The Quare Fella" by Brendan Behan of Dublin.'

The song was later made famous by Luke Kelly, Ronnie Drew and The Dubliners in the late 1960s, and was revived for a new audience by Irish rock band The Pogues on their 1984 album Red Roses for Me.

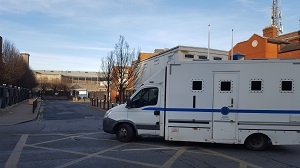
The Quare Fellow takes place in Mountjoy prison during the early 1950s

The song has become also a football chant, sung by fans of the Dublin Bohemian Football Club whose ground is near the prison. In 2021, Ronan Burtenshaw reported, 'Recently, the club's fans have gone viral for their renditions of ‘The Auld Triangle'.'

== Content ==
The song is used to introduce the play, a story about the occurrences in a prison (in real life Mountjoy Prison where Behan had once been lodged) the day a convict is set to be executed. The triangle in the title refers to the large metal triangle which was beaten daily in Mountjoy Prison to waken the inmates ("The Auld Triangle goes Jingle Jangle"). The triangle still hangs in the prison at the centre where the wings meet on a metal gate. It is no longer used, though the hammer to beat it is mounted beside it. In the original play by Brendan Behan, the song is written as the "old triangle" not "auld triangle".

The triangle was rung regularly to signify points in the prison's routine.

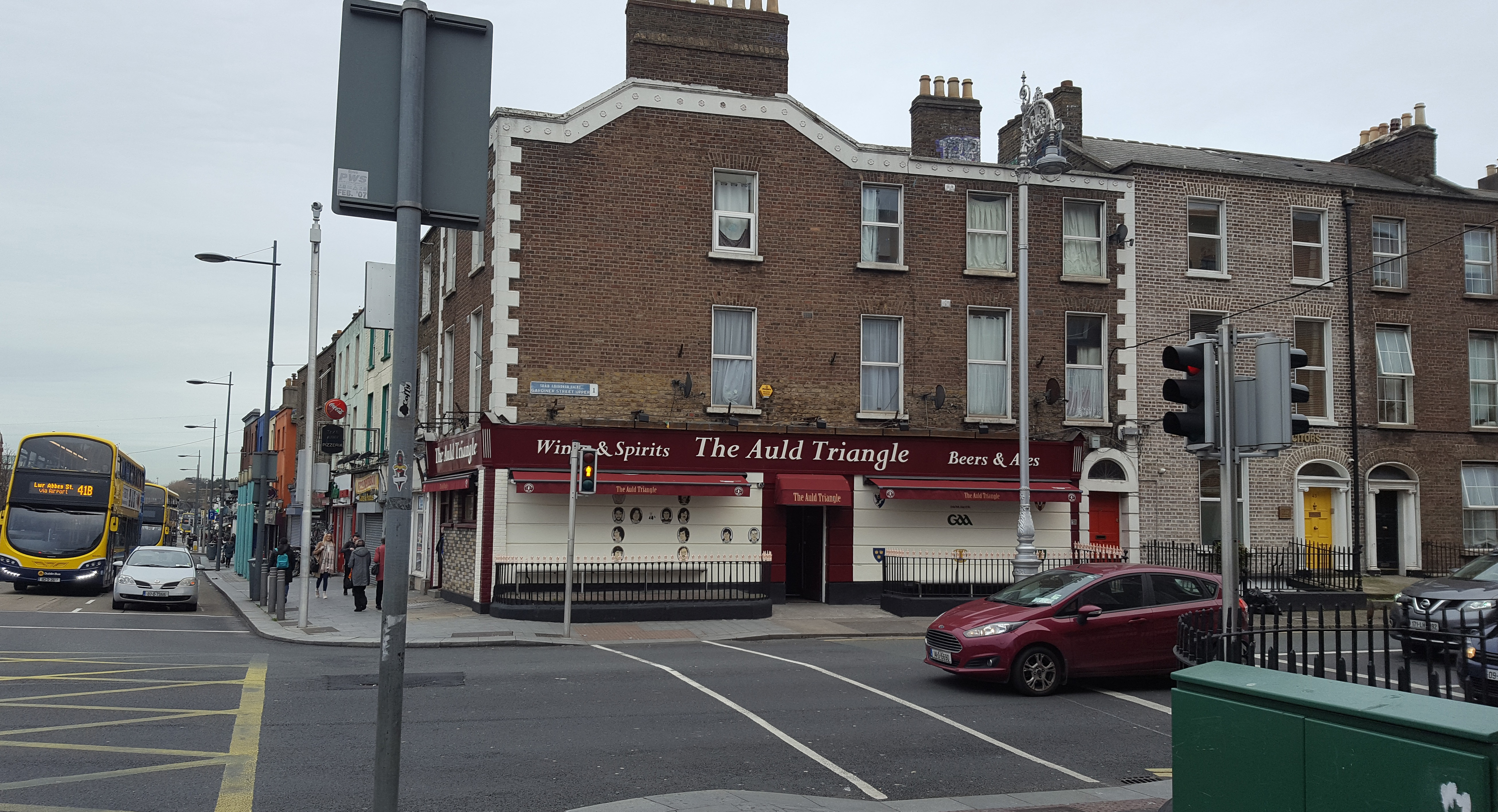
The Auld Triangle bar on Dorset Street. This pub is notable for having art on its outside walls paying homage to Irish Republican Hunger Strikers from the second half of the 20th century

As with many Irish ballads, the lyrics have been changed with each passing cover. For example, the Dropkick Murphys recording condenses the structure into a three-lyric section song with a chorus based on the last two lines of each stanza in the original.

== Recordings ==
This song has been recorded by a number of artists.

Artist, album	Year
Bert Jansch for his album The Black Swan	2006
Blackthorn on their album Nil na La	1997
Bob Dylan and The Band also recorded a rendition of the song during their Basement Tapes sessions. This recording is available on bootleg recordings but does not appear on the official The Basement Tapes album released in 1975. It finally appeared in 2014 on the official release, The Bootleg Series Vol. 11: The Basement Tapes Complete.	1967
Brendan Behan, Brendan Behan Sings Irish Folksongs and Ballads, Spoken Arts	1960
Cat Power for her EP Dark End of the Street	2008
Chris Thile, Chris Eldridge, Marcus Mumford, Justin Timberlake and Gabe Witcher for the soundtrack to the Coen Brothers' film Inside Llewyn Davis	2013
Dominic Behan, Irish Songs (Recalled by Dominic Behan), Topic	1958
Glen Hansard, lead singer of The Frames, and Damien Dempsey, to raise funds for the charity Society of Saint Vincent de Paul.	2010
Ian & Sylvia as "The Royal Canal" for their Four Strong Winds album	1963
Jeff Tweedy on his tour DVD Sunken Treasure: Live in the Pacific Northwest	2006
Liam Clancy as "Royal Canal" on his self-titled 1965 album (reissued with additional tracksas Irish Troubadour)	1999
Lifvens Vänner Swedish band recorded this song for their album "Lifvs Levenes"	1997
Oysterband for their 'Alive and Acoustic' recording	1998
Patrick Clifford, on Chance of a Start	2012
Ronnie Drew, on his self-titled solo album	1975
Ryan Boldt on his album Broadside Ballads	2014
The Clancy Brothers & Tommy Makem on Ain't It Grand Boys	(Recorded 1964, released 1995, as "Royal Canal") and The Bold Fenian Men (1969, as "The Old Triangle")
Colm R. McGuinness released a performance of the song on YouTube in May 2021; it was released in May 2022 as part of his 'Don't Trad On Me' album.	2021/2022

== Notable performances ==
The Doug Anthony Allstars performed a medley (a variation on Fred Geis's "Lament for Brendan Behan" prefacing "The Auld Triangle") on the Australian ABC program The Big Gig in the late 1980s.

The Frames performed it as the final song of a two-hour concert at the Vic Theater in Chicago on 23 November 2010. They performed the song live on RTÉ television's The Saturday Night Show on 18 December of the same year. U2 played a live cover version at Croke Park, Dublin on 24 July 2009 as part of the 360 tour. Bono joined lead singer Glen Hansard on 8 May 2012 in New York City's The Living Room venue to perform the song. Following Hansard's death in 2026, "The Auld Triangle" was sung by mourners, including Bono, Eddie Vedder, Damien Rice, Lisa Hannigan, Markéta Irglová, Liam Ó Maonlaí and members of The Frames, as his funeral procession left St Patrick's Cathedral, Dublin. The song was also sung by members of the public in tribute in the days following his death.

At the Ceiliúradh (celebration) at Royal Albert Hall on 10 April 2014, it was sung by a collection of performers including Glen Hansard, Lisa Hannigan, Elvis Costello, Conor O’Brien (of Villagers), Paul Brady, Imelda May, John Sheahan, Dónal Lunny, Andy Irvine and The Gloaming.
