= Luke Kelly =

Irish folk singer (1940–1984)

- Kelly in 1967

Background information
- Born: 17 November 1940; Sheriff Street, Dublin, Ireland
- Died: 30 January 1984 (aged 43) Dublin, Ireland
- Genre: Irish folk
- Occupations: Singer; folk musician; banjoist; actor
- Instruments: Vocals; banjo; guitar
- Years active: 1962–1984
- Formerly of: The Dubliners

Luke Kelly (17 November 1940 – 30 January 1984) was an Irish singer, folk musician and actor from Dublin, Ireland. Born into a working-class household in the city, he moved to England in his late teens and became involved in the folk music revival there. After returning to Dublin in the early 1960s, he co-founded the Dubliners in 1962.

== Early life ==
Luke Kelly was born on 17 November 1940, one of six children of Luke Kelly and Julia Fleming, a working‑class couple from Sheriff Street in Dublin, Ireland. His maternal grandmother Elizabeth McDonald, who emigrated to Ireland from Scotland, lived with the Kelly family until her death in 1953. Kelly's father, who was also named Luke, was wounded as a child when a detachment of soldiers from the King's Own Scottish Borderers opened fire on a Dublin crowd on 26 July 1914 in what became known as the Bachelor's Walk massacre. He was taken to Jervis Street Hospital with a bullet wound to the lung and, although not expected to recover, he overcame his injuries.

After growing up, Kelly's father worked for most of his adult life at a Jacob's biscuit factory and enjoyed playing football. Kelly's father was a keen singer: Kelly's brother Paddy later recalled that "he had this talent...to sing negro spirituals by people like Paul Robeson, we used to sit around and join in – that was our entertainment". After Dublin Corporation demolished Lattimore Cottages in 1942, the Kellys became the first family to move into the St. Laurence O'Toole flats, where Kelly spent most of his childhood, although the family were forced to move by a fire in 1953 and settled in the Whitehall area. Both Kelly and Paddy played club Gaelic football and soccer as children.

Kelly left school at 13, and after working various jobs for several years, he went to England in 1958. While working as a steel fixer with his brother Paddy on a building site in Wolverhampton, he was apparently sacked after asking for higher pay. He worked a number of odd jobs, including a period as a vacuum cleaner salesman. Describing himself as a beatnik, he travelled around Northern England in search of work, summarising his life in this period as "cleaning lavatories, cleaning windows, cleaning railways, but very rarely cleaning my face".

== Musical beginnings ==
Kelly had been interested in music during his teenage years: he regularly attended céilithe with his sister Mona and listened to American vocalists including Fats Domino, Al Jolson, Frank Sinatra and Perry Como. He also had an interest in theatre and musicals, being involved with the staging of plays by Dublin's Marian Arts Society.

The first folk club he came across was in the Bridge Hotel, Newcastle upon Tyne in early 1960. Having already acquired a banjo, he started memorising songs. In Leeds he brought his banjo to sessions in McReady's pub. The folk revival was under way in England: at the centre of it was Ewan MacColl, who scripted a radio programme called Ballads and Blues. A revival in the skiffle genre also injected a certain energy into folk singing at the time.

Kelly started busking. On a trip home, he went to a fleadh cheoil in Milltown Malbay on the advice of Johnny Moynihan. He listened to recordings of Woody Guthrie and Pete Seeger. He also developed his political convictions which, as Ronnie Drew pointed out after his death, he maintained throughout his life. As Drew also pointed out, he "learned to sing with perfect diction".

Kelly befriended Sean Mulready in Birmingham and lived in his home for a period. Mulready was a teacher who was forced from his job in Dublin because of his communist beliefs. Mulready had strong music connections; a sister, Kathleen Moynihan, was a founding member of Comhaltas Ceoltóirí Éireann, and he was related by marriage to Festy Conlon, the County Galway whistle player. Mulready's brother-in-law, Ned Stapleton, taught Kelly "The Rocky Road to Dublin". During this period, he studied literature and politics under the tutelage of Mulready, his wife Mollie, and Marxist classicist George Derwent Thomson: Kelly later stated that his interest in music developed alongside his interest in politics.

Kelly bought his first banjo, which had five strings and a long neck, and played it in the style of Pete Seeger and Tommy Makem. During this period, Kelly developed a habit of reading and also began playing golf on one of Birmingham's municipal courses. He became involved in the Jug O'Punch folk club run by Ian Campbell. He befriended Dominic Behan, and they performed in folk clubs and Irish pubs from London to Glasgow. In London pubs such as "The Favourite", he would hear street singer Margaret Barry and musicians in exile like Roger Sherlock, Seamus Ennis, Bobby Casey and Mairtín Byrnes.

Kelly was by now active in the Connolly Association, a left-wing grouping strongest among the emigres in England, and he also joined the Young Communist League: he toured Irish pubs playing his set and selling the Connolly Association's newspaper The Irish Democrat. By 1962, George Derwent Thomson had offered him the opportunity to further his educational and political development by attending university in Prague. However, Kelly turned down the offer in favour of pursuing his career in folk music. He also began frequenting Ewan MacColl and Peggy Seeger's Singer Club in London.

== The Dubliners ==
In 1961, a folk music revival, later termed the "ballad boom", was developing in Ireland. The Abbey Tavern sessions in Howth were the forerunner to sessions in the Hollybrook, Clontarf, the International Bar and the Grafton Cinema. Kelly returned to Dublin in 1962. O'Donoghue's Pub was already established as a session house, and soon Kelly was singing with, among others, Ronnie Drew and Barney McKenna. Other early performers at O'Donoghues included The Fureys, father and sons, John Keenan and Sean Og McKenna, Johnny Moynihan, Andy Irvine, Seamus Ennis, Willy Clancy and Mairtin Byrnes.

A concert John Molloy organised in the Hibernian Hotel led to his "Ballad Tour of Ireland" with the Ronnie Drew Ballad Group (billed in one town as the Ronnie Drew Ballet Group). This tour led to the Abbey Tavern and the Royal Marine Hotel and then to well-attended sessions in the Embankment, Tallaght. Ciarán Bourke joined the group, followed later by John Sheahan. They renamed themselves The Dubliners at Kelly's suggestion, as he was reading James Joyce's book of short stories, entitled Dubliners, at the time. Kelly was the leading vocalist for the group's eponymous debut album in 1964, which included his rendition of "The Rocky Road to Dublin". Barney McKenna later noted that Kelly was the only singer he'd heard sing it to the rhythm it was played on the fiddle.

In 1964, Kelly left the group for nearly two years and was replaced by Bobby Lynch and John Sheahan. Kelly went back to London with Deirdre O'Connell, founder of the Focus Theatre, whom he was to marry the following year, and became involved in Ewan MacColl's "gathering". The Critics, as it was called, was formed to explore folk traditions and help young singers. During this period he retained his political commitments, becoming increasingly active in the Campaign for Nuclear Disarmament. Kelly also met and befriended Michael O'Riordan, the General Secretary of the Irish Workers' Party, and the two developed a "personal-political friendship". Kelly endorsed O'Riordan for election, and held a rally in his name during campaigning in 1965. In 1965, he sang 'The Rocky Road to Dublin' with Liam Clancy on his first, self-titled solo album.

Bobby Lynch left The Dubliners, and John Sheahan and Kelly rejoined. They recorded an album in the Gate Theatre, Dublin, played at the Cambridge Folk Festival and recorded Irish Night Out, a live album with, among others, exiles Margaret Barry, Michael Gorman and Jimmy Powers. They also played a concert in the National Stadium in Dublin with Pete Seeger as special guest. The group subsequently had Top Twenty hits with "Seven Drunken Nights" and "The Black Velvet Band", appeared on The Ed Sullivan Show in 1968 and toured New Zealand and Australia. The ballad boom in Ireland was becoming increasingly commercialised, with bar and pub owners building ever larger venues for pay-in performances. Ewan MacColl and Peggy Seeger, on a visit to Dublin, expressed concern to Kelly about his drinking.

As an actor, Kelly performed in the 1969 Dublin Theatre Festival, playing the role of Sergeant Kite in The Mullingar Recruits. He later played King Herod in several runs of the musical Jesus Christ Superstar at the Gaiety Theatre.

Christy Moore and Kelly became acquainted in the 1960s. During his Planxty days, Moore got to know Kelly well. In 1972, The Dubliners themselves performed in Richard's Cork Leg, based on the "incomplete works" of Brendan Behan. In 1973, Kelly performed as King Herod in Jesus Christ Superstar.

The arrival of a new manager for The Dubliners, Derry composer Phil Coulter, resulted in a collaboration that produced three of Kelly's most notable performances: "The Town I Loved So Well", "Hand me Down my Bible", and "Scorn Not His Simplicity", a song about Phil's son who had Down syndrome. Kelly had such respect for the latter song that he only performed it once for a television recording and rarely, if ever, sang it at the Dubliners' often boisterous events.

His interpretations of "On Raglan Road" and "Scorn Not His Simplicity" became significant points of reference in Irish folk music. His version of "Raglan Road" came about when the poem's author, Patrick Kavanagh, heard him singing in a Dublin pub, and approached Kelly to say that he should sing the poem (which is set to the tune of "The Dawning of the Day").

Kelly remained a politically engaged musician, supporting the movement against South African apartheid and performing at benefit concerts for the Irish Traveller community. Many of the songs he recorded dealt with social issues, the arms race and the Cold War, trade unionism and Irish republicanism, including "The Springhill Disaster", "Joe Hill", "The Button Pusher", "Alabama 1958" and "God Save Ireland".

Kelly on stage in 1980

== Personal life ==
Kelly married Deirdre O'Connell in 1965, but they separated in the early 1970s. Kelly spent the last eight years of his life living with his partner, Madeleine Seiler, who is from Germany.

== Final years and death ==
Kelly's health deteriorated in the 1970s. He himself spoke about his problems with alcohol. On 30 June 1980, during a concert in the Cork Opera House, he collapsed on the stage. He had already suffered for some time from migraines and forgetfulness – including forgetting what country he was in whilst visiting Iceland – which had been ascribed to his intense schedule, alcohol consumption, and "party lifestyle". A brain tumour was diagnosed. Although Kelly toured with the Dubliners after enduring an operation, his health deteriorated further. He forgot lyrics and had to take longer breaks in concerts as he felt weak. In addition, following his emergency surgery after his collapse in Cork, he became more withdrawn, preferring the company of Madeleine at home to performing. On his European tour, he managed to perform with the band for most of the show in Carré for their Live in Carré album. However, in autumn 1983, he had to leave the stage in Traun, Austria and again in Mannheim, Germany. Shortly after this, he had to cancel the tour of southern Germany, and after a short stay in hospital in Heidelberg he was flown back to Dublin.

After another operation, he spent Christmas with his family but was taken into Richmond Hospital again in the New Year, where he died on 30 January 1984, aged 43. Kelly's funeral in Whitehall attracted thousands of mourners from across Ireland. His gravestone in Glasnevin Cemetery, Dublin, bears the inscription: Luke Kelly – Dubliner.

Seán Cannon took Kelly's place in The Dubliners. He had been performing with the Dubliners since 1982 as Kelly's health deteriorated.

== Legacy ==
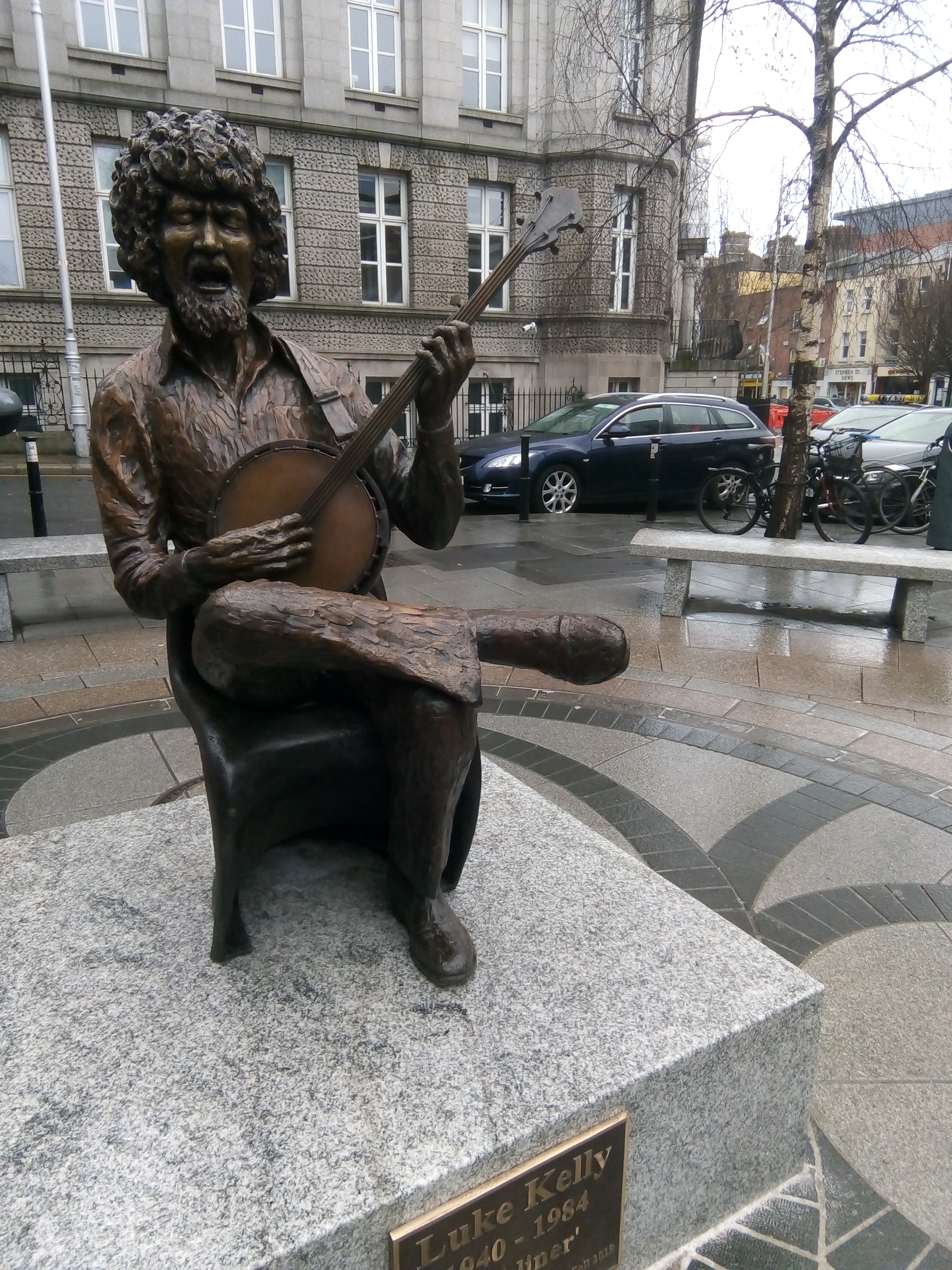
Statue on South King Street

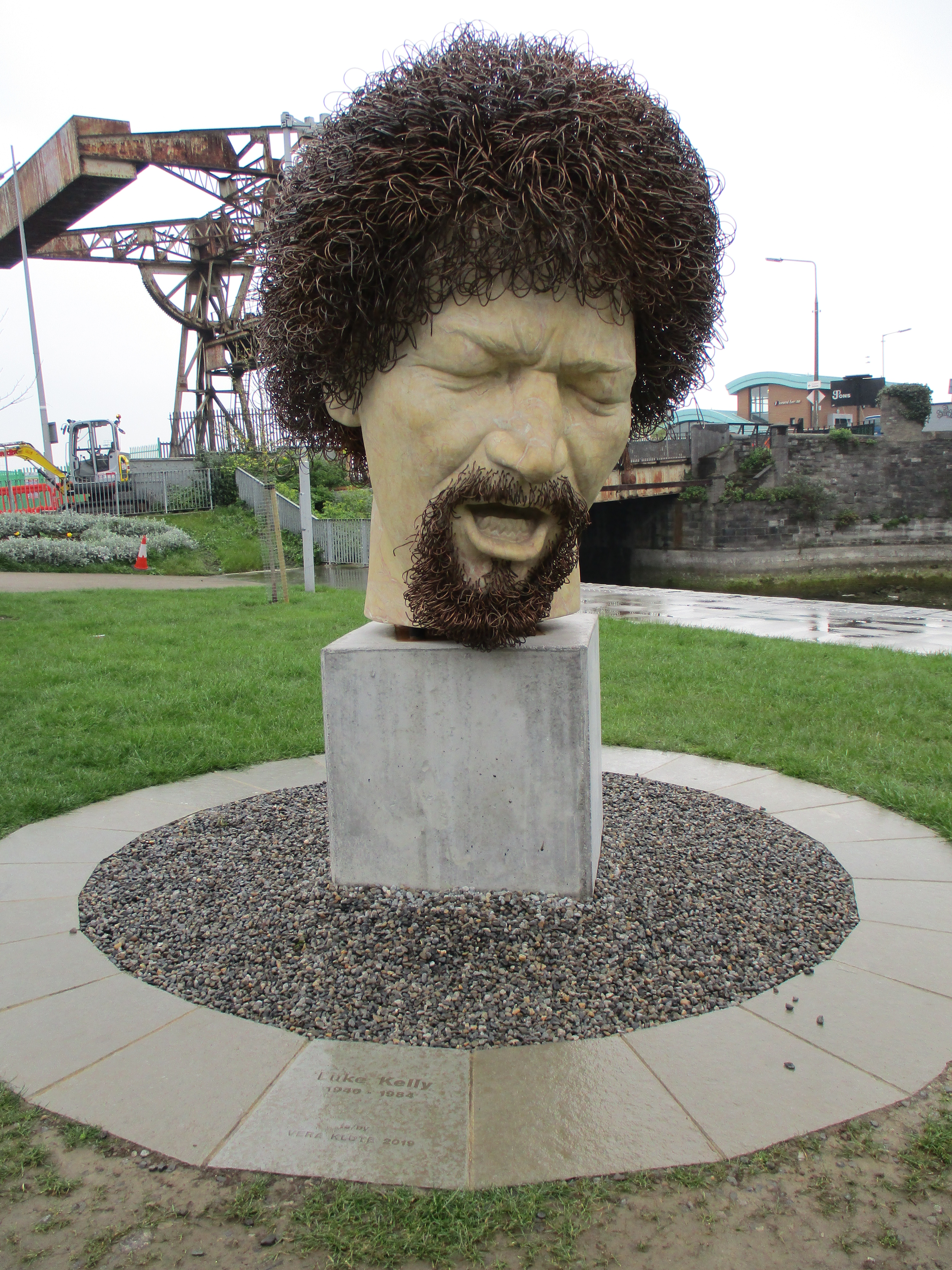
Sculpture of Luke Kelly on Sheriff Street by Vera Klute. Unveiled in 2019

Kelly's legacy and contributions to Irish music and culture have been described as "iconic" and have been captured in a number of documentaries and anthologies.

The influence of his Scottish grandmother aided Kelly's support in preserving important traditional Scottish songs such as "Mormond Braes", the Canadian folk song "Peggy Gordon", Robert Burns' "Parcel of Rogues", "Tibbie Dunbar", Hamish Henderson's "Freedom Come-All-Ye", and Thurso Berwick's "Scottish Breakaway".

The Ballybough Bridge in the north inner city of Dublin was renamed the Luke Kelly Bridge, and in November 2004 Dublin City Council voted unanimously to erect a bronze statue of Kelly. However, the Dublin Docklands Authority subsequently stated that it could no longer afford to fund the statue. In 2010, councillor Christy Burke of Dublin City Council appealed to members of the music community including Bono, Phil Coulter and Enya to help build it.

Paddy Reilly recorded a tribute to Kelly entitled "The Dublin Minstrel". It featured on his Gold And Silver Years, Celtic Collections and the Essential Paddy Reilly CDs. The Dubliners recorded the song on their Live at Vicar Street DVD/CD. The song was composed by Declan O'Donoghue, the Racing Correspondent of The Irish Sun.

At Christmas 2005, writer-director Michael Feeney Callan's documentary, Luke Kelly: The Performer, was released and soon acquired platinum sales status. The documentary told Kelly's story through the words of the Dubliners, Donovan, Ralph McTell and others and featured full versions of rarely seen performances such as the early sixties' Ed Sullivan Show. A later documentary, Luke Kelly: Prince of the City, was also well received.

In September 1988, a monument was erected to commemorate Kelly in the Larkhill area of Whitehall, where he had lived.

Two statues of Kelly were unveiled in Dublin in January 2019 to mark the 35th anniversary of his death. One, a life-size seated bronze by John Coll, is on South King Street. The second sculpture, a marble portrait head by Vera Klute, is on Sheriff Street. The Klute sculpture was vandalised on several occasions in 2019 and 2020 and was restored each time by graffiti-removal specialists.

== Discography ==
=== Compilation albums ===
| Year | Album details | Irish Album Chart |
|---|---|---|
| 1994 | The Collection: Label: Formats: CD | 1 |
| 1999 | Working Class Hero: Label: Formats: CD | 10 |
| 2004 | The Best Of: Label: Formats: CD | 2 |
| 2005 | The Performer: Label: Formats: CD | 14 |
| 2007 | Working Class Hero: Label: Formats: CD | 33 |
| 2010 | The Definitive Collection: Label: Formats: CD | 7 |

=== Singles ===
| Year | Single details | Irish Singles Chart |
|---|---|---|
| 2013 | The Auld Triangle with The Dubliners: Label: Formats: Digital | 80 |

=== DVDs ===
| Year | Album details | Irish DVD Chart |
|---|---|---|
| 2005 | The Performer: Label: Formats: DVD | 1 |

== Bibliography ==
- Luke Kelly: a Memoir, Des Geraghty, ISBN 1-85594-090-6
- Ar Bhruacha na Life, Des Geraghty, – 23-5-07 135585 www.tg4.ie – En sub.wmv (Déanann Des Geraghty, fear amhrán agus feadóige, ceiliúradh ar an lucht ceoil i mBaile Átha Cliath).
