= John Sheahan =

Irish musician & composer (born 1939)

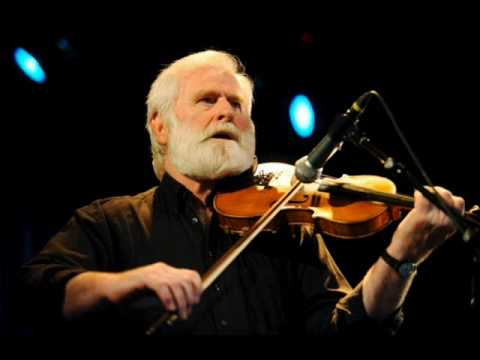
- Sheahan on stage, c. 2011

Background information
- Born: 19 May 1939 (age 87); Dublin, Ireland
- Genre: Irish folk
- Occupation: Musician
- Instruments: Violin; tin whistle; guitar; concertina; mandolin; vocals
- Formerly of: The Dubliners
- Website: johnsheahan.ie

John Sheahan (born 19 May 1939) is an Irish musician and composer. He joined The Dubliners in 1964 and played with them until 2012 when The Dubliners' name was retired following the death of founding member Barney McKenna. Sheahan is the last surviving member of the definitive lineup of the Dubliners.

== Early years and musical apprenticeship ==
John Sheahan was born in Dublin on 19 May 1939. His father, a native of Glin, County Limerick, was a member of the Garda Síochána (the Irish Police Force) stationed in Dublin. He is the great-nephew of Patrick Sheahan, a Dublin Metropolitan Policeman, who in 1905 died trying to save the life of a pipe workman who was overcome by toxic exhalations in a sewer on Hawkins Street, Dublin, where a memorial statue stands today.

Sheahan went to school at the local Christian Brothers in Marino, Dublin, where he received his first musical education, learning the tin whistle. This experience was shared with Paddy Moloney, who later founded The Chieftains, and Leon and Liam Rowsome, sons of the piper Leo Rowsome. When he was about twelve years old he began to take an active interest in music and soon he was to transfer the musical knowledge gained on the whistle to a fiddle he found lying around at home. Enthusiastically supported and encouraged by his parents, he attended the Municipal School of Music (now known as the Dublin Institute of Technology) where he studied classical violin for more than five years.

During this time he continued to maintain his interest in Irish traditional music, which sometimes led him to improvise on the classics by putting in a few embellishments. His tutor would not approve his "composing"; however, Sheahan continued to apply the classical technique to his traditional playing which would ultimately lead to the development of his unique style, gaining him a number of awards at various feiseanna (festivals of Irish traditional music, dancing, poetry and literature). His interest in American bluegrass fiddle music also influenced his style, as can be heard in tunes like "Flop Eared Mule" (also called "Donkey Reel"), recorded with The Dubliners in 1968, 1969 and 1983.

== Career with The Dubliners ==
Sheahan played with a number of bands around the country until he met The Dubliners in the early 1960s. At that time, the group consisted of Ronnie Drew, Barney McKenna, Ciarán Bourke, and Luke Kelly. He joined the band in 1964, together with Bobby Lynch. Both musicians had been playing during the interval at concerts and usually stayed on stage for the second half of the show. When Luke Kelly moved to England in 1964, Lynch was taken on as his temporary replacement; when Kelly returned in 1965, Lynch left the band and Sheahan stayed. He is the only member of the Dubliners to have had a formal musical education.

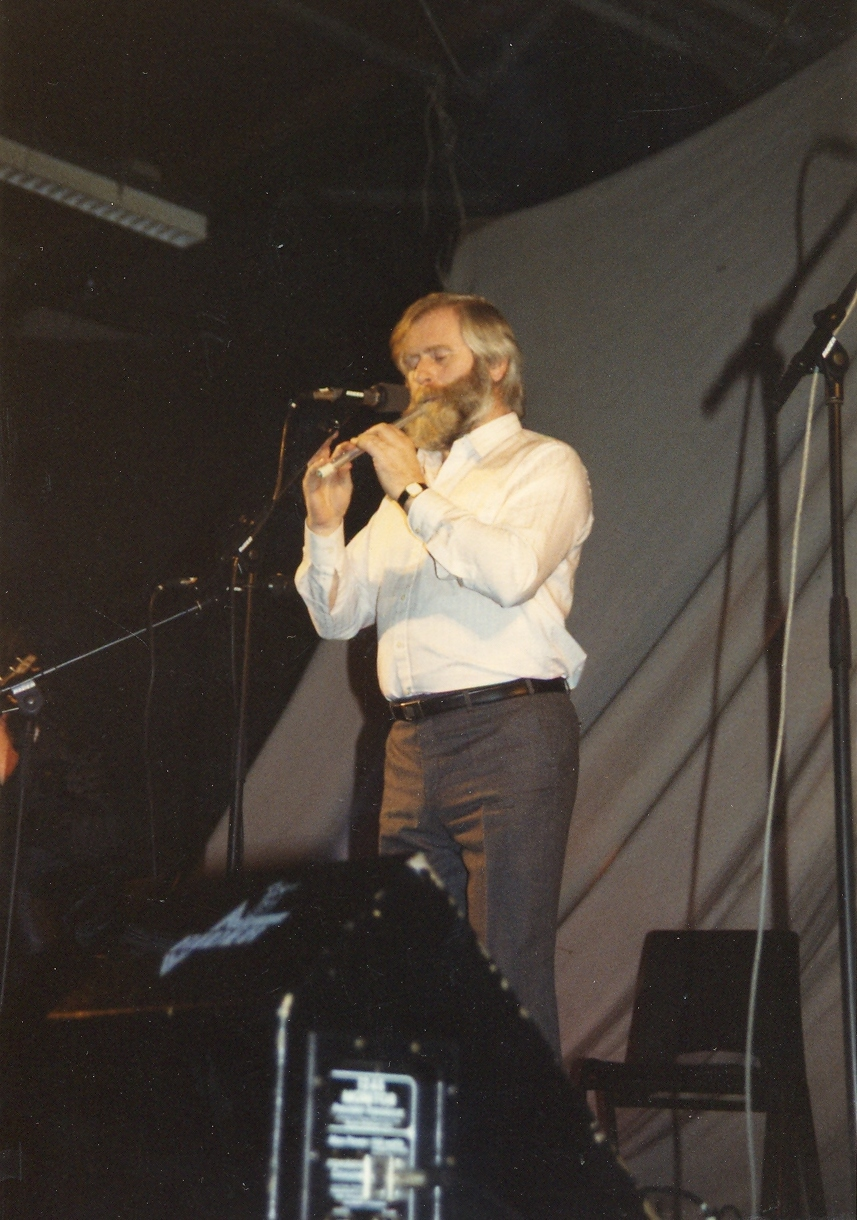
John Sheahan Dubliners Tour

After 50 years of playing and after the death of founding member Barney McKenna, in the autumn of 2012, Sheahan announced the retirement of The Dubliners by the end of the 50th-anniversary tour. The last formation of the band featured Sheahan himself, Sean Cannon, Eamonn Campbell, Patsy Watchorn and Gerry O'Connor.

== After The Dubliners ==
In 2013 Sheahan went on tour with Jane and Shane in Denmark playing classical music and some famous Irish jigs such as The Irish Washerwoman. He also joined in some informal sessions in pubs in Dublin featuring other Irish musicians and Luke Kelly's brother Jim Kelly. In April 2013 he had his own documentary on RTÉ about his life and career with The Dubliners the programme being titled John Sheahan – A Dubliner. In May, he went into Dundalk Primary School to talk about his career with The Dubliners. In October 2013, Sheahan was on The Late Late Show on RTÉ with Paddy Moloney of The Chieftains and performed a jig together on the tin whistle. He has also said that the is developing a book containing his poetry. He played at Templebar Tradfest in Dublin City Hall in January 2014.

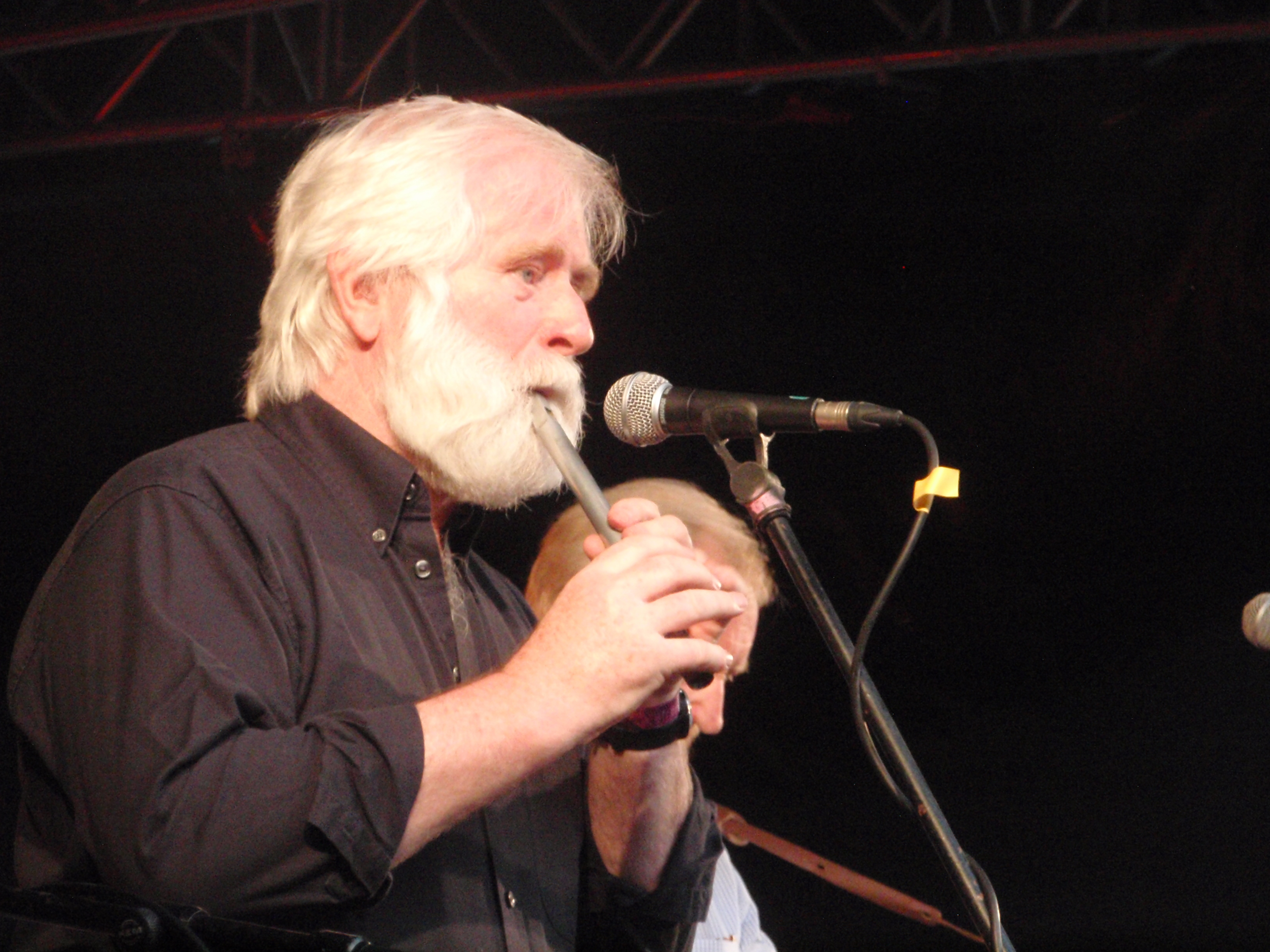

In April 2014, Sheahan was awarded two Irish Film and Television Awards for the television documentary John Sheahan – A Dubliner. On 10 April 2014 Sheahan was part of Ceiliúradh at which he and other Irish musicians performed at the Royal Albert Hall for the Irish presidential visit to the UK. He sang a verse of "The Auld Triangle" and played the fiddle to accompany other musicians. In June 2014 he performed at a special fundraising concert in Dublin raising money in aid of cystic fibrosis. In September 2014, he performed with the RTÉ Concert Orchestra conducted by Gearoid Grant, live in Meeting House Square for Culture Night 2014.

In 2020, at the age of 80 Sheahan released his first solo album, which contains a collection of unrecorded compositions he had written over the past 50 years.

On September 13, 2024, Sheahan and Phil Coulter announced a new live stage show on The Late Late Show. The show, entitled The Dubliners Encore, was to be produced by Coulter, and was planned to tour Europe in 2025.

In December 2024, Sheahan suffered a stroke which has since limited his mobility and ability to speak.

== Other contributions ==
Composing his own music has been one of Sheahan's interests for many years. This led in the 1980s to a big chart hit with "The Marino Waltz" charting at No.4 in Ireland. The tune was subsequently covered by a number of other artists and was followed by the release of an album of original instrumental pieces, written and recorded together with classical guitarist Michael Howard. The album, entitled "In Our Own Time", was released in 1987. Another album, entirely of Sheahan's compositions, was released in 2008 with the title "The Marino Suite" and features the Young European Strings Chamber Orchestra as a supporting ensemble to his fiddle playing.

Sheahan contributed as a guest to several albums. Artists and groups with whom he has worked include:

- Mary Black
- Kate Bush
- Sinéad O'Connor
- U2
- The Pogues
- Shane MacGowan
- Ronan Keating
- Fil Campbell
- Cherish the Ladies
- Liam Clancy
- Danú
- Ronnie Drew
- Danny Doyle
- Dublin City Ramblers
- Damien Dempsey
- Declan O'Rourke
- Foster & Allen
- Finbar Furey
- The Fureys
- Andy Irvine
- Jim McCann
- Daniel O'Donnell
- Paddy Reilly
- Ralph McTell
- André Rieu
- Ancora (2013 Debut album: 'Vrij als de Wind' doing the fiddles on some songs incl. Molly Malone (Kokkels en Mossels), Whiskey in the Jar) and Mannen taan het zeil
- Terence Trent D'Arby
- Patsy Watchorn
- Whipping Boy
- Glen Hansard
