= Ciarán Bourke =

Irish musician (1935–1988)

Background information
- Born: 18 February 1935; Dublin, Ireland
- Died: 10 May 1988 (aged 53) Dublin, Ireland
- Genres: Irish folk
- Occupations: Singer; guitarist
- Years active: 1962–1974; 1987
- Formerly of: The Dubliners

Ciarán Bourke (18 February 1935 – 10 May 1988) was an Irish musician and one of the original founding members of the Irish folk band The Dubliners.

== Early life ==
Ciarán Bourke was born in Dublin on 18 February 1935, but lived most of his life in Tibradden, County Dublin. His father, a doctor, was in practice in the city. The children had an Irish-speaking nanny. Ciarán's early exposure to Irish continued throughout his education, attending Colaiste Mhuire, Parnell Square, Dublin. He later attended University College Dublin for a course in Agricultural Science. He did not take his degree but always retained an interest in farming.

== The Dubliners ==
After leaving university he met two of his future bandmates in The Dubliners, Ronnie Drew and Barney McKenna, who invited Ciarán to join their sessions in O'Donoghue's Pub where he played tin whistle, mouth organ and guitar, as well as singing. Luke Kelly, who had been singing around the clubs in England, returned to Dublin and joined them; the four gained local popularity. Taking the name The Dubliners, the group put together the first folk concert of its kind in Dublin. The concert was a success, then a theatrical production called "A Ballad Tour of Ireland" was put on at the Gate Theatre shortly afterwards.

In 1964 fiddle player John Sheahan joined the band, and this became known as the original Dubliners line-up.

Ciarán was responsible for bringing a Gaelic element to The Dubliners' music with songs such as "Peggy Lettermore" and "Sé Fáth Mo Bhuartha" being performed in the Irish language. He also sang a number of the group's more lighthearted and humorous numbers such as "Jar of Porter", "The Dublin Fusiliers", "The Limerick Rake", "Mrs. McGrath", "Darby O'Leary", "All For Me Grog" and "The Ballad of Ronnie's Mare", as well as patriotic songs such as "Roddy McCorley", "The Enniskillen Dragoons", "Take It Down From The Mast" and "Henry Joy".

== Declining health and death ==
On 5 April 1974, The Dubliners travelled to Eastbourne where they were to appear in concert. Luke was worried by the way Ciarán kept moving his head about, as if trying to alleviate increasing pain. Four minutes into the second half, it was decided he could not continue with the show. Luke insisted that a doctor should be phoned and instructed to await their return to the Irish Club at Eaton Square. The roadie for the trip, John Corry, thought that it was better to drive straight to St George's Hospital in London, where the doctors diagnosed a brain aneurysm. Ciarán was transferred to the Atkinson Morley Hospital in Wimbledon, while doctors waited for his wife to return from a trip to Ghana, to get her signature before operating. She was told that there was danger of further haemorrhaging. Ciarán was operated on at the earliest opportunity. The bleeding began again while he was on the table which meant that they could not repair the damage, just staunch the bleeding. This left him paralysed down his left side and confused as to where he was and what had happened.

Ciarán received intensive therapy, attending a clinic in Dún Laoghaire, County Dublin. He was heartened by his progress and insisted on rejoining the Dubliners on their next tour of the Continent in November that year.

Ciarán's continued insistence that he was fit enough to join them on the forthcoming German tour caused them considerable disquiet. They preferred he ease himself back to work, with a few small shows in Ireland. The tour gradually began to take its toll on Ciarán, and it was decided that for the sake of his health he should return home. He flew from Brussels to Dublin.

Ciarán made his last public appearance on Ireland's RTÉ One during The Late Late Show's tribute to The Dubliners in 1987. Despite his lingering paralysis he recited "The Lament for Brendan Behan" after which everyone in the studio, led by Ronnie Drew, sang "The Auld Triangle".

Ciarán Bourke died on 10 May 1988 after a long illness. From 1974 until his death he had continued to be paid by the band. A fifth member of the group was not recruited until after his death.

== Personal life ==
Ciarán married Jeannie Bonham on 5 April 1964. Together they had six daughters: Ciara, Laoighse, Síobhra (R.I.P.), Rathfíonna, Saoirse and Seodhna, and nine grandchildren Benn, Ceoladh, Jack, Clara, Aoibh, Cairo, Ríona, Phoenix and Daire.
