= Major Minor Records =

1960s British record label

- Founded: August 1966
- Founder: Phil Solomon
- Defunct: March 15, 1971
- Status: Defunct
- Distributor: Selecta
- Genre: Various
- Country of origin: UK
- Location: London, England

Major Minor Records was a British record label started by Phil Solomon in 1966. In the early summer of 1966, he had courted a number of British independent labels for a label tentatively named Caroline, after the pirate radio station he owned, which was named Radio Caroline. It adopted the Major Minor name within two months. During the fall, it secured a distribution deal with Decca Records' Selecta division, as well as a pressing deal with CBS, and issued its first single, a recording from Ireland's O'Brien Brothers.

In August 1967, the Wilson government outlawed pirate radio and, although Radio Caroline continued, it began to heavily promote records from the Major Minor label, which had benefitted from the playing of its records on the station, causing him to intensify its operations in the months before the prime minister's outlawing of pirate radio. Caroline's DJs were unhappy with the type of music they were being forced to play and it is doubtful that much of the revenue from the record label actually went back into the radio station. In March 1968, the two Caroline ships were silenced when they were seized by creditors.

In April 1967, Major Minor scored the UK rights to recordings issued by Roulette Records in the US; although products were intended to be issued on that label, they instead appeared on Major Minor with a Roulette credit until September 1968. In the interim between that time, it achieved a #1 hit with Tommy James and the Shondells' single "Mony Mony". Also in 1968, it picked up the rights to a label named JAD, which, as with Roulette, had its releases issued on Major Minor with a credit to the licensor. The French Barclay label also licensed material from its Riviera subsidiary to Major Minor, with a contract signed in the same month that it signed one with Roulette.

Major Minor's big chart moment came in 1969, when the label picked up a 'dropped' record and took it to Number 1 in the UK Singles Chart. The track, "Je t'aime... moi non plus" by Jane Birkin and Serge Gainsbourg, was originally released on Fontana. Despite being performed in French, the song's obvious sexual tone resulted in a wide-scale ban from mainstream radio stations, and Fontana deleted the single during its chart ascent, allegedly because the wife of Fontana's boss was appalled at her husband's company releasing such a song. Major Minor acquired the licensing rights, and got its best selling single on the back of the controversy. Charles Aznavour is another French artist who worked with Major Minor (a single, "To My Daughter" / "Yesterday When I Was Young", and an LP, Aznavour Sings Aznavour).

Soul and jazz musicians on the label included Johnny Nash, Dizzy Gillespie, Sam and Dave, the Isley Brothers, Kim Weston and Cissy Houston. Rock artists included July and Them (who were managed by Solomon). There was also an obscure pre-10cc single featuring Eric Stewart credited to the New Wave Band ("Cecilia" / "Free, Free, Free"). Rory Gallagher's band Taste also released a single on the label ("Blister on the Moon" / "Born on the Wrong Side of Time").

A young Peter Sarstedt cut his first single, "My Monkey is a Junkie", for the label, under the name Peter Lincoln. The other big success was Northern Ireland's David McWilliams with "Days of Pearly Spencer", leased from EMI. Other tunes that Caroline had to play included "Sentimental Songs" by Freddie "Parrotface" Davies. The label also scored hits with pianist Neville Dickie, balladeers Karen Young and Malcolm Roberts, and bubblegum band Crazy Elephant.

In 1970, rumours sparked about plans by Decca or EMI to purchase the Major Minor label, but both Solomon and a company spokesman denied them. In September 1970, however, EMI acquired the rights to the Major Minor catalogue and licensing contracts. On 8 February 1971, a series of creditors, including Decca, Radio Luxembourg and the Mechanical Copyright Protection Society proposed that Major Minor's assets be liquidated. The company ceased operations on 15 March 1971.

In July 2010, EMI announced that the label would be resurrected to release an "expanded 20th anniversary" release of Morrissey's Bona Drag.

== Subsidiaries ==
One subsidiary of the label was the Toast Record label. This short-lived label which released soul records was established in early 1968. In December, 1969 the address for the label was 58/59 Gt. Marlborough Street, London W. 1. with Vicky Wickham listed as the contact.

Artists to have their recordings released on the label included Steve & Stevie of the group Tin Tin, Doris Troy with "I'll Do Anything", and Joe E. Young & The Toniks with "Good Day Sunshine".

Joy Marshall who had a Top 40 hit in 1966 in the UK with "The More I See You", recorded the single, "And I'll Find You" bw "I'm So Glad You're Back: which was released on Toast TT 512. Marshall, who was married to Peter King accidentally overdosed on sleeping tablets and alcohol in December 1968. Peter Jones, possibly unaware of Marshall's death in 1968, reviewed the Toast single in the 4 January, 1969 issue of Record Mirror. It got a four-star rating. He enjoyed listening to it and said it was a very good performance as expected, but the song might not be quite direct enough to click.

The group 67 Park Lane along with The Coins were acts that Vicki Wickham produced. 67 Park Lane recorded the single, " I'm So Happy Just to Be with You" bw "I Got Love". It was reviewed by Peter Jones in the 22 March, 1969 issue of Record Mirror. Jones said the song worked well enough, but it didn't have many direct chances. They were at booked to appear at the Golden Star Club on Westbourne Road on 27 September 1969 and at the Pheasantry in Chelsea on 1st June 1970. 67 Park Lane was allegedly the group that had the last release on the label.

According to Philip Palmer in the "From The Music Capitals of the World" section in the 29 March 1969 issue of Billboard, Major Minor were dropping the Toast label. The sole producer for the label, Vicki Wickham was also leaving the company and would produce on an independent basis.

The company made unsuccessful plans to launch labels catering to country music and progressive rock. In July 1970, it announced the launch, in August, of a label in the latter genre that was to feature recordings from the Irish label Dolphin; the label was unable to follow through on this announcement.
