= Seven Drunken Nights =

- Side A of the UK single

Single by The Dubliners

from the album A Drop of the Hard Stuff
- B-side: "Paddy on the Railway"
- Released: 30 March 1967
- Genre: Folk, Irish, pop
- Length: 3:45
- Label: Major Minor
- Songwriter: Traditional
- Producer: Tommy Scott

The Dubliners singles chronology
| "Nelson's Farewell" (1966) | "Seven Drunken Nights" (1967) | "Black Velvet Band" (1967) |

"Seven Drunken Nights" is a humorous Irish folk song most famously performed by The Dubliners. It is a variation of the English/Scottish folk song "Our Goodman" (Child 274, Roud 114). It tells the story of a gullible drunkard returning night after night to see new evidence of his wife's lover, only to be taken in by increasingly implausible explanations.

== History ==
"Our Goodman" was collected in Scotland in the 1770s. Another version was found in a London broadside of the 1760s entitled "The Merry Cuckold and the Kind Wife". The broadside was translated into German, and spread into Hungary and Scandinavia. Unusually for such a popular and widespread song, it appears in only a few nineteenth century broadsides.

In the version known as "Seven Nights Drunk", each night is a verse, followed by a chorus, in which the narrator comes home in a drunken state to find evidence of another man having been with his wife, which she explains away, not entirely convincingly. The song also became part of American folk culture, both through Irish-Americans and through the blues tradition.

The song passed from oral tradition to a global mass market with The Dubliners recording of "Seven Drunken Nights". The record reached number 7 in the UK charts in 1967 and appeared on Top of the Pops, thanks to its diffusion on Radio Caroline. Although it was banned from the Irish national broadcasting station, the song also charted at No.1 in Ireland.

A music video for the song was shot in late 1967 in the Anglers Rest Pub in the Strawberry Beds.

=== Charts ===
| Chart (1967) | Peak position |
|---|---|
| Ireland (IRMA) | 1 |
| UK Singles (OCC) | 7 |

== Lyrics and variations ==
Different versions of the lyrics exist right from the start of the song though variation increases for the last two nights.

There are also vernacular versions of the song among Irish-Americans, with at least one version referred to as "Uncle Mike."

In that version, the wife's reply to the drunkard (Uncle Mike) is: Oh you darn fool, you damn fool, you son-of-a-bitch said she, It only is a milk cow my mother sent to me.

The drunkard's reply to his wife is more similar to the "official" version recorded by The Dubliners and other Irish folk singing groups: Well, there's many times I've travelled, a hundred miles or more, But a saddle on a cow, sure; I've never see before.

Variations such as "Uncle Mike" are common in oral, local cultures. Note how in America the pig became a milk cow, and the distance travelled by the drunkard expands considerably. "Four Nights Drunk" and "Five Nights Drunk" are just two of the many versions of this song (Cray 1999).

=== Nights 1–5 ===
On the first night (generally Monday), the narrator sees a strange horse outside the door:

As I went home on Monday night as drunk as drunk could be,
I saw a horse outside the door where my old horse should be.
Well, I called me wife and I said to her: "Will you kindly tell to me
Who owns that horse outside the door where my old horse should be?"

His wife tells him it is merely a sow, a gift from her mother:

"Ah, you're drunk, you're drunk, you silly old fool, still you can not see
That's a lovely sow that me mother sent to me."

In each verse the narrator notices a flaw in each explanation, but seems content to let the matter rest:

Well, it's many a day I've travelled a hundred miles or more,
But a saddle on a sow sure I never saw before.

The next four nights involve a coat (actually a blanket according to the wife, upon which he notices buttons), a pipe (a tin whistle, filled with tobacco), two boots (flower pots, with laces), and finally, this being the last verse often sung, a head peering out from beneath the covers. Again his wife tells him it is a baby boy, leading to the retort "a baby boy with his whiskers on sure I never saw before." Each new item appearing in the house is said to be a gift from the wife's mother.

=== Nights 6–7 ===
The final two verses are often not sung, and are generally considered too raunchy; different versions are cited below. Verse six sometimes keeps the same story line, in which two hands appear on the wife's breasts. The wife, giving the least likely explanation yet, tells him that it is merely a nightgown, though the man notices that this nightgown has fingers. In yet another version, the wife remarks that he has seen a hammer in her bed, and his response is that a hammer with a condom on is something he has never seen before. This latter version usually ends day seven with the singer's target of choice in bed, and the husband replies that he's never seen so-and-so with a hard on before. Another version involves a carrot, on which a foreskin (or two onions) had never been seen before. Live versions of Sunday night include the following verse. As I went home on Sunday night as drunk as drunk could be. I saw me wife inside the bed and this she said to me: Then, the song wraps up with a part from "Never on a Sunday."

Another version exists with a slight twist. The man sees a man coming out the door at a little after 3:00, this time the wife saying it was an English tax collector that the Queen sent. (or the king of England) The narrator, now wise to what is going on, remarks: "Well, it's many a day I've travelled a hundred miles or more, but an Englishman who can last till three, I've never seen before." While this departs noticeably from the standard cycle, the twist is slightly more clever, and takes a jab at the English (a popular ploy in some Irish songs). As this sort of wraps up the story, it is usually sung as the last verse, be it the sixth or seventh.

Probably the most common version of the seventh verse involves the man seeing a "thing" in her "thing", or in "the bed", where his "thing" should be. Again his wife is ready with an answer. It is a rolling pin. The narrator then remarks, "A rolling pin made out of skin, I never saw before." Another version reuses the tin whistle excuse, upon which the narrator remarks "...hair on a tin whistle sure I never saw before." Other versions claim the "thing" involved is a candle (in which case she does not recycle an excuse from an earlier night). The narrator this time remarks that he had never before seen a pair of balls on a candle.

One version of the final verse, noted in 1965, runs "I came home on Saturday, carrying my twelve-bore; I never saw two buggers run so [………] fast before." If sung, the stress on the syllables of "twelve-bore" is reversed to fit the rhythm of the tune, and the obscenity, or otherwise, of the two-syllable adjective describing the culprits's speed varies according to taste.

== Bibliography ==
- Cray, Ed (1999). The Erotic Muse: AMERICAN BAWDY SONGS (Music in American Life). University of Illinois Press. pp. 11–21, 330.
- Smyth, G (1994). "Ireland unplugged: the roots of Irish folk/trad. (Con)Fusion." Irish Studies Review 12 (1): 87–97.
