= Ronnie Drew =

Irish singer & musician (1934–2008)

- Ronnie Drew in 2006

Background information
- Born: Joseph Ronald Drew; 16 September 1934; Glasthule, Dún Laoghaire, County Dublin, Ireland
- Died: 16 August 2008 (aged 73) Dublin, Ireland
- Genres: Irish folk
- Occupations: Singer; songwriter; guitarist; actor
- Instruments: Vocals; guitar
- Years active: 1956–2008
- Labels: Dolphin Records; Sony; Columbia
- Formerly of: The Dubliners

Joseph Ronald Drew (16 September 1934 – 16 August 2008) was an Irish singer, folk musician and actor who had a fifty-year career recording with The Dubliners.

He sang lead vocals on the singles "Seven Drunken Nights" and "The Irish Rover", which both charted in the UK top 10 and were performed on Top of the Pops. His voice was once described by Nathan Joseph as being "like the sound of coke (coal) being crushed under a door".

== Early life ==
O'Donoghue's

"Ronnie Drew in his fine suit of blue
And a voice like gravel that would cut you in two
We thought he was Dublin through and through
But he blew in from Dún Laoghaire"

— ~ Andy Irvine, 2004

Ronnie Drew was born in Dún Laoghaire, County Dublin in 1934. Although he was so intimately associated with being "a Dubliner", he would sometimes say, "I was born and grew up in Dún Laoghaire, and no true Dubliner would accept that at all!", a quip that Andy Irvine relayed in his song "O'Donoghue's".

Drew was educated at CBS Eblana and used to "mitch" and cycle up to Leopardstown Racecourse.

Drew was a Roman Catholic, and when asked in an interview with RTÉ about his faith, he stated that although he was a practicing Catholic, he didn't agree with the church establishment and its greed.

Drew had also sung as a boy soprano before his voice broke.

== Career ==
In the 1950s, Drew moved to Spain to teach English and learn Spanish and flamenco guitar. His interest in folk music began at the age of 19. When he returned to Ireland, he performed in the Gate Theatre with John Molloy and soon went into the music business full-time, after holding a number of short-term jobs—including one at Dublin's telephone exchange.

In 1962, he founded the Ronnie Drew Group with Luke Kelly, Barney McKenna and Ciarán Bourke. They soon changed their name to The Dubliners—with John Sheahan joining shortly afterwards to form the definitive line-up—and quickly became one of the best known Irish folk groups. They played at first in O'Donoghue's Pub in Merrion Row, Dublin 2 where they were often accompanied by Mary Jordan on the spoons and vocalist Ann Mulqueen, a friend of McKenna's. Mary Jordan's mother, Peggy Jordan, introduced them to the Abbey Tavern in Howth, which became a regular Monday night venue for the emerging group. They also played across the road in the Royal Hotel, at all-night parties in Peggy's large house in Kenilworth Square in Rathgar, and in John Molloy's flat at Ely Place.

Drew left the Dubliners in 1974. He rejoined in 1979, but then left for good in 1995, though he did reunite with the group in 2002 for a 40th anniversary celebration. He made several television appearances with the group between 2002 and 2005.

From 1995 onwards, Drew pursued a solo career. He recorded with many artists, including Christy Moore, The Pogues, Antonio Breschi, Dropkick Murphys, Eleanor Shanley and others. He did a number of "one-man shows"—he was accompanied by various guitarists—during this period, such as Songs and Stories, Ronnie, I Hardly Knew Ya and Ronnie. These shows consisted of stories about people such as Brendan Behan, Patrick Kavanagh and Seán O'Casey, as well as Drew singing their songs.

He fronted a campaign to encourage the use of Dublin's light-rail infrastructure (the DART) and, before that, the "My Dublin" ads for radio stations 98FM and FM104. He narrated a retelling of the great Irish Myths and Legends—scripted by Steven Byrne—over a six CD set in 2006. He also narrated the stories of Oscar Wilde in his distinctive voice for a series released on CD by the News of the World newspaper. Both were re-released as CD box sets in 2010.

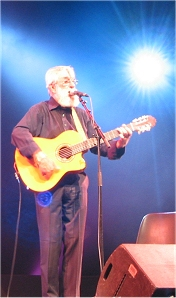
Ronnie Drew in 2004

On 22 August 2006, Drew was honoured in a ceremony where his hand prints were added to the "Walk of Fame" outside Dublin's Gaiety Theatre.

== Declining health and death ==
In September 2006, Drew was reported to be in ill health after being admitted to St. Vincent's Hospital, Dublin, to undergo tests for suspected cancer. The Evening Herald reported that his apparent illness was due to years of heavy drinking. However, according to a fan site dedicated to The Dubliners, it was reported that he was undergoing treatment for throat cancer. Drew had been a teetotaler for a number of years, with an occasional relapse, but he remained a regular smoker.

He appeared on Ireland's The Late Late Show on 15 December 2006 along with Phil Coulter, where he discussed his recent health scares.

Despite his failing health, he was featured on an album entitled Pearls—produced by Niall Austin—with work he did with Jah Wobble.

His wife of more than 40 years, Deirdre Drew (née McCartan, daughter of Patrick McCartan), died on 7 June 2007 at St Vincent's Hospital, just one day before he was scheduled to return to performing live at the Legends of Irish Folk concert, which also featured Johnny McEvoy, Ralph McTell and Finbar Furey.

On 25 October 2007, Drew—now bald and beardless—appeared on Ryan Confidential on RTÉ 1 to give an interview about his role in The Dubliners, his life since leaving the band and being diagnosed with throat cancer. Later in 2007, he again appeared on The Late Late Show, where he spoke some more about the death of his wife and his ongoing treatment for cancer.

Drew died in St. Vincent's Hospital, Dublin, on 16 August 2008, following his long illness. He was buried three days later in Redford Cemetery in Greystones.

== Tributes ==
=== "The Ballad of Ronnie Drew" ===
On 19 February 2008, a song was released called "The Ballad of Ronnie Drew" performed by a number of famous Irish musicians or musicians living in Ireland. This included members of The Dubliners, U2, Sinéad O'Connor, Christy Dignam of Aslan, Robert Hunter of the Grateful Dead, Kíla, Christy Moore, Andrea Corr, Moya Brennan, Shane MacGowan, Liam Ó Maonlaí, Bob Geldof, Damien Dempsey, Gavin Friday, Iona Green, Jerry Fish, Paul Brady, Paddy Casey, Mick Pyro, Mundy, Chris de Burgh, Ronan Keating, Jack L, Eleanor Shanley, Mary Black, Declan O'Rourke, Mary Coughlan, and Joe Elliott of Def Leppard and The Chieftains.

Originally, the song had been written to include Drew himself but was changed into a tribute to him as his health was declining. Proceeds from sale of the single went to the Irish Cancer Society, at Drew's request. The song was also performed live on The Late Late Show on 22 February with Drew in attendance as an audience member, and entered the Irish Singles Charts at No. 2.

=== September Song ===
Also in 2008, RTÉ broadcast a documentary on Drew in May – as part of its Arts Lives series. Called September Song, it featured Drew's recollections of growing up in his grandmother's house in Dún Laoghaire, the foundation of The Dubliners in O'Donoghue's pub on Merrion Row, the days spent touring the world, the loss of his wife, and his own battle with cancer. Interviewed in September Song are his son Phelim, his daughter Cliodhna, plus friends and fans such as Bono, Billy Connolly and Damien Dempsey.

September Song was produced by Oscar-nominated producer Noel Pearson and directed by Sinead O'Brien. The name of the documentary comes from Drew's recording of "September Song"—the Kurt Weill and Maxwell Anderson song made popular through recordings by a number of artists, including Frank Sinatra—which features on his 2006 solo album, There's Life in the Old Dog Yet.

=== Other tributes ===
Andy Irvine mentioned Drew in the song "O'Donoghue's" he recorded with his band Mozaik on the album Changing Trains, and again on the live album Andy Irvine/70th Birthday Concert at Vicar St 2012.

The Tossers, a Chicago-based celtic punk band, dedicated their album On a Fine Spring Evening to his memory. Their song "St. Stephen's Day" includes the line "I could go on up to Wicklow and throw a rose on Ronnie's grave".

Flogging Molly lead singer David King listed Drew as one of the greatest losses of a musician, in recent years, calling him "A REAL folk singer." at a show in Moscow, Idaho.

Gaelic Storm named Drew on the song "I Was Raised on Black and Tans" from their 2010 album Cabbage. "I was raised on black and tans...on Ronnie Drew and Van the Man" is a line from the song.

Dropkick Murphys, a Celtic punk band from Boston, Massachusetts, dedicated the song "(F)lannigan's Ball" to Drew during their set at the Reading Festival in 2008. The Pogues' Spider Stacy joined the band for this song. Stacy and Drew were featured as guest vocalists on the studio recording of the song, one of the last Drew recorded before his death.

Australian-Irish folk punk band The Rumjacks from Australia name-checks Drew in their hit song "An Irish Pub Song" about the ailing quality of some Irish pubs. "It's over to me, and over to you! We'll skip along the avenue, and who the hell is Ronnie Drew? We got us an Irish pub!"

== The Last Session: A Fond Farewell ==
In the final months before his death, Drew recorded a number of songs in a traditional jazz style. A number of stars from the music world, including Mary Coughlan and Damien Dempsey, joined him in duets on the album. It was produced by Hugh Buckley and released in November 2008 by Celtic Collections.

== Legacy ==
Mary McAleese, then President of Ireland, said Drew had brought great pleasure to people at home and abroad and had re-energised and refreshened Ireland's unique musical heritage; Taoiseach Brian Cowen also described him as "iconic".

== Solo discography ==
- Ronnie Drew (1975) Ireland No. 7
- Guaranteed (1978)
- Dirty Rotten Shame (1995) Ireland No. 1
- The Humour Is on Me Now (1999)
- A Couple More Years (with Eleanor Shanley) (2000) Ireland No. 47
- An Evening With Ronnie Drew (2004)
- The Magic of Christmas (2004) (Guest Appearance)
- El Amor De Mi Vida (with Eleanor Shanley) (2006)
- A New World (2006)
- There's Life in the Old Dog Yet (2006)
- Pearls (with Grand Canal) (2007)
- The Best of Ronnie Drew (2007)
- The Last Session: A Fond Farewell (2008) Ireland No. 18 Recorded and released on Irish record label Celtic Collections

=== Singles ===
- "Weila Weila" (1975) Ireland No. 15
- "Spanish Lady" (1994) (Feat Dustin, The Saw Doctors) Ireland No. 1
- "Easy and Slow" (2008) Ireland No. 18

== Filmography ==
- Finbar Lebowitz (2000)
