= Dubliners 50 Years Anniversary Tour =

2012 concert tour by the Dubliners

50 Years Tour
- World tour by The Dubliners
- Location: Europe
- Associated album: 50 Years
- Start date: 27 January 2012
- End date: 31 December 2012

The Dubliners concert chronology
- A Time To Remember (2009–11); 50 Years (2012)

The Dubliners 50th Anniversary Tour was a tour in 2012 by the Dubliners celebrating 50 years. The group was awarded a lifetime achievement award by BBC Radio 2 in February. However, in April, founding member and tenor banjo player Barney McKenna died. Banjo player Gerry O'Connor filled his place until the end of the tour. In November the group released the album 50 Years charting in the Irish Top 10. John Sheahan after 48 years decided he could no longer continue with the band due to the death of Barney McKenna. In December the group played its final concerts at Vicar Street and were joined on stage by Jim McCann. The band met with President Michael Higgins in the presidential palace in Dublin. The group appeared on BBC's Jools Holland Annual Hootenanny on New Year's Eve. With the exception of John Sheahan, the rest of the group continues touring as The Dublin Legends – Spirit of the Dubliners.

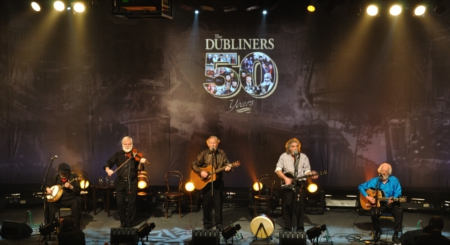
The Dubliners live at Vicar Street 2012

== Setlist ==
1. The Fermoy Lassies / Sporting Paddy
2. Seven Drunken Nights (Archive Video featuring Ronnie Drew)
3. The Rare Auld Mountain Dew
4. The Ferryman
5. Fiddler's Green (Archive Video featuring Barney McKenna)
6. The Belfast Hornpipe / The Swallow's Tail
7. Poem for Luke (Poem, recited by John Sheahan)
8. Kelly the Boy from Killan (Archive Video featuring Luke Kelly)
9. Dirty Old Town
10. The Rare Auld Times
11. When the Boys Come Rolling Home
12. Fáinne Geal an Lae
13. Poem for Barney (Poem, recited by John Sheahan)
14. Banjo Solo
15. Billy in the Lowground / The Moving Cloud
16. The Monto (Archive Video featuring Luke Kelly)
17. All for Me Grog
18. Remembering Ciarán (Poem, recited by John Sheahan)
19. Bainne na mBó (Archive Video featuring Ciarán Bourke)
20. Peggy Lettermore
21. Farewell to Harstad
22. Feathered Gael / Jackie Coleman's Reel
23. I Wish I Had Someone to Love Me (Archive Video featuring Barney McKenna)
24. The Rocky Road to Dublin
25. A Pint of Plain (Archive Video featuring Ronnie Drew)
26. Finnegan's Wake
27. Sketch of a Dubliner (Poem, recited by John Sheahan)
28. McAlpine's Fusiliers (Archive Video featuring Ronnie Drew)
29. Cooley's Reel / The Dawn / The Mullingar Races
30. The Black Velvet Band / Dicey Reilly / The Marino Waltz / The Irish Rover
31. Whiskey in the Jar

Encore:

1. The Wild Rover
2. Molly Malone

== Tour dates ==
Date	City	Country	Venue
27 January 2012	Dublin	Ireland	Christ Church Cathedral, Dublin – Temple Bar TradFest
28 January 2012	Dublin	Ireland	Christ Church Cathedral, Dublin – Temple Bar TradFest
1 February 2012	Bern	Switzerland	Theater National
2 February 2012	Basel	Switzerland	Stadtcasino
3 February 2012	Zurich	Switzerland	Neues Theater Spirgarten
4 February 2012	St. Gallen	Switzerland	Tonhalle
7 March 2012	Cardiff	Wales	St. David's Hall
8 March 2012	Plymouth	England	Plymouth Pavilions
9 March 2012	Cheltenham	England	Town Hall
10 March 2012	Nottingham	England	Royal Concert Hall
11 March 2012	Leicester	England	De Montford Hall
12 March 2012	Norwich	England	Theatre Royal
13 March 2012	London	England	Royal Albert Hall
14 March 2012	Manchester	England	Opera House
15 March 2012	Reading	England	The Hexagon
17 March 2012	Birmingham	England	Town Hall
18 March 2012	Leeds	England	Grand Theatre & Opera House
19 March 2012	Liverpool	England	Philharmonic Hall
18 April 2012	Copenhagen	Denmark	Tivoli, Tivolis Koncertsal
19 April 2012	Ringsted	Denmark	Kongrescenter
20 April 2012	Nykøbing Mors	Denmark	Morsø Arena
21 April 2012	Frederikshavn	Denmark	Arena Nord
22 April 2012	Esbjerg	Denmark	Musikhuset
24 April 2012	Skjern	Denmark	Kulturcenter
25 April 2012	Aalborg	Denmark	Skråen
26 April 2012	Sørvad	Denmark	Kultur & Idrætscenter
27 April 2012	Viborg	Denmark	Tinghallen
28 April 2012	Aarhus	Denmark	Musikhuset
4 May 2012	Ingelmunster	Belgium	Labadoux festival
10 May 2012	Paris	France	La Cigale
2 June 2012	Listowel	Ireland	Kerry
3 June 2012	Cork	Ireland	Opera House
4 June 2012	Limerick	Ireland	UCH
7 June 2012	Belfast	Northern Ireland	Waterfront Hall
8 June 2012	Derry	Northern Ireland	Millennium Forum
9 June 2012	Drogheda	Ireland	TLT Concert Hall & Theatre
23 June 2012	Westport	Ireland	Westport Festival
30 June 2012	Tønsberg	Norway	Oseberg kulturhus – Vestfoldfestspillene
8 July 2012	Skagen	Denmark	Skagen Folk Festival
6 September 2012	Vienna	Austria	Metropol
7 September 2012	Vienna	Austria	Metropol
8 September 2012	Vienna	Austria	Metropol
9 September 2012	Vienna	Austria	Metropol
10 September 2012	Vienna	Austria	Metropol
11 September 2012	Vienna	Austria	Metropol
12 September 2012	Vienna	Austria	Metropol
13 September 2012	Graz	Austria	Orpheum
14 September 2012	Zagreb	Croatia	Tvornica kulture
15 September 2012	Ljubljana	Slovenia	Krisanke
16 September 2012	Oslip	Austria	Cselley Mühle
28 September 2012	Ettelbruck	Luxembourg	Daichhalle
29 September 2012	Turnhout	Belgium	Warande Turnhout
30 September 2012	Brussels	Belgium	Paleis voor Schone Kunsten
1 October 2012	Tilburg	Netherlands	013
3 October 2012	Utrecht	Netherlands	Vredenburg Leidsche Rijn
4 October 2012	Rotterdam	Netherlands	De Doelen
5 October 2012	Rijssen	Netherlands	Lucky & co
6 October 2012	Leeuwarden	Netherlands	World Trade Center
7 October 2012	Amsterdam	Netherlands	Paradiso
1 November 2012	Munich	Germany	Cirkus Krone
2 November 2012	Stuttgart	Germany	Theaterhaus
3 November 2012	Beckingen	Germany	Deutschherrenhalle
4 November 2012	Bamberg	Germany	Bamberger Konzert- und Kongresshalle
5 November 2012	Frankfurt	Germany	Alte Oper
7 November 2012	Hanover	Germany	Theater am Aegi
8 November 2012	Bremen	Germany	Glocke
9 November 2012	Aurich	Germany	Stadthalle
10 November 2012	Bielefeld	Germany	Ringlokschuppen
11 November 2012	Dortmund	Germany	Konzerthaus
2 December 2012	Dresden	Germany	Alter Schlachthof
3 December 2012	Braunschweig	Germany	Stadthalle
4 December 2012	Cloppenburg	Germany	Stadthalle
5 December 2012	Kiel	Germany	Kieler Schloss
6 December 2012	Lübeck	Germany	Musik und Kongresshalle
7 December 2012	Flensburg	Germany	Deutsches Haus
8 December 2012	Hamburg	Germany	CCH
28 December 2012	Dublin	Ireland	Vicar Street
29 December 2012	Dublin	Ireland	Vicar Street
30 December 2012	Dublin	Ireland	Vicar Street
31 December 2012	London	England	BBC Studios – Jools Holland Annual Hootenanny

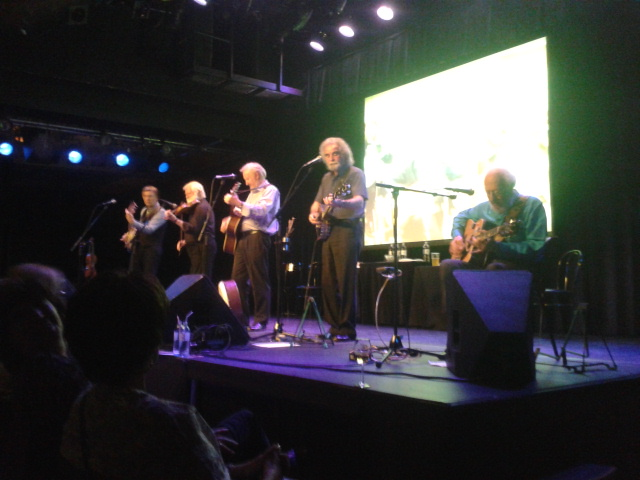
Live in Vienna 2012

== Line up ==
=== The Dubliners ===
- Seán Cannon – Lead Vocals, Guitar
- Patsy Watchorn – Lead Vocals, Banjo
- John Sheahan – Fiddle, Mandolin, Tin Whistle
- Eamonn Campbell – Guitar
- Barney McKenna – Tenor Banjo, Mandolin, Vocals (January–April, died 5 April)

=== Guest Musicians ===
- Gerry O'Connor – Tenor Banjo, fiddle (April–December)
- Christy Sheridan – Tenor Banjo (May)
- Chris Kavanagh – Vocals, banjo (February)
- Jim McCann – Guitar (December)

=== Featured in Archive Videos ===
- Luke Kelly: "Kelly, the Boy from Killan", "The Monto"
- Ronnie Drew: "Seven Drunken Nights", "McAlpines Fusiliers", "A Pint of Plain"
- Ciarán Bourke: "Bainne na mBó"
- Barney McKenna (April–December): "Fiddler's Green", "I Wish I Had Someone to Love Me"
