= The Late Late Tribute Shows =

Series of special editions of The Late Late Show

- Genre: Talk show
- Presented by: Ryan Tubridy
- Country of origin: Ireland
- Original language: English
- No. of episodes: 34 (list of episodes)

Production
- Production locations: Dublin, Ireland

Original release
- Network: RTÉ One
- Release: 13 May 1967 – 5 November 2019

Related
- The Late Late Show

The Late Late Tribute Shows are a series of special editions of the world's second longest-running chat show, The Late Late Show broadcast on RTÉ One in Ireland each Friday evening.

== History ==
Over decades the shows have featured a broad range of well-known public figures including Micheál Mac Liammóir, Joe Dolan, Maureen Potter, Michael O'Hehir, Brian Lenihan, Jimmy Magee, Christy Moore, Mike Murphy and Paul McGrath.

In 1999, there was a special programme marking six months since the Omagh bombing and there was also a special show in the wake of 9/11. There were also tribute shows celebrating Irish music and a Late Late Show special devoted to Irish comedians. Individual bands and musicians to have been given a tribute show include The Clancy Brothers and Tommy Makem, The Chieftains, The Dubliners, U2, Westlife and, most recently, Ronnie Drew himself.

The Tribute Shows, along with the Toy Show, tends to be one of the few editions of The Late Late Show to require advance preparation before the week of broadcast.

== Tribute list ==
Date	Tribute/Special	Guests
13 May 1967	The Clergy	
16 March 1968	The London Irish	Eamonn Andrews
25 October 1969	Micheál Mac Liammóir	Maureen Potter and Hilton Edwards
31 May 1975	Michael O'Hehir	
6 January 1973	Seán Keating	
18 December 1976	Maureen Potter	
21 January 1984	Seán MacBride	
28 April 1984	The Clancy Brothers and Tommy Makem	Ronnie Drew, Barney McKenna, John Sheahan, Seán Cannon and Paddy Reilly
22 September 1984	Gaelic Athletic Association	
1987	The Chieftains	Christy Moore, Donal Lunny, Guo Brothers, Van Morrison, Maire Brennan, Dolores Keana, John Faulkner and Gary Moore
6 March 1987	The Late Late Show Tribute to The Dubliners	Luke Kelly, Ciarán Bourke, Eamonn Campbell, The Fureys & Davey Arthur, Charles Haughey, Jim McCann, Christy Moore, The Pogues, Stockton's Wing and U2
20 January 1989	Jimmy Magee	
30 March 1990	Brian Lenihan	
18 December 1992	Sharon Shannon	
29 April 1994	Noel V. Ginnitty	Sonny Knowles, Tony Kenny, Danny Doyle and Deirdre O'Callaghan
7 October 1994	Christy Moore	Billy Connolly via video from LA
17 March 1995	John O'Shea	Olivia O'Leary, Mick O'Dwyer, Jimmy Magee
19 April 1996	Dónal Lunny	Sharon Shannon
20 December 1996	Daniel O'Donnell	
27 March 1998	Michael Flatley	The Chieftains, Van Morrison
6 November 1998	Joe Dolan	
20 November 1998	Omagh	U2, The Corrs, Bob Geldof and Mary McAleese
19 May 2000	Mike Murphy	Gay Byrne, Joe Duffy
12 December 2007	Westlife	Bertie Ahern
22 February 2008	Ronnie Drew	U2, Andrea Corr, The Dubliners, Sinéad O'Connor and Kíla
1 December 2008	Joe Dolan	
19 December 2008	Boyzone	Louis Walsh and Eoghan Quigg
27 December 2008	Joe Dolan	Johnny Logan, Dustin the Turkey, Niamh Kavanagh, Paul Brady, Shane MacGowan, Ben Dolan, Larry Gogan and Sam Smyth
9 January 2009	Gaelic Athletic Association	The Saw Doctors and the Artane Boys Band, Bertie Ahern, Eamon Dunphy, Oliver Callan, Pat Spillane, Eileen Dunne, Brush Shiels and Tommy Fleming
5 November 2010	Johnny Giles	Nobby Stiles, Norman Hunter, Ray Houghton, Paul McGrath, Ronnie Whelan, Eamon Dunphy, Liam Brady and Bill O'Herlihy
18 November 2011	Brendan Grace	Red Hurley, Dickie Rock, Michael Flatley and Burt Reynolds
9 December 2011	Daniel O'Donnell	Pat Shortt, Jason Byrne, Sinitta, Aled Jones and Rebecca Ferguson
1 June 2012	The Late Late Show	Gay Byrne, Pat Kenny, Liam Neeson, Bono, Horslips, Patrick Kielty, Pat Shortt, Twink, Sinéad O'Connor and Imelda May
5 November 2019	Gay Byrne	Mary Black, Mary McAleese, Michael D. Higgins, Tommy Tiernan, Pat Kenny, Joe Duffy, Jon kenny, Frank McNamara, Pat Shortt, Finbar Furey and Bob Geldof

== See also ==
- List of The Late Late Show episodes
