= Live from the Gaiety =

Live album by The Dubliners
- Released: 2003
- Recorded: June 2002
- Genre: Irish folk music
- Length: 92:30

The Dubliners chronology
40 Years (2002)	Live from the Gaiety (2003)	Spirit Of The Irish (2003)

Live from the Gaiety is a live album by The Dubliners. It was recorded during the Irish leg of their tour celebrating forty years on the road. The double album was recorded at the Gaiety Theatre in Dublin in June 2002. A companion double DVD of the concert in its entirety was also released.

== CD listing ==
Disc one
No.	Title	Writer(s)	Lead vocal(s)	Length
1.	"The Black Velvet Band"	traditional	Seán Cannon	3:36
2.	"The Foggy Dew"	traditional	Paddy Reilly	3:42
3.	"The Banks of the Roses"	traditional	Cannon	2:35
4.	"Carrickfergus"	traditional	Jim McCann	8:05
5.	"McAlpine's Fusiliers"	Dominic Behan	Ronnie Drew	5:35
6.	"Seven Drunken Nights"	traditional	Drew	4:19
7.	"Don't Give It Up 'Til It's Over"	Johnny Duhan	Drew	4:00
8.	"South Australia"	traditional	Barney McKenna	5:25
9.	"Dublin in the Rare Oul' Times"	Pete St. John	Reilly	4:51
Total length:				42:08

Disc two
No.	Title	Writer(s)	Lead vocal(s)	Length
1.	"Whiskey in the Jar"	traditional	Cannon	4:52
2.	"Grace"	Seán O'Meara, Frank O'Meara	McCann	5:12
3.	"Chief O'Neill's/Trumpet Hornpipe/Mullingar Races"	traditional	instrumental	5:55
4.	"The Wild Rover"	traditional	Reilly, Drew, Cannon & McCann	4:09
5.	"Raglan Road"	Patrick Kavanagh	Drew	5:26
6.	"Rosin the Bow"	traditional	McCann	4:13
7.	"The Fields of Athenry"	St. John	Reilly	4:39
8.	"Marino Casino"	John Sheahan	instrumental	4:03
9.	"Dirty Old Town"	Ewan MacColl	Reilly	3:55
10.	"The Irish Rover"	traditional	Drew	4:03
11.	"Molly Malone"	traditional	Reilly	3:55
Total length:				50:22

== DVD listing ==
=== Disc 1 ===
1. "Fairmoye Lasses & Sporting Paddy" (Traditional)
  Instrumental, featuring John Sheahan on violin
2. "Foggy Dew" (Traditional)
  Lead vocal by Paddy Reilly
3. "Rare Old Times" (Pete St. John)
  Lead vocal by Paddy Reilly
4. "The Banks Of The Roses" (Traditional)
  Lead vocal by Seán Cannon
5. "Black Velvet Band" (Traditional)
  Lead vocal by Seán Cannon
6. "Showman's Fancy/Wonder Hornpipe/Swallow's Tail" (Traditional)
  Instrumental, featuring John Sheahan on tin whistle and Barney McKenna on tenor banjo
7. "Carrickfergus" (Traditional)
  Lead vocal by Jim McCann
8. "Lord of the Dance" (Sydney Carter)
  Lead vocal by Jim McCanndo
9. "McAlpine's Fusiliers" (Dominic Behan)
  Lead vocal by Ronnie Drew
10. "Raglan Road" (Patrick Kavanagh)
  Lead vocal by Ronnie Drew
11. "The Old House/Maid behind the Bar/Boyne Hunt/Shaskeen/High Reel" (Traditional)
  Instrumental, featuring Barney McKenna on tenor banjo
12. "Seven Drunken Nights" (Traditional)
  Lead vocal by Ronnie Drew

=== Disc 2 ===
1. Don't Give Up 'Til It's Over" (Johnny Duhan)
  Lead vocal by Ronnie Drew
2. The Town I Loved So Well" (Phil Coulter)
  Lead vocal by Paddy Reilly
3. "South Australia" (Traditional)
  Lead vocal by Barney McKenna
4. "Whiskey In The Jar" (Traditional)
  Lead vocal by Seán Cannon
5. "Grace" (Seán & Frank O'Meara)
  Lead vocal by Jim McCann
6. "Chief O'Neill's/Trumpet Hornpipe/Mullingar Races (Traditional)
  Instrumental, featuring Barney McKenna and John Sheahan on mandolins
7. "Dicey Reilly" (Traditional)
  Lead vocal by Ronnie Drew
8. "Cill Chais" (Traditional)
  Lead vocal by Seán Cannon
9. "Roisin The Bow" (Traditional)
  Lead vocal by Jim McCann
10. "Fields Of Athenry" (Pete St. John)
  Lead vocal by Paddy Reilly
11. "Marino Casino/Gerry Cronin's Reel/Denis Langton's Reel/The Irish Washerwoman" (Sheahan/Traditional/Trad/Trad)
  Instrumental, featuring John Sheahan on violin
12. "Dirty Old Town" (Ewan MacColl)
  Lead vocal by Paddy Reilly
13. "Wild Rover" (Traditional)
  Lead vocals by Paddy Reilly (first verse), Ronnie Drew (second verse), Seán Cannon (third verse) and Jim McCann (fourth verse)
14. "The Irish Rover" (Joseph Crofts)
  Lead vocal by Ronnie Drew
15. "Molly Malone" (Traditional)
  Lead vocal by Paddy Reilly

== Personnel ==
- Eamonn Campbell - acoustic guitar, mandolin, vocals
- Seán Cannon - acoustic guitar, vocals
- Ronnie Drew - acoustic guitar, vocals
- Jim McCann - acoustic guitar, vocals
- Barney McKenna - tenor banjo, mandolin, vocals
- Paddy Reilly - acoustic guitar, vocals
- John Sheahan - fiddle, tin whistle, mandolin, vocals
