= Live at Vicar Street (The Dubliners album) =

Live At Vicar Street

Live album by The Dubliners
- Released: 2006
- Genre: Irish folk

The Dubliners chronology
Live from the Gaiety (2002)	Live At Vicar Street (2006)	Too Late to Stop Now: The Very Best of the Dubliners (2006)

Live At Vicar Street is a live album recorded by The Dubliners at a concert at Vicar Street in Dublin on Sunday, 23 July 2006 as part of their Irish tour. A DVD and double CD of the concert were released. Ceoladh Sheahan joined her father and the band on stage for a rendition of "The Marino Waltz". This was the first of the band's albums to feature Patsy Watchorn, who replaced Paddy Reilly after nine years with the group. They were introduced by Jim McCann.

It was rated 3.5 stars by AllMusic.

== Track listing ==
=== Disc 1 ===
1. "The Fermoy Lassies/Sporting Paddy"
2. "The Black Velvet Band"
3. "The Spanish Lady"
4. "The Ferryman"
5. "The Rare Auld Times"
6. "The Belfast Hornpipe"
7. "The Pool Song"
8. "When the Boys Come Rolling Home"
9. "Luke's 21st Anniversary Poem"
10. "The Dublin Minstrel"
11. "Paddy On The Railway"
12. "I Wish I Had Someone to Love Me"
13. "The Maid Behind The Bar/The Boyne Hunt/The Shaskeen/The High Reel"
14. "I'll Tell Me Ma"

=== Disc 2 ===
1. "Kelly the Boy from Killane"
2. "Fiddler's Green"
3. "All For Me Grog"
4. "The Three Sea Captains/The Mullingar Races"
5. "The Rocky Road to Dublin"
6. "Finnegan's Wake"
7. "The Leaving of Liverpool"
8. "The Marino Waltz"
9. "The Foxrock Hornpipe/Ostinelli's Hornpipe"
10. "Dirty Old Town"
11. "Whiskey in the Jar"
12. "The Wild Rover"
13. "Molly Malone"
14. "The Irish Rover"

== Personnel ==
- Eamonn Campbell – vocals, acoustic guitar
- Seán Cannon – vocals, acoustic guitar
- Barney McKenna – vocals, tenor banjo
- John Sheahan – vocals, fiddle, tin whistle
- Patsy Watchorn – vocals, 5-string banjo
