= Dublin City Ramblers =

Irish folk band

The Dublin City Ramblers
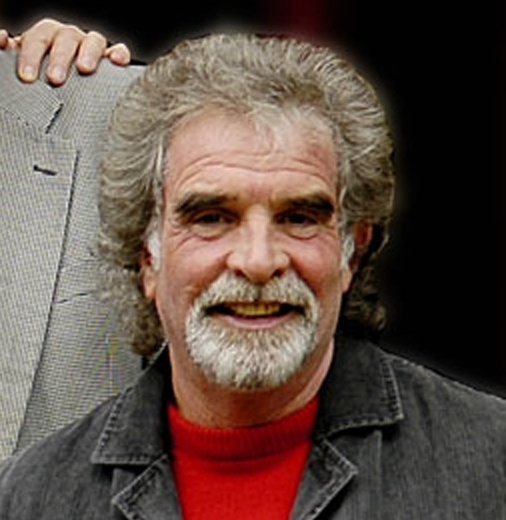
- Patsy Watchorn, member of the Dublin City Ramblers from 1970 to 1995.

Background information
- Origin: Dublin, Ireland
- Genre: Irish folk
- Years active: 1970–present
- Labels: Columbia, Lynwood Records, Dolphin Records
- Members: Sean McGuinness; Eoin Thomas; Tommy Mangan
- Past members: Martin Corcoran; Mick Crotty; Brendan Doyle; Kevin Gerahty; Shay Kavanagh; Derrick Keane; Stephen Leeson; Eddie Lynch; Philip McCaffrey; Tom Miller (Irish musician); Kevin Molloy; Freddie O'Connor; Paddy Sweeney; Patsy Watchorn; Pierce Plunkett; Paul Conway
- Website: www.dublincityramblers.com

The Dublin City Ramblers is an Irish folk band, originally formed by the name of The Quare Fellas in 1970. The band has had a long line of members and Sean McGuinness is the only current member of the original line-up, that also included Patsy Watchorn later member of The Dubliners.

== History ==
=== Early beginning ===
The Dublin City Ramblers began life in the mid-60s as The Jolly Tinkers, but due to the existence of ballad groups with the same name, they decided to change their name to The Quare Fellas. At this time the lineup consisted of Patsy Watchorn, brothers Sean and Matt McGuinness and Pat Cummins. While the group recorded the two albums At Home and A Fond Tale on the CBS label, they considered themselves part-time musicians. Pat Cummins left the band between the first and second CBS album and was replaced by Brendan Leeson.

=== 1970s ===
In 1970, the Quare Fellas disbanded and The "Dublin City Ramblers" were formed, with Patsy Watchorn, Sean McGuinness, Mick Crotty and Kevin Gerahty. This lineup lasted until approximately 1977.

When both Mick Crotty and Kevin Gerahty left the group in 1972, Philip "The Horse" McCaffrey (fiddle) and Kevin Molloy (guitar and vocals) joined. The four-piece of Patsy, Sean, Philip and Kevin went on to have a Top 10 hit album with their 1972 album A Nation Once Again. This was the group's most active period, releasing seven albums.

In 1978, the band released the album Irish Republican Jail Songs, which attracted significant attention and controversy in Ireland. The record featured tracks such as "Our Lads in Crumlin Jail" and "Over the Wall", with one of the most notable being "19 Men", a song referring to a Provisional IRA escape from Portlaoise Prison. The narrative of the song describes how the Gardaí and Irish Army personnel were unable to prevent the escape. The album also marked fiddle player Philip "the Horse" McCaffrey’s debut as a lead vocalist with the group. His first recorded song was "Bring Them Home", which addressed the Price Sisters' hunger strike and their campaign for repatriation to Northern Ireland. McCaffrey also performed "The Ballad of Tom Williams" and "Our Lads in Crumlin Jail" on the same record. A member of Dáil Éireann reportedly described the album in 1978 as "ludicrous and full of delusion".

=== 1980s ===
Between 1979 and 1987 The Dublin City Ramblers scored most of their hits, beginning with "The Rare Ould Times" (written by Pete St. John) through "John O'Dreams" to "The Punch and Judy Man," and "The Ferryman" (also by Pete St. John). In 1981 the band recorded an original ballad called "The Ballad of Bobby Sands, MP". They also had international success with their rendition of the folk tale "Wind in the Willows" in 1984.

The band released an entire original album in 1987, called The Flight of Earls (written by Liam Reilly of Bagatelle) and although the album included foot-tapping ballads such as "The Whistling Gypsy", "Right, all Right", "Botany Bay" and "The Dublin Rambler", this album was steeped so much in sadness, emigration and it was seen as their most melancholic, as the mid and late 80s were times of recession, loss and emigration in the Irish Republic. The album also included Phil Coulter's "Steal Away" and originals by The Dublin City Ramblers, "Farewell to Carlingford" and "Sailing Home".

Band members performed on The Boys in Green, the Republic of Ireland national football team's official song at Euro 1988. The band reworked the song for the 1990 World Cup, rereleasing it and playing it at the team's homecoming celebration.

In 1988, both Philip "the horse" McCaffrey and Kevin Molloy left the band, and Paddy Sweeney (formerly of the Barleycorn) stepped in and one album resulted, Home and Away. The Dublin City Ramblers then went on to call their next album Home & Away which included more original material like, "Dublin is Me", "Danny Farrell", "Wheel the perambulator, John" and the wintery classic "A Children's Winter".

=== 1990s and after ===
Shay Kavanagh joined in 1992 and this line up (Patsy, Sean, Paddy and Shay) released Recorded Live at Johnny Fox's Pub and The Craic and Porter Black, the latter being one of their better albums, an excursion through known Irish pub songs.. They supplied the official song for the 1994 Irish World Cup Soccer Team, "You'll Never Beat The Irish".

Unfortunately, The Craic was to be Patsy Watchorn's swan song, as he left the band in 1995 to pursue a solo career. He joined The Dubliners in 2005, taking Paddy Reilly's place.

Sean, Paddy and Shay continued to maintain a heavy touring schedule at home and in the US and released two albums, Raise The Roof (1997) and On Holy Ground (2000). In 1998 this formation went on to record an album and single called "Raise the Roof". It was recorded at Lynnwood recording studios at Lynn Cross, Mullingar, owned and run by Jimmy and Tommy Swarbrigg (of Irish Eurovision fame). In 2000, The Dublin City Ramblers released The Rare Oul' Times Millennium E.P. It included three of The Ramblers' original earlier singles "The Rare Ould Times", "Sailing Home" and "The Flight of Earls" It entered the Irish Charts at No. 28, and the week after, it remained at Number 22 for 3 weeks before leaving the Top 30 album charts 6 weeks later.

In 2002, both Paddy Sweeney and Shay Kavanagh left the group. Since then, there have been new members added to the group, including Pierce McAllorum, Stephen Leeson, Derrick Keane and others.

In the last ten to twelve years, the Dublin City Ramblers still carry on and tour, but only as a three-piece and with only one original member, Sean McGuinness. Patsy acted as the lead vocalist with The Dubliners, playing alongside Barney McKenna, John Sheahan, Eamonn Campbell and Sean Cannon until McKenna died in 2012, and Sheahan left, thus ending The Dubliners. Watchorn continues touring with the other members by the name of "The Dublin Legends". Patsy retired from The Dublin Legends in April 2014 due to health problems and was replaced by his brother Paul Watchorn, who is also a five-string banjo player and a former member of Sons of Erin.

Both Shay Kavanagh (Bass) and Stephen Leeson (Guitar & Vocals), veteran members who played in later lineups with the Dublin City Ramblers. Kavanagh replaced ex-Dubliner Eamonn Campbell in The Dublin Legends after Campbell died of a short illness in October 2017.

In April 2022 it was announced that former band member Phillip McCaffrey had died.

== Personnel ==
=== Current members ===
- Sean McGuinness – vocals, tenor banjo, mandolin (1970–present)
- Tommy Mangan – keyboards (2023–present)
- Eoin Thomas – vocals, guitar (2024–present)

=== Former members ===
- Patsy Watchorn – vocals, banjo, bodhrán (1970–1995)
- Mick Crotty – vocals, acoustic guitar (1970–1977)
- Kevin Gerahty – vocals, acoustic guitar, mandolin, fiddle (1970–1977)
- Philip McCaffrey – fiddle (1977–1988; died 2022)
- Kevin Molloy – vocals, guitar (1977–1988)
- Paddy Sweeney – vocals, guitar (1988–2002)
- Shay Kavanagh – vocals, bass guitar, rhythm guitar, bodhrán (1992–2002)
- Brendan Doyle – vocals, fiddle, tin whistle (1995-1998)
- Pierce Plunkett – vocals, guitar (2002–2005; 2013–2023)
- Eddie Lynch – keyboards (2002–2005)
- Stephen Leeson – vocals, guitar (2005–2007)
- Freddie O'Connor – keyboards (2005–2007)
- Tom Miller – vocals, bass guitar (2007–2017; died 2017)
- Derrick Keane – vocals, guitar (2007–2010)
- Michael Funge – vocals, guitar (2010–2012)
- Sean Conway – vocals, guitar (2012–2013)
- Martin Corcoran – vocals, keyboards, mandolin (2015–2018; died 2018)
- Paul Conway – keyboards (2018–2023)
- Roy Buckley – vocals, guitar (2023–2024)

== Select discography ==
The Quare Fellas

- At Home (1969 CBS)
- A Fond Tale (1970 CBS)

The Dublin City Ramblers

- A Nation Once Again (1972)
- Boys of the old Brigade (1973)
- End of it Someday (1974)
- Irish Republican Jail Songs (1978)
- The Rare Oul' Times (Original – 1980)
- The Ferryman (1983)
- DCR's Live in Dublin (1985)
- The Flight of Earls (1987)
- Home and Away (1989)
- Live at Johnny Fox's Pub (1992)
- You'll Never Beat the Irish (1993)
- Irish Football & Pub Songs (1994)
- The Craic & the Porter Black (1995)
- Raise the Roof (Lynwood Records, 1998)
- On Holy Ground (2000)
- Ireland My Ireland (Lynnwood Records, 2003)
- Saint Patricks Day (2008)
- Sing along with The DCR's
