= The Ballad of Ronnie Drew =

Single by U2, The Dubliners, Kíla and A Band of Bowsies
- B-side: Easy and Slow
- Released: 19 February 2008
- Recorded: January 2008
- Studio: Windmill Lane Studios, Dublin
- Genre: Irish folk, rock
- Length: 4:52
- Label: Universal Music
- Songwriters: Robert Hunter; Bono; The Edge; Simon Carmody
- Producer: John Reynolds

U2 singles chronology
"Window in the Skies" (2007)	"The Ballad of Ronnie Drew" (2008)	"Get On Your Boots" (2009)

Audio sample
- file; help

Music video
- "The Ballad of Ronnie Drew" at U2.com

"The Ballad of Ronnie Drew" is a single by U2, The Dubliners, Kíla and A Band of Bowsies. The single was recorded as a charitable project, with proceeds going to the Irish Cancer Society – owing to Ronnie Drew's cancer condition. It was recorded at Windmill Lane on 14 and 15 January 2008. "The Ballad of Ronnie Drew" is available as a CD in Ireland only. Ronnie Drew died a few months after the release of the single in August 2008.

Glen Hansard's vocals on the record were recorded over the telephone, and not in person, as he was in the United States for the 80th Academy Awards.

== Track listing ==
No.	Title	Writer(s)	Artist(s)	Length
1.	"The Ballad of Ronnie Drew"	Robert Hunter, Bono, the Edge and Simon Carmody	U2, The Dubliners, Kíla, and A Band of Bowsies	4:52
2.	"Easy and Slow"	Traditional	Ronnie Drew	3:06
Total length:				7:58

== Contributing artists ==
- Mary Black
- Paul Brady
- Moya Brennan
- Chris de Burgh
- Eamonn Campbell
- Paddy Casey
- Andrea Corr
- Mary Coughlan
- Damien Dempsey
- Christy Dignam
- The Edge
- Gavin Friday
- Bob Geldof
- Glen Hansard
- Robert Hunter
- Ronan Keating
- Kíla
- Barney McKenna
- Matt Molloy
- Christy Moore
- Shane MacGowan
- Mundy
- Joe Elliot
- Eleanor McEvoy
- Sinéad O'Connor
- Declan O'Rourke
- John Sheahan
- Duke Special
- Patsy Watchorn

== Chart information ==
Chart (2008)	Peak Position
Ireland (IRMA)	1
