= The Late Late Show Tribute to The Dubliners =

The Late Late Show Tribute
- Cover of the album

Live album by The Dubliners
- Released: 1987 (VHS), 2008 (DVD & CD)
- Recorded: 1987
- Genre: Irish folk
- Length: 51:21
- Label: IML

The Dubliners chronology
Live at Vicar Street	The Late Late Show Tribute	A Time to Remember

The Late Late Show Tribute is an album & film by The Dubliners recorded in 1987. The album charted at No.31 in Ireland.

The set originated as a special dedicated episode of RTE's The Late Late Show, hosted by Gay Byrne, on the occasion of the band's 25th anniversary year. As well as featuring a number of unique collaborations, the episode is notable for hosting the last public appearance of founding band member Ciarán Bourke, who - unable to perform with the band due to health issues - recited "The Lament for Brendan Behan".

Originally released in 1987 on VHS in PAL format, the episode was re-released on DVD in 2008, and also as a stand-alone album on CD the same year.

== Track list ==
1. "Seven Drunken Nights" - The Dubliners
2. "I Loved the Ground She Walked Upon" - Jim McCann With The Dubliners
3. "Dreaming My Dreams" - The Fureys & Davey Arthur
4. "Scorn Not His Simplicity" - Luke Kelly (archival footage)
5. "Luke - a Tribute" - Christy Moore With The Dubliners
6. "The Irish Rover" - The Pogues With The Dubliners
7. "The Marino Waltz" - The Dubliners
8. "The Humours of Glendart/Saddle the Pony/Brian O'Lynn" - The Fureys & Davey Arthur With The Dubliners
9. "Now I'm Easy" - Stockton's Wing With Ronnie Drew
10. "Springhill Mining Disaster" - U2
11. "Don't Get Married Girls" - The Dubliners
12. "McAlpine's Fusiliers" - The Dubliners
13. "The Black Velvet Band" - Christy Moore With The Dubliners
14. "Lament for Brendan Behan" - Ciáran Bourke
15. "The Auld Triangle" - Everybody

== Chart performance ==
Chart (2008)	Peak position
Irish Albums (IRMA)	31
