= Home, Boys, Home =

Compilation album by The Dubliners
- Released: 1979
- Genre: Irish folk

The Dubliners chronology
15 Years On (1977)	Home, Boys, Home (1979)	Together Again (1977)

Home, Boys, Home is a compilation album by The Dubliners.

== Track listing ==
=== Side One ===
1. "Mason's Apron"
2. "The Nightengale"
3. "The Holy Ground"
4. "Home Boys Home"
5. "Master McGrath"
6. "Love Is Pleasing"

=== Side Two ===
1. "Rocky Road To Dublin"
2. "Woman From Wexford"
3. "McAlpine's Fusiliers"
4. "Monto"
5. "The Patriot Game"
6. "The Wild Rover"
