= Too Late to Stop Now: The Very Best of the Dubliners =

Greatest hits album by The Dubliners
- Released: 2006
- Genre: Irish folk

The Dubliners chronology
Live at Vicar Street (2006)	Too Late to Stop Now: The Very Best of the Dubliners (2006)	The Very Best Of: The Dubliners (2009)

Too Late to Stop Now: The Very Best of the Dubliners is a career-spanning greatest hits collection of The Dubliners, released in 2006. The album charted at No.23 in Ireland and No.54 in the UK. Disc One features the hits, while Disc Two features selections recorded live at the Gaiety Theatre, Dublin in 2002, including some that were not included on the original Live From The Gaiety CD, but were included on the DVD.

== Disc 1 ==
1. Seven Drunken Nights
2. Gentleman Soldier
3. Finnegan's Wake
4. Liverpool Lou
5. Spanish Lady
6. Marino Waltz
7. Town I Loved So Well
8. Craic Was Ninety In The Isle Of Man
9. Three Lovely Lassies From Kimmage
10. Rose of Allendale
11. Whiskey In The Jar
12. Lark In The Morning
13. My Cavan Girl
14. Fiddler's Green
15. Cooley's/Dawn/Mullingar Races
16. Raglan Road
17. All For Me Grog
18. Auld Triangle
19. Molly Malone
20. Irish Rover

== Disc 2 ==
1. Fermoy Lassies/Sporting Paddy
2. Rare Auld Times
3. Black Velvet Band
4. Lord Of The Dance
5. McAlpine's Fusiliers
6. Showman's Fancy/Wonder Hornpipe/Swallow's Tail
7. Banks Of The Roses
8. Carrickfergus
9. Dicey Reilly
10. Old House
11. Whiskey in the Jar
12. South Australia
13. Fields of Athenry
14. Gerry Cronin's/Denis Langton's/Irish Washerwoman
15. Seven Drunken Nights
16. Dirty Old Town
17. Wild Rover
18. Irish Rover
