= Plain and Simple =

Studio album by The Dubliners
- Released: 1973
- Recorded: 1973
- Genre: Irish folk
- Label: Polydor
- Producer: Phil Coulter

The Dubliners chronology
Double Dubliners (1972)	Plain and Simple (1973)	Live (1974)

Plain and Simple is a studio album by The Dubliners, the last to be produced by Phil Coulter. Released on the Polydor label in 1973, it featured a number of tracks penned by Coulter himself, including "The Town I Loved So Well", written about The Troubles in his hometown of Derry, and "The Ballad of Ronnie's Mare", a satirical song inspired by Ronnie Drew's equestrian interests. It was the last studio album to feature all five original members of the group.

== Track listing ==
=== Side One ===
1. "Donegal Danny"
2. "Queen of the Fair/The Tongs by the Fire"
3. "Fiddler's Green"
4. "Johnston's Motor Car"
5. "The Wonder Hornpipe"
6. "The Jail of Cluian Meala"

=== Side Two ===
1. "The Town I Loved So Well"
2. "The Ballad of Ronnie's Mare"
3. "The Three Sea Captains"
4. "Skibbereen"
5. "Rebellion - Wrap the Green Flag 'Round Me Boys/The West's Awake/A Nation Once Again"

== Personnel ==
- Ronnie Drew
- Luke Kelly
- Barney McKenna
- Ciarán Bourke
- John Sheahan
