= Together Again (The Dubliners album) =

Studio album by The Dubliners
- Released: 1979
- Genre: Irish folk
- Label: Polydor, Chyme
- Producer: Pete St. John

The Dubliners chronology
15 Years On (1977)	Together Again (1979)	21 Years On (1983)

Professional ratings
Review scores
Source	Rating
Allmusic	3/5 stars

Together Again is a studio album by The Dubliners. Produced by Pete St. John and featuring four of his compositions, this album, released on the Chyme label in 1979, saw Ronnie Drew return to The Dubliners following Jim McCann's departure. This was the last studio album by The Dubliners to feature Luke Kelly.

== Track listing ==
All tracks Traditional, arranged by The Dubliners; except where indicated

=== Side One ===
1. "The Mero" (Pete St. John)
2. "The Rare Ould Times" (Pete St. John)
3. "Spey in Spate/The Steam Packet"
4. "Danny Farrell" (Pete St. John)
5. "Song of the Iron Road" (Ewan McColl)
6. "The Old Man" (Ian Campbell)

=== Side Two ===
1. "Johnny McGory" (Pete St. John)
2. "The Lag Song" (Ewan McColl)
3. "Sheahan's M1 Gig" (John Sheahan)
4. "And the Band Played Waltzing Matilda" (Eric Bogle)
5. "Toss the Feathers/Maid Behind the Bar"
6. "The Parting Glass"
