= A Time to Remember (album) =

Live album by The Dubliners
- Released: 2009
- Recorded: September 2009
- Genre: Irish Folk
- Length: 1:56:51
- Label: Celtic Airs

The Dubliners chronology
The Very Best Of: The Dubliners (2009)	A Time to Remember (2009)

A Time to Remember is the 2009 double album recording of the show by the same name, by The Dubliners, recorded in Vienna. First performed at Vicar Street, Dublin, on 4 July 2009 and later taken on tour around Europe, it was conceived as a tribute to their deceased members. The show features the group playing live to video and audio performances featuring former members Ciarán Bourke, Luke Kelly, and Ronnie Drew, as well as performances from The Dubliners' then current lineup. This is the last Dubliners' release featuring Barney McKenna, as he died in 2012. This also means that it is the last album to feature a founding member, as following McKenna's death, none of the founding members of the band are still alive.

== Track list ==
Disc 1:

1. "Introduction"
2. "Fermoy Lassies/Sporting Paddy"
3. "The Banks Of The Roses"
4. "The Ferryman"
5. "Three Score And Ten"
6. "The Belfast Hornpipe/The Swallow’s Tail"
7. "For What Died The Sons Of Róisín"
8. "Maids When You’re Young"
9. "The Nightingale"
10. "Luke’s Gravestone"
11. "Kelly the Boy from Killanne"
12. "The Black Velvet Band"
13. "The Town I Loved So Well"
14. "Cooley’s Reel/The Dawn/The Mullingar Races"
15. "The Auld Triangle"

Disc 2:

1. "All For Me Grog"
2. "Remembering Ciarán"
3. "Preab San Ól"
4. "Peggy Lettermore"
5. "St. Patrick’s Cathedral"
6. "I Wish I Had Someone To Love Me"
7. "Ronnie’s Heaven"
8. "McAlpine's Fusiliers"
9. "Fáinne Geal An Lae"
10. "Finnegan's Wake"
11. "The Marino Waltz"
12. "Dirty Old Town"
13. "Whiskey In The Jar"
14. "The Wild Rover"
15. "Molly Malone"
