= Drinking and Wenching =

Greatest hits album by The Dubliners
- Released: 1976
- Recorded: Various years: 1967-1969
- Genre: Irish Traditional Music, Pub Music
- Label: MFP
- Producer: Tommy Scott

Drinking and Wenching is a compilation album by The Dubliners released in 1976.

== Track list ==
1. "Seven Drunken Nights"
2. "A Pub With No Beer"
3. "Poor Old Dicey Riley"
4. "Sullivan's John"
5. "Maid Of The Sweet Brown Knowe"
6. "Black Velvet Band"
7. "Limerick Rake"
8. "Maids When You're Young Never Wed an Old Man"
9. "Quare Bungle Rye"
10. "Maloney Wants A Drink"
11. "Zoological Gardens"
12. "Nancy Whiskey"
