= Gerry O'Connor (banjo player) =

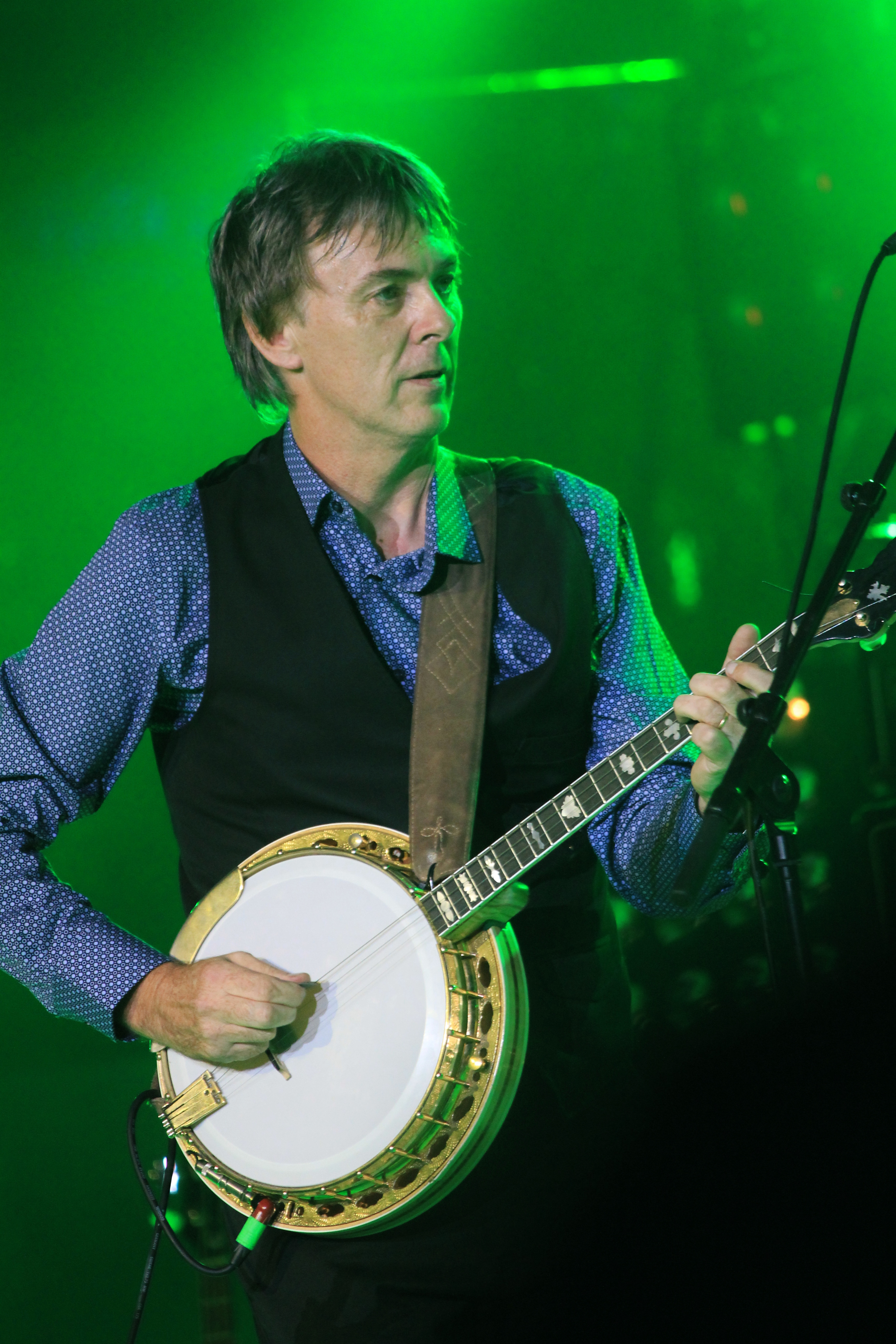
- Gerry O'Connor in 2014

Background information
- Born: Gerald O'Connor; 21 July 1960 (age 66); Nenagh, Tipperary, Ireland
- Origin: Portroe, County Tipperary, Ireland
- Genre: Irish folk
- Occupation: Musician
- Instruments: Banjo; violin; mandolin; guitar
- Years active: 1980s–present
- Website: www.gerryoconnor.com

Gerry O'Connor (born 21 July 1960 in Nenagh, County Tipperary, Ireland) is a traditional tenor banjo player. As Earl Hitchener (music critic for the Wall Street Journal) said, Gerry O'Connor can be considered at the moment "the single best four string banjoist in the history of Irish Music". He also plays mandolin, fiddle, guitar and tenor guitar.

O'Connor released four solo albums and his third one, titled No Place Like Home was named by Irish Times as Number 1 Traditional/Folk album of the year in 2004. After the sudden death of banjo player Barney McKenna on 5 April 2012, he entered The Dubliners to complete the planned tour, until the final shows at Vicar Street in Dublin, on 28/29/30 December. Barney McKenna himself said, about Gerry O'Connor: "He's my best pupil ever". Together with Eamonn Campbell, Patsy Watchorn and Seán Cannon, Gerry O'Connor plans to keep on touring in 2013 as The Dublin Legends.

In addition to his solo performances and recordings, O'Connor is a member of Four Men and a Dog. He also worked on Michael Flatley's Lord of the Dance soundtrack and guested over the years with many famous Irish artists such as The Waterboys, Mary Black, Arcady, Moya Brennan, Luka Bloom, Sharon Shannon and performed for US President Bill Clinton in Belfast during his historic visit to Ireland. More recently he has guested on Christy Moore's new album Folk Tale from 2011.

Gerry O'Connor was one of four musicians brought together by blues rock singer/guitar player Joe Bonamassa to perform on a variety of instruments in an acoustic concert at the Vienna Opera House on 3 July 2012. None of the five had never worked together nor even met, until they arrived in Vienna, where three days later they put on a live performance. The event was released on 12 March 2013 on CD&DVD/Blu-Ray, titled An Acoustic Evening At The Vienna Opera House, and in 2014 was broadcast on a PBS special.

O'Connor mainly plays CGDA tuned tenor banjo, instead of the usual Irish tuning GDAE. He plays a David Boyle banjo on almost every tour since 1996, but usually records with an Epiphone Recording A banjo.

== Discography ==
- Time To Time, 1991
- Myriad, 1998
- No Place Like Home, 2004
- High Up – Low Down, 2009
