= Brennan's Criterion Bar =

Former Irish pub in Bundoran, County Donegal, Ireland

- Type: Irish pub
- Location: Bundoran
- Coordinates: 54.4790°N 8.2779°W
- Built: Before 1900
- Original use: Guesthouse
- Owner: James Ward (1900–19??); James Brennan (1932?–1981); Nan Brennan (1981–2017); Patricia Brennan (1981–2018)

Brennan's Criterion Bar was an Irish pub in Bundoran, County Donegal.

== History ==
The pub opened for business on Saint Patrick's Day, 1900. Owners James and Catherine Ward bought a former guesthouse and converted it to a pub. In 1933 the Wards' daughter, Mary, married James Brennan, who remained behind the bar until 1981 when his two daughters, Nan and Patricia, took over the business. Nan worked while Patricia cooked (or so Nan told The Irish Times shortly before her death).

Part of the pub's appeal in its latter years was its lack of television, internet, and other modern conveniences (including live music), as well as its ban on swearing. Even professional musician and songwriter Phil Coulter, encouraged one evening to sing "The Town I Loved So Well", was not allowed to get away with breaking into song. In May 2015, TheJournal.ie named it on its list of "18 of the greatest Irish pubs that tourists (mostly) don't know about", stating: "Retreat here and find peace."

In 2013, Brennan's was featured in an RTÉ documentary, The Irish Pub. In March 2016, a reporter with The Boston Globe wrote a feature on the pub. In 2017, the sisters appeared together in a screen advertisement for Guinness. Nan's death in her early eighties in mid-August 2017 was reported in the national media. An elder sister, Cait, died in 2021, while a younger brother, Seamus, had died in 2007. Following Nan's death, Patricia (in her late seventies at the time her sister died) closed the pub. It shut its doors for the final time on the night of Sunday, 30 September 2018.
