= Patsy Watchorn =

Irish folk singer (born 1944)

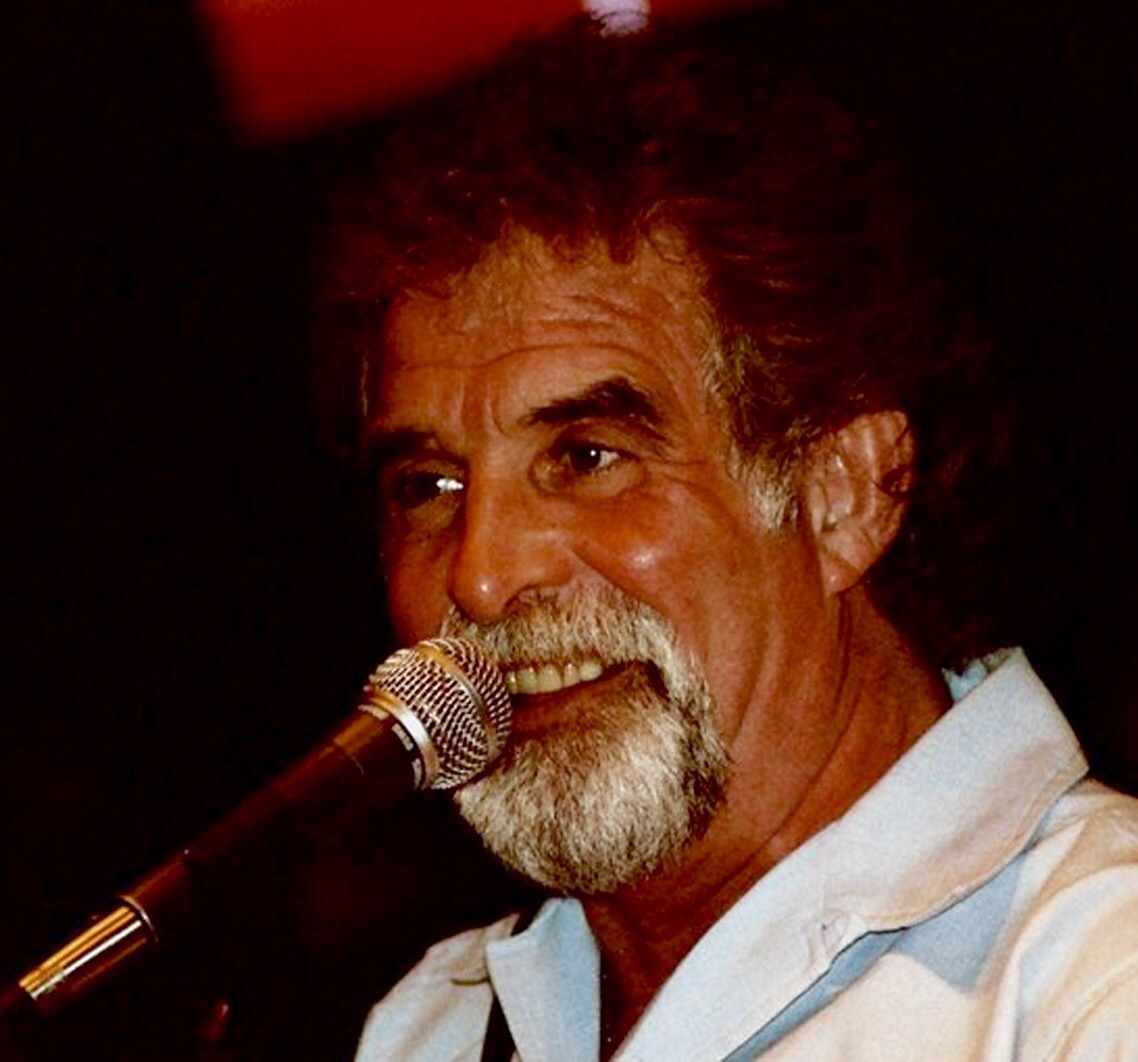
- Watchorn with The Dubliners, c. 2005

Background information
- Born: 16 October 1944 (age 82); Crumlin, Dublin, Ireland
- Origin: Dublin, Ireland
- Genre: Irish folk
- Occupation: Musician
- Instruments: Vocals; banjo; percussion
- Years active: 1969–2014
- Label: Dolphin Records
- Formerly of: Dublin City Ramblers (1969–1995); The Dubliners (2005–2012); The Dublin Legends (2013–2014)

Patsy Watchorn (born 16 October 1944) is an Irish folk singer. He is notable for being a member of the Dublin City Ramblers and later The Dubliners.

== Music career ==
Watchorn first came to prominence around 1969 as the lead singer of The Quare Fellas, a Dublin-based ballad group, in 1969. They evolved into the Dublin City Ramblers in the early 1970s and with Patsy as their lead singer they had hits with songs such as "The Rare Ould Times" and "The Ferryman", both of which were written by Pete St. John.

Patsy also wrote and sang the Irish Football Team anthem for their European Championship campaign in Germany and again for the World Cup in 1990 in Italy "We are the Boys in Green" (Home & Away Album) with The Dublin City Ramblers. The lyrics changed slightly in both releases in 1988 and 1990.

In 1995, Watchorn left the Dublin City Ramblers and made a number of solo albums. He joined The Dubliners in 2005, taking Paddy Reilly's place. He has appeared on their Tour Sampler EP in 2005, as well as the double album Live at Vicar Street (2006).

Patsy plays the banjo, bodhrán and spoons. He cites Luke Kelly, former lead singer with The Dubliners as his favourite singer. Patsy sang with the Dubliners and was well received throughout Ireland, the UK, Europe, Australia and the USA.

When The Dubliners announced their retirement in 2012 after finishing their 50 Years Anniversary Tour, Patsy Watchorn decided to keep on touring with former band members Seán Cannon and Eamonn Campbell and Banjo player Gerry O'Connor under the name of "The Dublin Legends".

On 28 April 2014 Patsy Watchorn posted a message on his website, stating that he "decided to take a break from the music business for a while" and will not be touring the rest of 2014 with "The Dublin Legends". He later admitted this was due to ill health and that doctors advised touring would do further damage to his health. His brother, Paul Watchorn, took his place in the band.

Watchorn's distinctive and passionate vocals have made him a huge rock on the Irish folk scene. In his solo projects in the mid and late 1990s after departing from his band The Dublin City Ramblers, he had session men who used to play alongside him and he used the stage name "Patsy Watchorn, agus a Cháirde" (which means "and his Friends" in Irish).

== Discography ==
- Pub with No Beer (1996)
- Sonia's Song (1996)
- The Craic and Porter Too (1998)
- Raised on Songs and Stories (2000)
- The Rare Old Times: The Very Best of Patsy Watchorn (2002)
- Hearts on Fire (2003)
- Irish Rebel Heroes (2004)
- Now (2011)
