= Wild Rover (album) =

- Cover to the original edition of the album

Compilation album by The Dubliners
- Released: 2011
- Recorded: 1960's – 2000's
- Genre: Irish folk
- Length: 51:21
- Label: Sanctuary Music
- Producer: 1:54:25

Wild Rover is a compilation album by The Dubliners that was released in 2011. The album charted at number 55 in Ireland.

== Track listing ==
1. Introduction
2. The Rocky Road To Dublin
3. Will You Come To The Bower
4. The Kerry Recruit
5. Medley: Dublin/Nelson's Farewell
6. Roisin Dubh
7. Medley: Silgo Maid/Colonel Rodney
8. Off To Dublin In The Green
9. Banks Of The Roses
10. The Patriot Game
11. The Old Orange Flute
12. Hot Asphalt
13. McAlpine's Fusiliers
14. Roddy MacCorley
15. Love Is Pleasing – The Dubliners, Luke Kelly
16. The Mason's Apron
17. The Holy Ground
18. The Nightingale – The Dubliners, Luke Kelly
19. Medley: The Donegal Reel/The Longford Collector
20. Finnegans Wake

Disc: 2

1. Within A Mile Of Dublin
2. Peggy Lettermore
3. My Love Is In America
4. I'll Tell My Ma
5. The High Reel
6. Medley: Sunshine Hornpipe/Mountain Road
7. The Leaving Of Liverpool
8. The Women From Wexford
9. Kitty Come Down From Limerick
10. Wild Rover
11. Preab San Ol
12. Jar Of Porter – The Dubliners, Luke Kelly
13. The Dublin Fusiliers
14. Tramps And Hawkers
15. Swallow's Tail – The Dubliners, Luke Kelly
16. Foggy Dew
17. The Glendalough Saint
18. Easy And Slow
19. Home Boys Home
20. Air Fa La La Lo

== Chart performance ==
Chart (2011)	Peak position
Irish Albums (IRMA)	55
Scottish Albums (OCC)	80
