= The Best of The Dubliners =

Compilation album by The Dubliners
- Released: 1967
- Genre: Irish folk
- Label: Transatlantic

The Best of The Dubliners is a UK 1967 compilation album by The Dubliners. It charted at No. 25 and remained in the top 40 chart in the UK for nearly three months.

== Charts ==
Chart (1967)	Peak position
UK Albums (OCC)	25
