= Rose of Allandale =

1830s English folk song

"Seven Popular Songs"; Glasgow, 1840s

"The Rose of Allandale" (also "The Rose of Allendale") is an English folk song, with words by Charles Jefferys and music by Sidney Nelson, composed in the 1830s and appearing in Blake's Young Flutist's Magazine in 1833. Because the song has been recorded by Paddy Reilly and Mary Black, many people mistakenly believe the song to be a (traditional) Irish song. It is also often believed to be of Scottish origin.

== Background ==
The Allandale referenced in the song is likely fictitious, and does not refer to a real place. Ambiguity comes partly due to the popular belief that the English song lyrics are about a maiden from the town of Allendale, Northumberland. It is also erroneously associated with Allandale, Scotland, a village which did not exist at the time of the song’s creation. It should be mentioned that the piece is not a traditional folk song from any particular region, although the lyrics do suggest that the 19th century writer had a Northern British setting in mind due to the mention of highlands.

In the British tradition of love songs, the rose is regarded as a beautiful and romantic flower. "Nicknames" are often given to the nicest or prettiest young woman or women of a region or village, e.g. "the Rose of...", "the Flower of...", "the Pride of..." (e.g. "the Rose of Tralee" and "the Flower of Magherally"). Similarly, in Phil the Fluther's Ball by Percy French, we find "The flower of Ardmagullion, and the pride of Pethravore."

Similarities with a translated version of an older German folk song having a comparable melody have led some to suggest that the song is rooted in an old "altwürttembergische Melodie" from the Rems valley. The Rems song is a soldier's farewell to his beloved, reflecting the unstable times of war.

== Recordings ==
The song was recorded in 1971 by The Copper Family in their box set "A Song For Every Season", which was issued by Leader Records. The Copper Family were perhaps the earliest of the revival singers to have sung it to recent popular audiences. The song has also been recorded by Paddy Reilly and Mary Black who are both Irish singers so the mistaken belief the song is a (traditional) Irish song is common. It is also often believed to be a Scottish song (because of the variant with Allandale). The song was also recorded by the popular Scottish folk singers The Corries, and the Irish band The Dubliners (e.g. on their 1987 album 25 Years Celebration) as well as in bagpipe versions, e.g. Grampian Police Pipe Band on their album Pipes and Drums of Scotland, song no. 13. Jean Redpath (a Scotswoman) recorded the song on her 1980 album Lowlands. The duo, Byrne and Kelly (members of Celtic Thunder, Neil Byrne and Ryan Kelly) recorded the song and it appears on their album, The Ballads Collection.
