= Further Along =

Album by The Dubliners

Studio album by The Dubliners
- Released: November 1996
- Recorded: January–March 1996
- Genre: Irish folk
- Label: Baycourt

The Dubliners chronology
Off to Dublin Green (1992)	Further Along (1996)	Alive Alive-O (1997)

Further Along is the title of a recording by The Dubliners. Following Ronnie Drew's departure from The Dubliners at the end of 1995, Paddy Reilly joined the group and this album was released in 1996 on their own new label, Baycourt.

== Track listing ==
1. "Step It Out Mary"
2. "Back in Durham Gaol"
3. "Reels - Sailing In/Alice's Reel"
4. "Coming of the Road"
5. "If Ever You Go to Dublin Town"
6. "Ar Éireann Ní Neosfainn Cé Hí"
7. "Dirty Old Town"
8. "Tá An Coileach Ag Fógairt An Lae"
9. "St. Patrick's Cathedral"
10. "The Crack Was Ninety in the Isle of Man"
11. "Song for Ireland"
12. "Job of Journeywork"
13. "Cavan Girl"
14. "Further Along"
15. "Jigs - Miss Zanussi/St. Martin's Day"
16. "Working Man"
