= The Rare Ould Times =

Song by Pete St. John

Song

from the album Rare Ould Times
- B-side: "Danny Farrell"
- Released: 1977
- Studio: Eamonn Andrews Studios
- Genre: Irish traditional
- Label: Dolphin
- Songwriter: Pete St. John
- Producer: Brian Masterson

singles chronology
"The Women Are Right" (1977)	"The Rare Ould Times" (1977)	"Danny Farrell" (1978)

"The Rare Ould Times" is a song composed by Pete St. John in the 1970s for the Dublin City Ramblers. It is sometimes called "Dublin in the Rare Ould Times", "Rare Ould Times," "The Rare Old Times", or "The Rare Auld Times".

== Story ==
In the song, the narrator, Seán Dempsey, who comes from Pimlico, a working-class neighbourhood in the Dublin Liberties, recalls his upbringing. He laments the changes that have occurred in the city since his youth—the 1950s and 1960s saw the beginning of intensive redevelopment for working-class inner-Dublin―mentioning the loss of Nelson's Pillar (1966), the Metropole ballroom (1972), the "Royal" (Theatre Royal, 1962). He dislikes the "grey unyielding concrete" and "new glass cages", the modern office blocks and flats being erected along the quays, and says farewell to Anna Liffey (the River Liffey). He worked as a cooper before being made redundant—Guinness Brewery gradually switched to metal kegs from the 1940s–80s and almost all their coopers were laid off.

He mentions a girlfriend, Peggy Dignam, a "child of Mary" (member of the Catholic sodality of the Children of Mary of the Sacred Heart). He lost her to "a student chap, with skin as black as coal," a reference to the large numbers of students from newly-independent African countries who studied in Dublin in the 1960s.

== Title and analysis ==
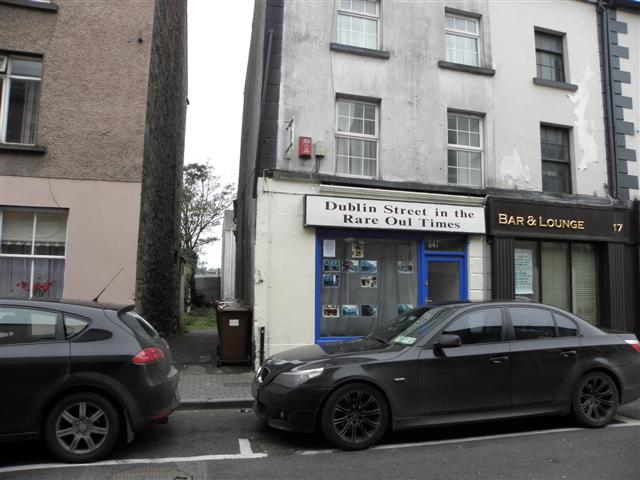
Dublin Street in the Rare Oul Times, Dublin Street, Monaghan. The shop name-check St John's song.

The phrase of the title―"rare ould times"―is deliberately suggestive of a perceived Golden Age, albeit one highly localised to Dublin. The term existed before the song; oul, or aul, is common in Hiberno-English and is often found in other forms, such as bould (bold) and cauld (cold). St John's usage popularised its use in everyday culture. He alludes to Dublin being a city of "songs and stories, haunting children's rhymes", portraying how "lyricism pervaded daily life": with radio not yet ubiquitous, song was the primary working-class method of communicating cultural memory, particularly in pubs.

Rare Ould Times, like many traditional Irish songs, conveys pride in the past and laments change. In the words of urban historian Penelope J. Corfield, the song "at once applaud[s] [Dublin's] urban magic and mourn[s] the spread of the 'grey unyielding concrete' which is blurring its special qualities". Stan Erraught of The Peridots has described it as both a bleak and "somewhat complex" song, referencing age and decay, and often performed as simple nostalgia for both the city and its working class community. However, argues Dr Fintan Vallely, such songs similarly represent a challenge to the Irish establishment as rebel music had that of the British—both genres being political ballads—calling it a "vital revival and reconstruction tool".

== Recording history ==
St. John was inspired to write the song on his return from the US in the early 1970s, when the architectural changes that had taken place were brand new.

The song was first recorded by the Dublin City Ramblers, who released it as a single in 1977. It has since been recorded by dozens of artists such as The Dubliners, the Irish Tenors, Paddy Reilly, The High Kings, Flogging Molly, Nathan Carter, Damien Dempsey and Kodaline. It was a number 1 hit in the Irish charts for Danny Doyle in January 1978.

The song remains popular in Ireland, particularly in Dublin. It is sung as a sporting anthem by fans of Dublin GAA teams.

Irish businessman Bill Cullen used the first two stanzas of the song as the epigraph for his 2004 memoir of growing up in inner-city Dublin, It's a Long Way from Penny Apples.

At St John's funeral, held in Dublin in 2022, fellow traditional singer-songwriter Phil Coulter told the assembly that St John was "now part of what was Dublin in the rare ould times". St John's son, Keiron Mooney, gave the oration and concluded with the lines of Rare Ould Times' final verse:

Fare thee well sweet Anna Liffey, I can no longer stay,

And watch the new glass cages, that spring up along the quay,

My mind’s too full of memories, too old to hear new chimes,

I’m a part of what was Dublin, in the Rare Oul Times.
