= Maids When You're Young Never Wed an Old Man =

"Maids When You're Young Never Wed An Old Man"
- Side A of the UK single

Single by The Dubliners

from the album Drinkin' and Courtin'
- B-side: "Quare Bungle Rye"
- Released: 20 December 1967
- Genre: Folk, Irish, pop
- Length: 3:45
- Label: Major Minor

The Dubliners singles chronology
"All For Me Grog" (1967)	"Maids When You're Young Never Wed An Old Man" (1967)	"Dirty Old Town" (1968)

"Maids When You're Young Never Wed An Old Man" is a traditional folk song recorded by the Dubliners and released as a single in December 1967. The song is known to have existed since at least the 18th century. The arrangement sung by the Dubliners was by Ewan McColl.

The song was seen to be offensive due to its sexualized themes and was banned by RTÉ and the BBC, resulting in its failing to make the UK top 40, instead peaking at No.43. It was the Dubliners' last hit single for over 20 years in the UK. The song also failed to make the top ten in Ireland, peaking at No.11.

== Charts ==
Chart (1967–68)	Peak position
Ireland (IRMA)	11
UK Singles (OCC)	43
