= Pete St John =

Irish singer-songwriter (1932–2022)

- Born: 31 January 1932; Dublin, Ireland
- Died: 12 March 2022 (aged 90)
- Genres: Folk

Peter Mooney (31 January 1932 – 12 March 2022), known professionally as Pete St John, was an Irish folk singer-songwriter. Born in Dublin, Ireland, he was best known for composing "The Fields of Athenry".

== Life and career ==
St John was born in Inchicore, Dublin in 1932. Educated at Synge Street CBS and trained as an electrician, he emigrated to Canada before returning to Ireland in the 1970s.

He wrote "The Fields of Athenry" in 1979, and it has been recorded by several artists, charting on the Irish Singles Chart on a number of occasions. A recording by Paddy Reilly, which was released in 1982, remained on the Irish charts for 72 weeks.

St John also composed a number of other modern ballads, such as "The Rare Ould Times" and "The Ferryman", which have been recorded by several artists, including the Dubliners, James Last, Paddy Reilly, and Mary Black. A version of "The Rare Ould Times", as sung by Danny Doyle, spent 11 weeks on the Irish Singles Chart, reaching No. 1 in 1978. St John's songs, including "The Rare Ould Times" and "The Ferryman", sometimes express regret for the loss of old certainties (for example the loss of Nelson's Pillar and the Metropole Ballroom, two symbols of old Dublin, as progress makes a "city of my town").

St John won several awards, including the Irish Music Rights Organisation's "Irish Songwriter of the Year". He died in Dublin on 12 March 2022, at the age of 90. After his funeral, Paddy Reilly and Glen Hansard performed "Fields of Athenry" at Beaumont House in Dublin as a tribute.

== See also ==
- Songs written by Pete St John
