= The Town I Loved So Well =

Song
- Songwriter: Phil Coulter

The Town I Loved So Well
MIDI recording

"The Town I Loved So Well" is a song written by Phil Coulter about his childhood in Derry, Northern Ireland. The first three verses are about the simple lifestyle he grew up with in Derry, while the final two deal with the Troubles, and lament how his placid hometown had become a major military outpost, plagued with violence. The final verse includes a message of hope for a "bright, brand new day", saying "They will not forget but their hearts are set / on tomorrow and peace once again".

Stuart Bailie has described the song as one of the few "nuanced" songs during the Troubles that both Unionists and Republicans could sing.

== Background ==
While Phil Coulter had written several Top 10 pop songs in the late 1960s (including Eurovision entries Puppet on a String and Congratulations), collaborations as a producer with The Dubliners and Luke Kelly, led to him writing a number of folk songs with more "grown-up" themes including those with a political aspect. Kelly had encouraged Coulter to contribute his opinions to the Irish conflict, but although his first attempt, Free the People, was successful in Ireland, Coulter felt it had too much sloganeering. Coulter, a nationalist, drew on both his own experience and that of his father (a member of the Royal Ulster Constabulary) to create a more nuanced lament for Derry, although he added that extreme unionists initially dismissed it as a "rebel song." The Town I Loved So Well was written against a backdrop of the Troubles in Derry, and released in 1973 on The Dubliners Plain and Simple album, which Coulter produced.

== Covers ==
In addition to its long association with Luke Kelly, Paddy Reilly also had some success with the song, charting for a total of 18 weeks at different times during the 1970s. The song has also been covered by Dexys, The High Kings, The Irish Tenors, Johnny Logan (on his 2007 album The Irish Connection), and Nathan Carter (on his 2012 album The Live Show).

The song has also been translated and covered in other languages, including by Tri Yann, a Breton band, under the title "La Ville que J'ai Tant Aimée" with lyrics in French. Dafydd Iwan recorded a translation in Welsh ("Y Dref a Gerais i Cyd", 'The Town I Loved So Long'), with Hannes Wader recording a German version ("Kleine Stadt") - a tribute to Wissembourg in northeastern France, favourite town of his -, and Lillebjørn Nilsen a Norwegian version ("Byen Jeg Kjente Som Min").

In 1984, a performance of the song by Jim McCann was used as the theme music for the NBC made-for-television film Children in the Crossfire.

== Notable performances ==
An instrumental version of the song was played at the funeral of the Northern Ireland politician and Nobel laureate John Hume on 5 August 2020. Hume and Coulter were close friends, and the song was said to be a favourite of Hume's.

== See also ==
- List of Irish ballads
