= McAlpine's Fusiliers =

Irish ballad

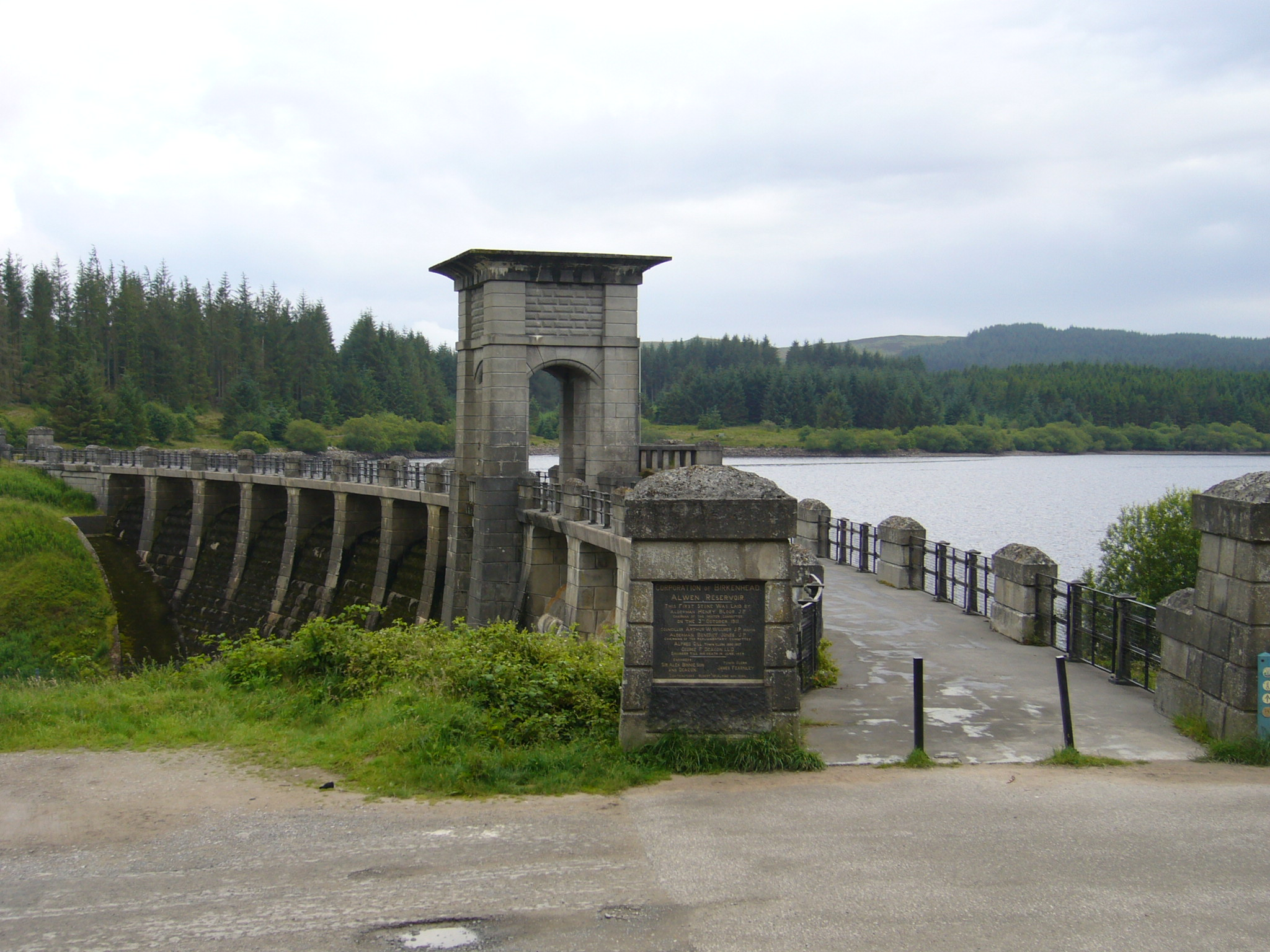
Alwen Dam in North Wales is only a few miles from where the song's protagonists landed, and was built by Sir Robert McAlpine's company

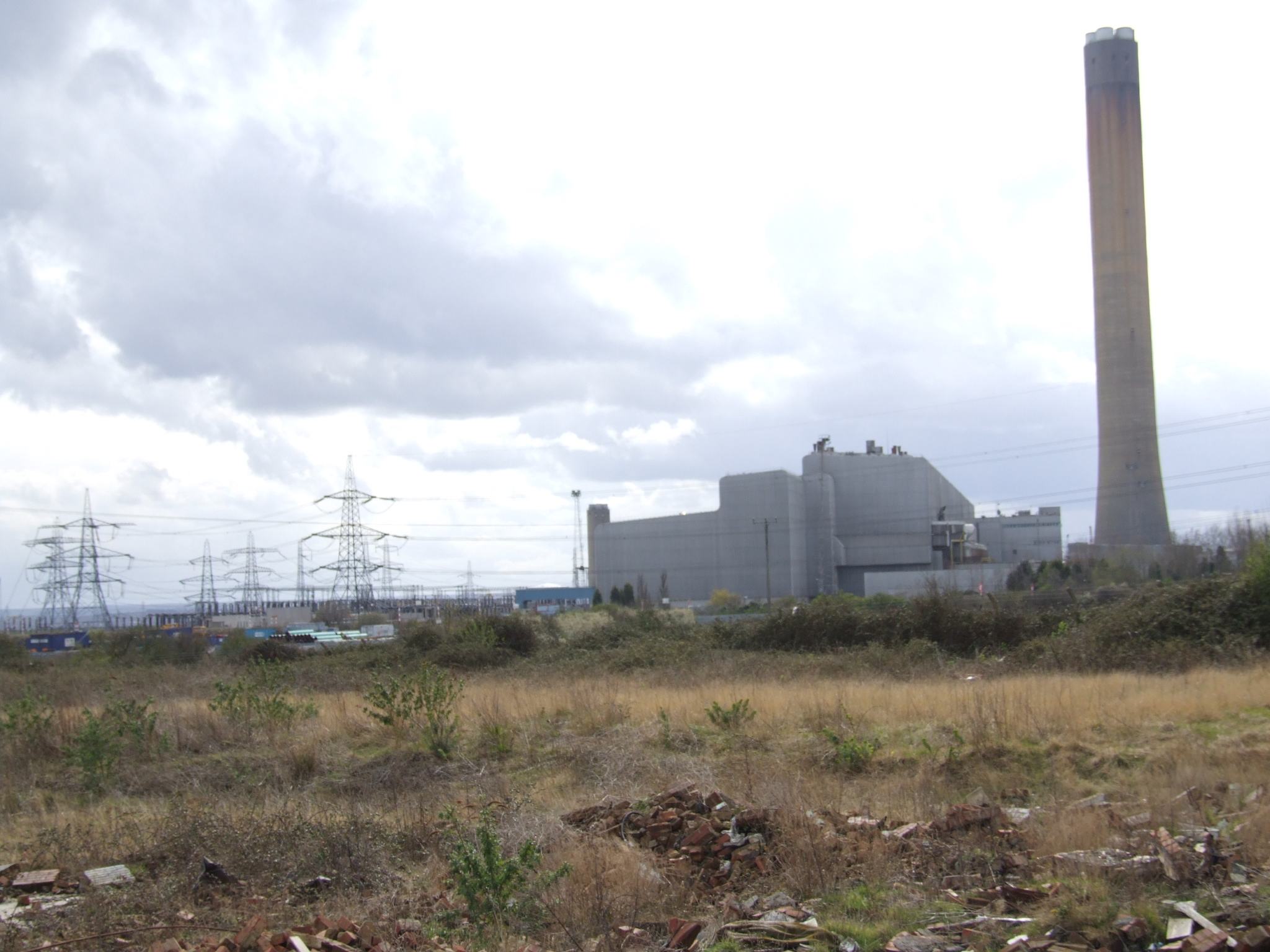
The song mentions the Isle of Grain. This is the power station there

"McAlpine's Fusiliers" is an Irish ballad, set to a traditional air, which was popularised in the early 1960s by Dominic Behan.

The song relates to the migration of Irish labourers from Ireland to Britain during the 20th century. The ballad's title refers to the eponymous construction company of Sir Robert McAlpine, a major employer of Irish workmen at the time. John Laing and George Wimpey (also referred to in the opening monologue; a part not included in some cover versions of the song) were other major construction companies employing Irish 'navvies' (a British term referring to building labourers and originally coined for the labourers who built the British canals or 'navigations').

The colloquial and local terms in the song's monologue and lyrics include references to a 'spike' (a hostel or 'reception centre' sometimes used by Irish navvies who could not find or afford lodgings) and to 'shuttering' (a rapidly constructed wooden casing made to hold concrete while it sets). Holyhead, also referred to in the monologue, is a port on Anglesey (Ynys Môn) in Wales where the main ferry service across the Irish Sea from Dún Laoghaire used to dock. Cricklewood is a district of North West London which had a relatively large Irish population. The Isle of Grain is an area in Kent where the River Medway joins the Thames Estuary east of London which was a large construction site for several years while a large power station was built there. The song offers a view of the life and work of the Irish labourers of the times and as such proved popular.

Some sources suggest that the words of the song were derived from an earlier poem or poems by Irish labourer Martin Henry, with the song's arrangement attributed to Dominic Behan. Along with a number of other songs, Behan provided the song to The Dubliners for use in a new set-structure. In its original form, the song was performed in two parts, a spoken monologue (originally spoken by Ronnie Drew of The Dubliners self-accompanied by his flamenco guitar) followed by the sung verses supported by the full band.

The song has also been recorded by Paddy Reilly, The Clancy Brothers, The Capitol Showband, Pecker Dunne, the Young Dubliners and others.
