= Seán Cannon =

Irish musician (born 1940)

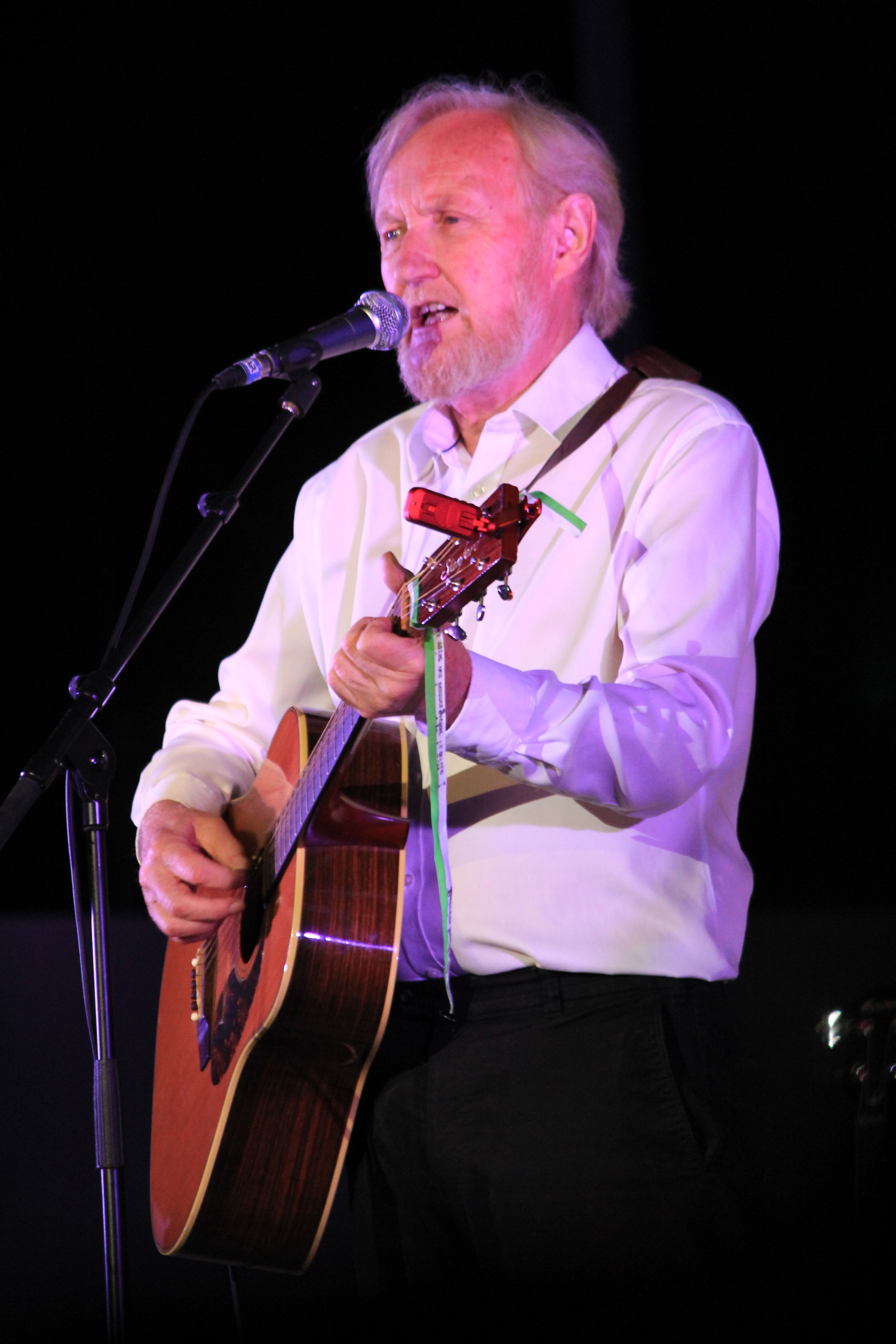
- Seán Cannon in 2014

Background information
- Born: 29 November 1940 (age 85); Galway, Ireland
- Origin: Galway, Ireland
- Genres: Irish folk
- Occupation: Musician
- Instruments: Vocals; guitar; mandola
- Years active: 1962–present

Seán Cannon (born 29 November 1940) is an Irish musician. Since 1982 he has been a guitarist for The Dubliners and their follow-up-band The Dublin Legends.

== Early life ==
Seán Cannon was born in Claddagh, Galway, Ireland. His family moved from Galway to Coventry in 1955. He travelled around Europe at an early age, rambling in England, Germany, Switzerland and Spain. Whilst living in Tübingen, Germany, Cannon acquired a guitar and learnt local folk songs and ballads. It was during these trips that Cannon learned to speak several languages. He moved to England and became a renowned solo artist, playing in almost every folk club in Britain.

== Career ==
By 1969, Cannon had joined an England-based folk group called "The Gaels". The Gaels consisted of three Irishmen and a Scotsman. They released an album. Cannon also released three solo albums in the 1970s.

Cannon had known The Dubliners since the 1960s, and, like Eamonn Campbell, joined them on stage on numerous occasions. When lead singer Luke Kelly became ill in 1980, he stepped in, and became a full-time Dubliner in 1983 when Kelly departed. Cannon is known for singing songs in the Irish language ("Peggy Lettermore", "Fáinne Gael an Lae", "Cill Cháis") and humorous a cappella songs like "The Waterford Boys", "The Pool Song" or "The Sick Note".

When The Dubliners announced their retirement in 2012 after finishing their 50th Anniversary Tour, Cannon decided to keep on touring with former band members Patsy Watchorn and Eamonn Campbell and Banjo player Gerry O'Connor under the name of "The Dublin Legends".

Cannon still manages to do some solo work in between the touring. He played gigs with Irish songwriter Pat Cooksey and more recently with his sons, James and Robert Cannon. They called themselves "The Cannons" and they performed traditional Irish folk music as well as songs by Shane MacGowan, Bob Dylan, Johnny Cash and Hank Williams. In 2020, "The Cannons" ended, due to the Coronavirus Pandemic.

== Personal life ==
Cannon married Pamela Blick, and has 2 sons, James and Robert. He later separated. Cannon lives in Coventry, United Kingdom. His father, James Cannon, was born in Donegal, but moved to Galway, where he married Catherine Byrne who came from Ballinue, Aughrim, Co Galway.

== Discography ==
=== The Gaels ===
- The Gaels (Midland Sound, 1969)

=== As a solo artist ===
- Woes of War (Mount Recording Studio, 1974)
- The Roving Journeyman (Cottage Records, 1977)
- Erin the Green (Ogham Records, 1979)

=== The Dubliners ===
- All albums from 1983 to 2012—see The Dubliners discography

=== The Dublin Legends ===
- An Evening with The Dublin Legends: Live in Vienna (2014)
- The Dublin Legends Perform The Dublin Sessions (2016)
- The Dublin Legends Perform The Dublin Sessions Vol. 2 (2017)
- The Dublin Legends (2025)

=== The Cannons ===
- The Cannons (2011)
- Live in Salzgitter, Germany 2015 (double CD, 2016)

== Trivia ==
Cannon is immortalised in the Christy Moore song "Lisdoonvarna". The line "Seán Cannon Doing Back Stage Cooking" is a direct reference to when Seán travelled to all the music festivals in the late 1970s with a converted caravan and sold curry.
