= The Dubliners =

Irish folk band

- Ciarán Bourke, Luke Kelly, John Sheahan, Barney McKenna, Ronnie Drew

Background information
- Origin: Dublin, Ireland
- Genre: Irish folk
- Years active: 1962–2012
- Labels: Columbia, Epic, Legacy, Major Minor, EMI, Transatlantic, Polydor, Stiff, CHYME, Lunar, Harmac, Baycourt
- Past members: Ciarán Bourke; Ronnie Drew; Luke Kelly; Barney McKenna; Bob Lynch; John Sheahan; Jim McCann; Sean Cannon; Eamonn Campbell; Paddy Reilly; Patsy Watchorn

The Dubliners (/ˈdʌblɪnərz/) were an Irish folk band founded in Dublin in 1962 as The Ronnie Drew Ballad Group, named after its founding member; they subsequently renamed themselves The Dubliners. The line-up saw many changes in personnel over their fifty-year career, but the group's success was centred on lead singers Luke Kelly and Ronnie Drew. The band achieved international success with their lively Irish folk songs, traditional street ballads, and instrumentals.

The band were regulars on the folk scenes in both Dublin and London in the early 1960s. They were signed to the Major Minor label in 1965 after backing from Dominic Behan who was paid by the label to work with the group and help them to build a better act fit for larger concert hall venues. The Dubliners worked with Behan regularly between 1965 and 1966; Behan wrote numerous songs for this act, including the song "McAlpine's Fusiliers" created specifically to showcase Ronnie Drew's gravel voice. They went on to receive extensive airplay on Radio Caroline, which was part-owned by Phil Solomon CEO of Major Minor, and eventually appeared on Top of the Pops in 1967 with hits "Seven Drunken Nights" (which sold over 250,000 copies in the UK) and "The Black Velvet Band". Often performing political songs considered controversial at the time, they drew criticism from some folk purists. Ireland's national broadcaster RTÉ placed an unofficial ban on their music from 1967 to 1971. During this time the band's popularity began to spread across mainland Europe, and they appeared on The Ed Sullivan Show in the United States. The group's success remained steady through the 1970s, and a number of collaborations with The Pogues in 1987 saw them enter the UK Singles Chart on another two occasions.

The Dubliners were instrumental in popularising Irish folk music in Europe. They influenced many generations of Irish bands and their legacy can to this day be heard in the music of artists such as The Pogues, Dropkick Murphys and Flogging Molly. One of the most influential Irish acts of the 20th century, they celebrated 50 years together in 2012, making them Ireland's longest-surviving musical act. Also in 2012, the BBC Radio 2 Folk Awards bestowed them with a Lifetime Achievement Award. The Dubliners announced their retirement in the autumn of 2012, after 50 years of performing, following the death of the last living original member Barney McKenna. However, some members of the group continued touring under the name of The Dublin Legends. As of 2026, Sean Cannon is the only remaining member of the Dubliners in that group, following the retirement of Patsy Watchorn in 2014 and the death of Eamonn Campbell in 2017.

== Formation and history ==
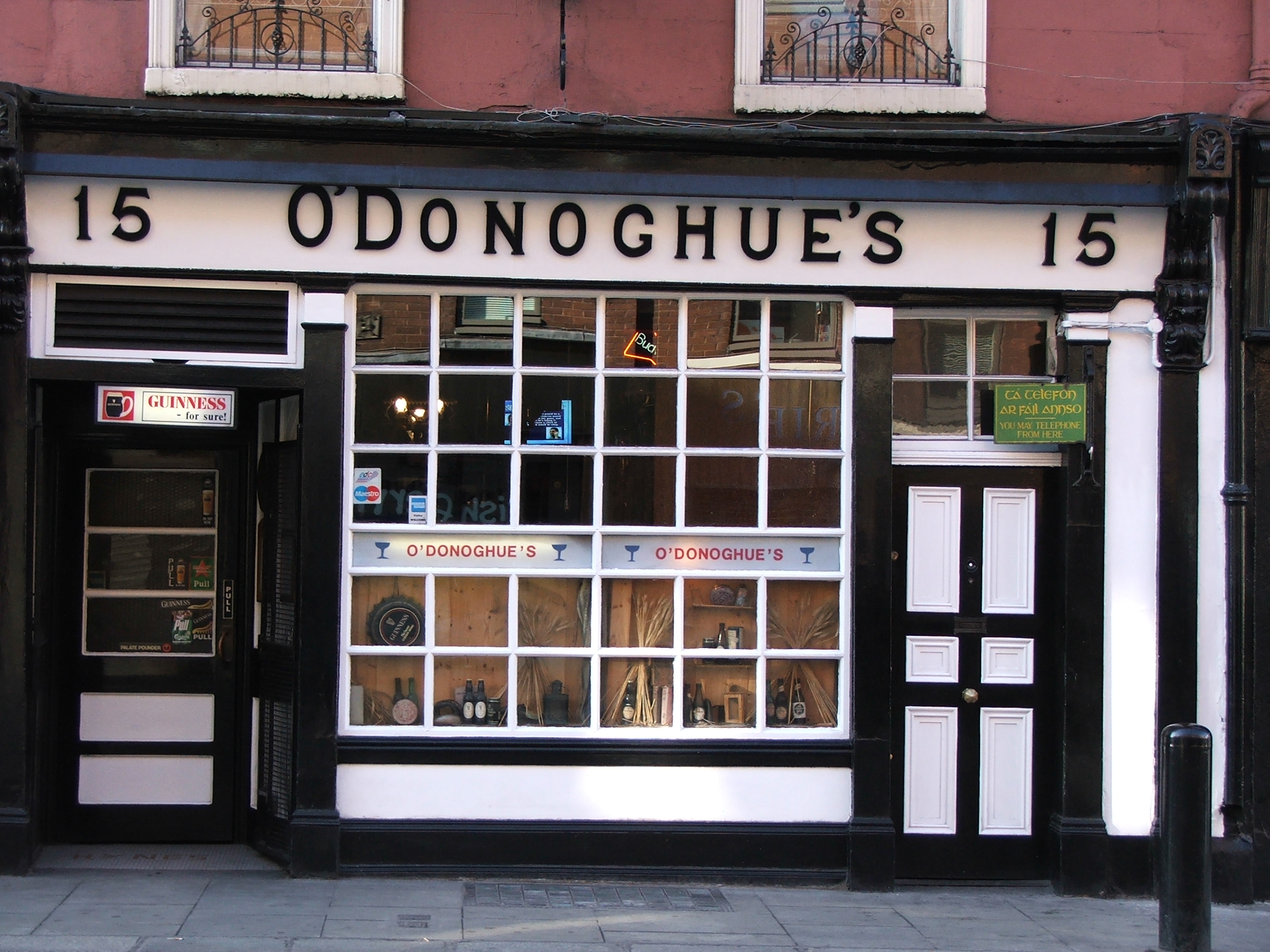
O'Donoghue's Pub on Merrion Row, Dublin, where the group played regularly in the early 1960s.

=== Origins ===
The Dubliners, initially known as "The Ronnie Drew Ballad Group", formed in 1962 and made a name for themselves playing regularly in O'Donoghue's Pub in Dublin. The change of name came about because of Ronnie Drew's unhappiness with it, together with the fact that Luke Kelly was reading Dubliners by James Joyce at the time. Founding members were Drew, Kelly, Ciarán Bourke and Barney McKenna.

Drew, McKenna and Thomas Whelan had originally teamed up for a fundraising concert and then went on to work in a revue with the Irish comedian John Molloy at the Gaiety Theatre in Dublin. They used to sing songs between acts.

Before joining the Dubliners full-time, Kelly had spent some time playing at English folk clubs such as the Jug o'Punch in Birmingham, run by the folk singer Ian Campbell.

The group played at the Edinburgh Festival in 1963 and that led to them being featured on a BBC programme called Hootenanny. The extra exposure helped them to win a contract with Transatlantic Records, with whom they recorded their first album, called simply The Dubliners. They also recorded their first single featuring "Rocky Road to Dublin" and "The Wild Rover".

=== Members of the group ===
Drew spent some time in Spain in his younger years where he learned to play Flamenco guitar, and he accompanied his songs on a Spanish guitar. Drew left the band in 1974 to spend more time with his family, and was replaced by Jim McCann. He returned to The Dubliners five years later, but left the group again in 1995. Ronnie Drew died at St Vincent's Private Hospital in Dublin on 16 August 2008 after a long illness. Paddy Reilly took Drew's place in 1995. Some of Drew's most significant contributions to the band are the hit single "Seven Drunken Nights", his rendition of "Finnegan's Wake", and "McAlpine's Fusiliers".

Luke Kelly was more of a balladeer than Drew, and he played chords on the five-string banjo. Kelly sang many defining versions of traditional songs like "The Black Velvet Band", "Whiskey in the Jar", "Home Boys Home"; but also Phil Coulter's "The Town I Loved So Well", Ewan MacColl's "Dirty Old Town", "The Wild Rover", and "Raglan Road", written by the famous Irish poet Patrick Kavanagh. In 1980, Luke Kelly was diagnosed with a brain tumour. Occasionally Kelly was too ill to sing though he was sometimes able to join the band for a few songs. While on tour in Germany he collapsed on stage. When Kelly was too ill to play, he was replaced by Seán Cannon. He continued to tour with the band until two months before his death. Kelly died on 30 January 1984. One of the last concerts in which he took part was recorded and released: Live in Carré, recorded in Amsterdam, Netherlands, released in 1983. In November 2004, the Dublin city council voted unanimously to erect a bronze statue of Luke Kelly. Kelly is buried in Glasnevin Cemetery in Dublin.

Ciarán Bourke was a singer, but he also played the guitar and tin whistle. He sang many songs in Irish ("Peggy Lettermore", "Preab san Ól"). In 1974, he collapsed on stage after suffering a brain haemorrhage. A second haemorrhage left him paralysed on his left side. Bourke died in 1988. The band did not officially replace him until his death.

John Sheahan and Bobby Lynch joined the band in 1964. They had been playing during the interval at concerts, and usually stayed on for the second half of the show. When Luke Kelly moved to England in 1964, Lynch was taken on as his temporary replacement. When Kelly returned in 1965, Lynch left the band and Sheahan stayed. According to Sheahan, he was never (and still has not been) ever officially asked to join the band. Sheahan is the only member to have had a musical education. Lynch committed suicide in Dublin in 1982.

=== Later changes and tours ===
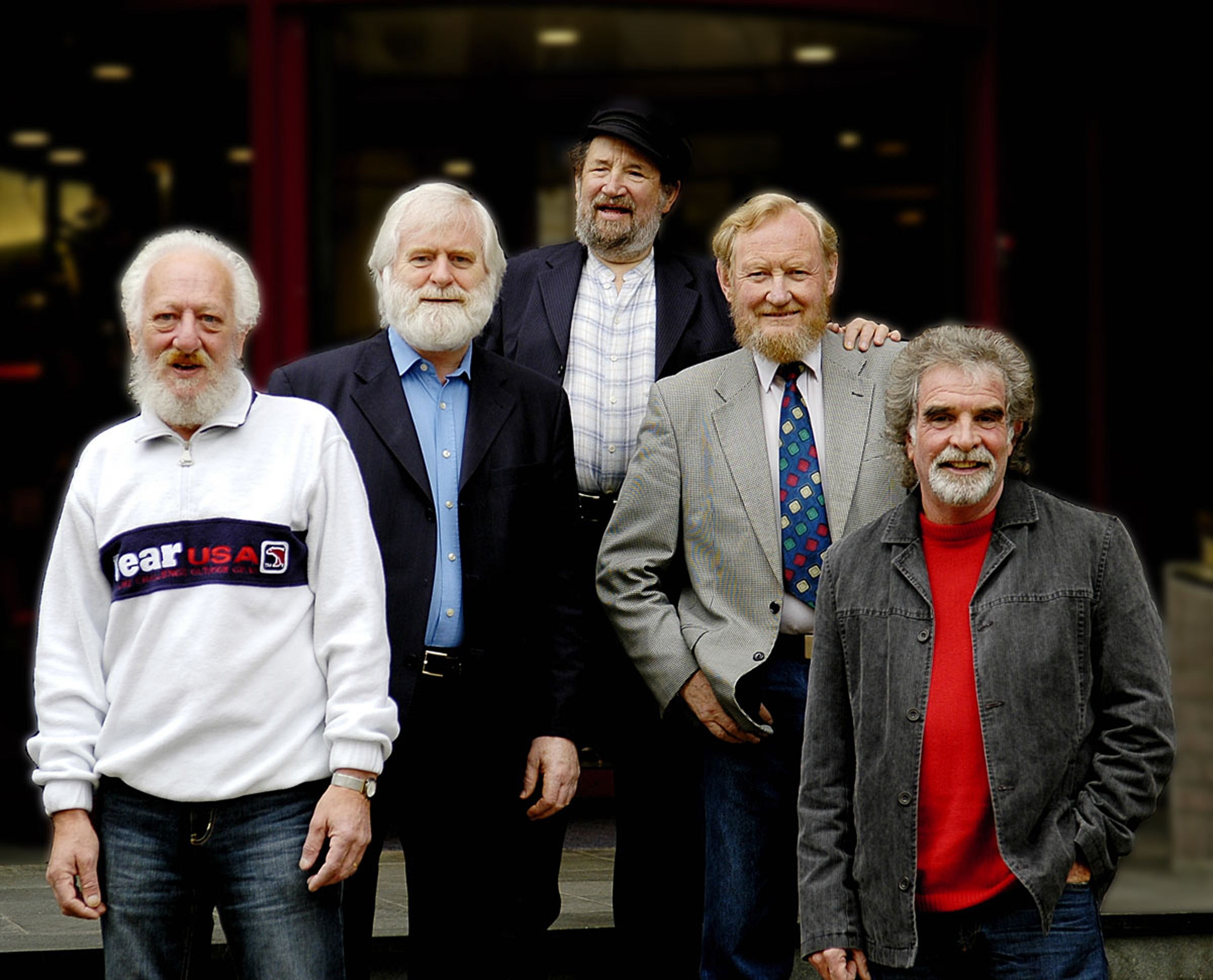
The Dubliners in 2005. L-R: Eamonn Campbell, John Sheahan, Barney McKenna, Seán Cannon, Patsy Watchorn.

In 1996, Ronnie Drew quit the band, and Paddy Reilly came on to replace him. Reilly, a long-time friend of the group, toured with them before on several occasions; he was already a successful solo artist in Ireland, scoring hits with "The Fields of Athenry" and "The Town I Loved So Well".

In 2005, Paddy Reilly moved to the United States, and Patsy Watchorn joined the group. Watchorn made a name for himself with The Dublin City Ramblers; like Kelly, he accompanies his songs on the five-string banjo.

The band toured Europe every year. A planned tour of Denmark two weeks after the death of McKenna on 5 April 2012 went ahead as planned. From the first show in Copenhagen on 18 April onwards he was replaced by the Irish banjo player Gerry O'Connor. In the autumn of 2012, the band announced their retirement, effective after their 50th anniversary shows at the end of the year. The Dubliners played their final shows at Vicar Street in Dublin on 28/29/30 December 2012, and made their final TV appearance in the UK on a pre-recorded New Year's Eve edition of Jools Holland Annual Hootenanny on 31 December. Their last public appearance as the Dubliners was on 27 January 2013 in memory of Barney McKenna.

== Reunions ==
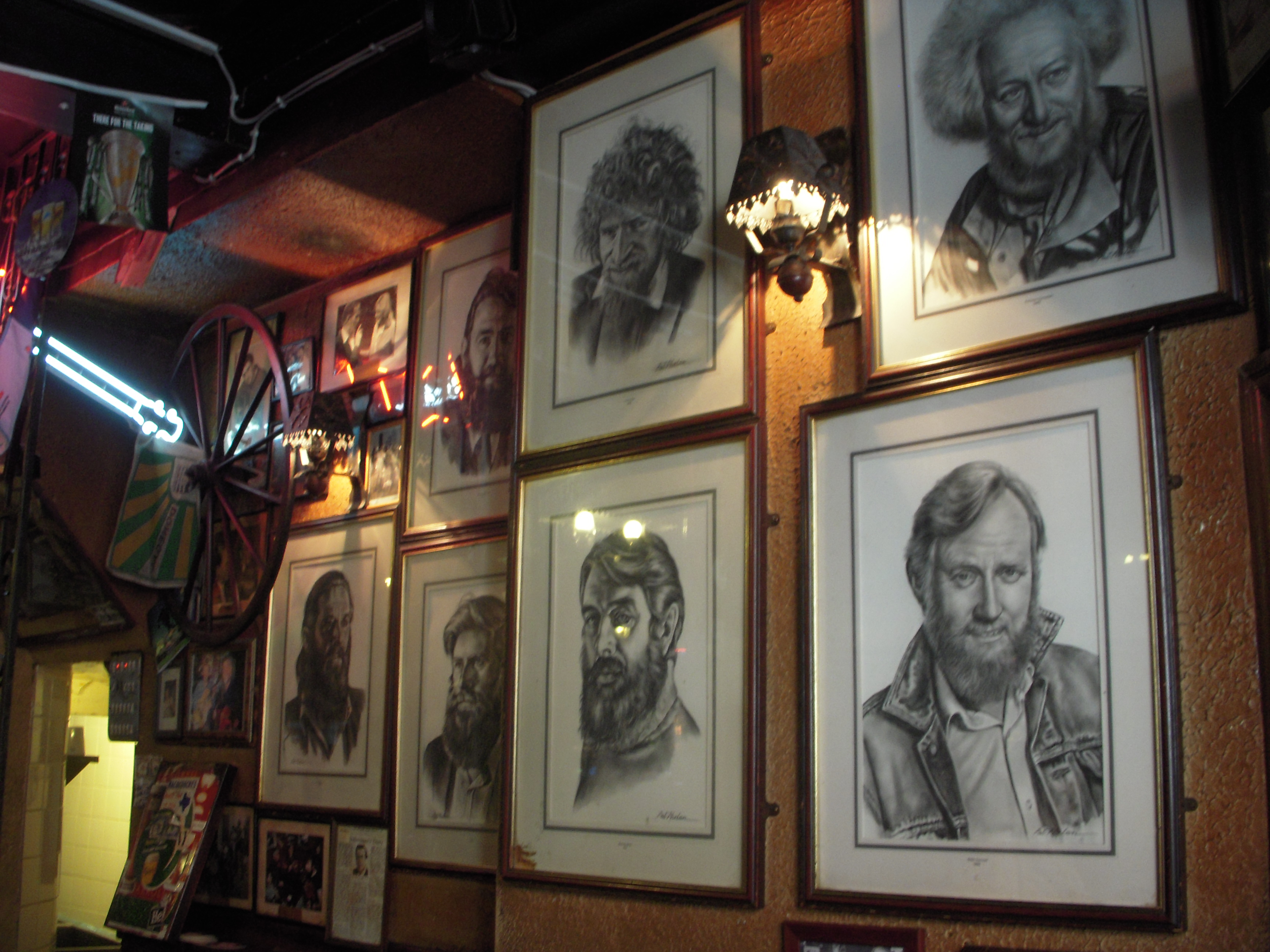
A wall in O'Donoghue's dedicated to The Dubliners

=== 25th anniversary ===
In 1987, The Dubliners celebrated their 25th anniversary. They recorded a double CD, produced by Eamonn Campbell, a long-time friend and guest musician. He introduced them to The Pogues, and their collaboration resulted in a hit with "The Irish Rover". It reached No. 8 in the UK singles chart and No. 1 in Ireland. In 1990, their final hit single was "Jack's Heroes/Whiskey in the Jar", again with The Pogues, which reached No. 63 in the UK and No. 4 in Ireland. Campbell, who plays the guitar on stage, has been touring with the band ever since. Christy Moore, Paddy Reilly and Jim McCann also featured on the CD; Moore sings a tribute to Luke Kelly, and McCann sings the song "I Loved the Ground She Walked Upon", written by Phil Coulter and Ralph McTell. The following year, to coincide with Dublin's millennial celebrations, Raidió Teilifís Éireann produced an hour-long special on the band and the city's influence on their music, titled The Dubliner's Dublin.

=== 40th anniversary ===
In 2002, they temporarily reunited with Ronnie Drew and Jim McCann, for their 40th anniversary tour. They made a string of appearances on Irish television throughout this time, including a memorable appearance with Phil Coulter and George Murphy on RTÉ 1.

After the tour, Jim McCann was diagnosed with throat cancer and, though he fully recovered, his voice was severely damaged, and he was unable to sing since his illness. Despite this, he regularly acted as MC at folk gigs, notably at The Dubliners reunion shows, and at the 2006 Legends of Irish Folk shows (where he also played guitar in the finale).

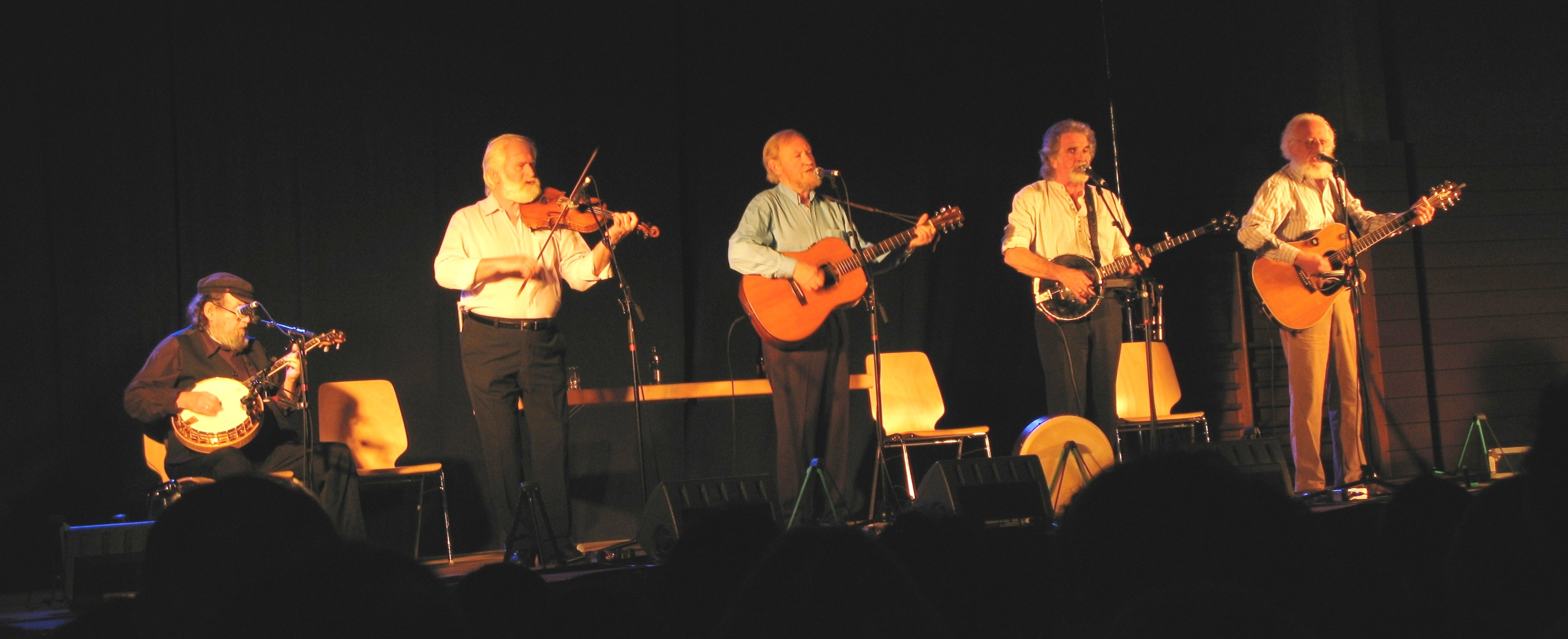
The Dubliners performing in Luxembourg, 11 October 2008

=== 50th anniversary ===
In 2012, the band celebrated their 50th anniversary with an extensive year-long European tour and the release of a live DVD recorded live at Dublin's Vicar Street featuring Chris Kavanagh from the Band "The Legend of Luke Kelly" as a special guest. The tour continued in the wake of the death of the final founding member Barney McKenna, although the band announced that the final shows of the tour, to be held 28–30 December also at Vicar Street would be the band's final shows in which the band were joined by former band member Jim McCann.

== Success ==
The Dubliners with president Higgins of Ireland in 2012. L-R: Gerry O'Connor, Eamonn Campbell, Sean Cannon, John Sheahan, President Michael Higgins and Paddy Reilly

The Dubliners became well known, not just in Ireland but also as pioneers for Irish folk in Europe and also (though less successful) in the United States. Their 1967 recordings of "Seven Drunken Nights" and "The Black Velvet Band" were released on the fledgling Major Minor label, and were heavily promoted on pirate radio station Radio Caroline. The result was that both records reached the top 20 in the UK singles chart. A third single, "Maids When You're Young Never Wed an Old Man" reached No. 43 in December 1967. It was their last UK hit single till they recorded with The Pogues in 1987.

In 1974, Ronnie Drew decided to quit the band, to spend more time with his family. He was replaced with Jim McCann. Before joining the band McCann had a TV show in the early seventies called The McCann man. He is best known for his incarnations of "Carrickfergus", Makem's "Four Green Fields", and "Lord of the Dance". He stayed with the band until 1979 when he left to start a solo career; then Ronnie Drew rejoined the band. First Ronnie went to Norway to record two songs in the Norwegian language with the Norwegian band Bergeners.

The Dubliners also gained popularity amongst famous musicians such as Bob Dylan, Roy Orbison, Jimi Hendrix and Pink Floyd's drummer Nick Mason, who were all self-proclaimed Dubliners fans.

In the 1960s, The Dubliners sang rebel songs such as "The Old Alarm Clock", "The Foggy Dew" and "Off to Dublin in the Green". However, the conflict in Northern Ireland from 1969 onwards led them to drop most of these from their repertoire. They resumed performing such songs occasionally towards the end of their career. They have also recorded satirical protest songs against nuclear weapons such as "The Button Pusher" and "Protect and Survive", feminist songs such as "Don't Get Married", and socialist songs such as "Joe Hill".

On 8 February 2012, The Dubliners received a "Lifetime Achievement Award" at the 2012 BBC Radio 2 Folk Awards.

== Personnel ==
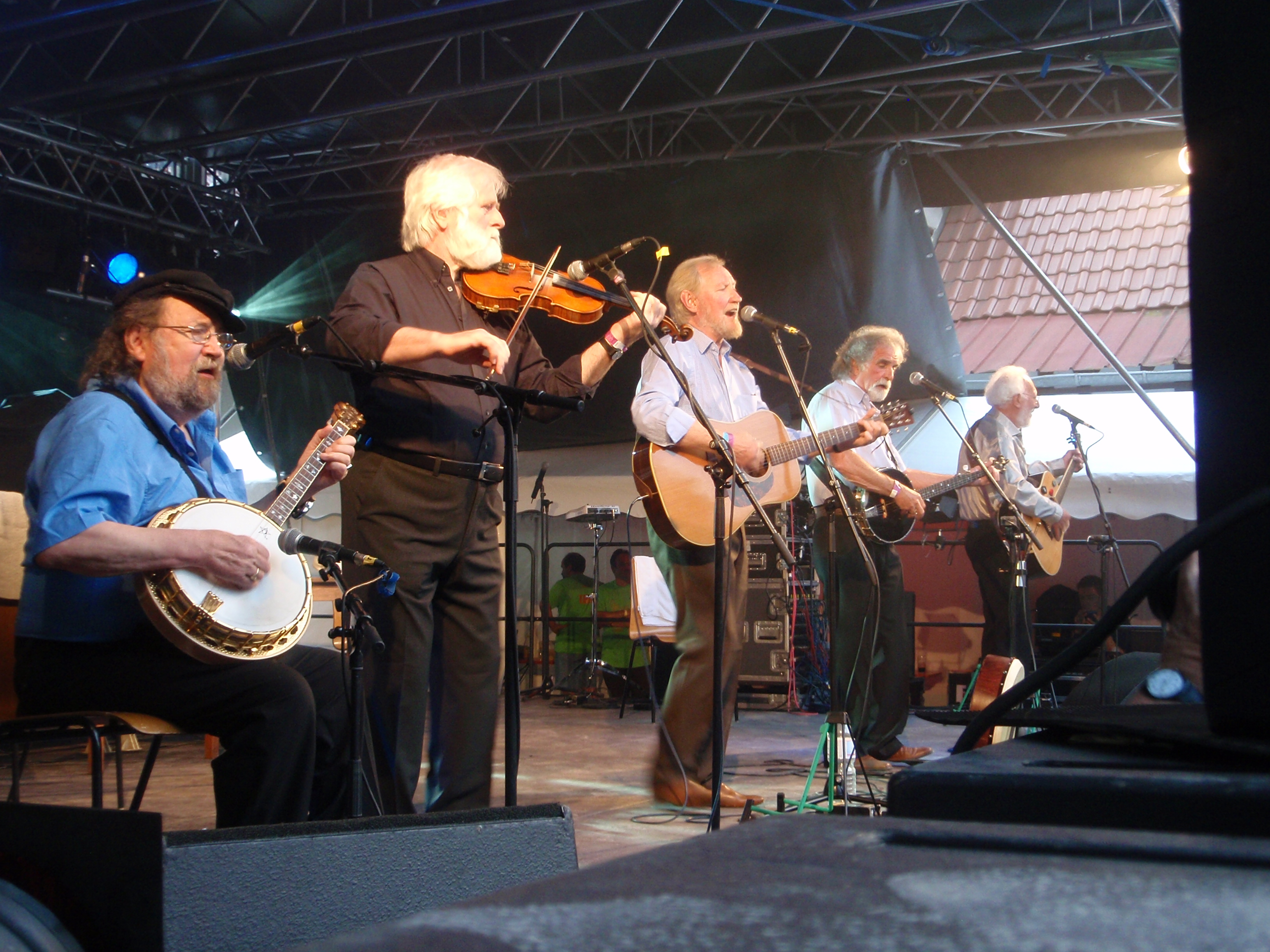
The Dubliners performing at the 2010 International Folk Festival in Bad Rappenau, Germany. Pictured left to right are Barney McKenna, John Sheahan, Seán Cannon, Patsy Watchorn, and Eamonn Campbell.

=== Members ===
- Ciarán Bourke – vocals, guitar, tin whistle (1962–73, 1973–74; guest – 1987; died 1988)
- Ronnie Drew – vocals, guitar (1962–74, 1979–95, 2002; guest – 1978, 2005; died 2008)
- Luke Kelly – vocals, banjo (1962–65, 1965–83; died 1984)
- Barney McKenna – Irish tenor banjo, mandolin, melodeon, fiddle, vocals (1962–2012; died 2012)
- Bobby Lynch – vocals, guitar (1964–65; died 1982)
- John Sheahan – fiddle, mandolin, tin whistle, concertina, guitar (1964–2012)
- Jim McCann – vocals, guitar (1973, 1974–79, 1984, 1987, 2002; guest – 2009, 2011, 2012; died 2015)
- Seán Cannon – vocals, guitar (1982–2012)
- Eamonn Campbell – guitar, mandolin (1984, 1988–2012; died 2017)
- Paddy Reilly – vocals, guitar (1984, 1995–2005; guest – 2011)
- Patsy Watchorn – vocals, banjo, bodhrán, spoons (2005–2012)
- Gerry O'Connor – Irish tenor banjo (2005, 2012)

=== Guest musicians ===
- Mary Jordan (1960s)
- Ann Mulqueen (1962–63)
- John Reavey (1964–66)
- Danny Doyle (1970s)
- Michael Howard – guitar (1980s, 2006)
- Nigel Warren-Green – cello (1983–84)
- Bobby Kelly (1986)
- Gerry O'Connor – Irish tenor banjo (2005, 2012)
- Chris Kavanagh – vocals, banjo (2011–12)
- Al O'Donnell – vocals, guitar (2011)
- Neill Martin – Cello (2012)
- Christy Sheridan – Irish tenor banjo (2012)

=== Line-ups ===
| 1962–64 | 1964–65 | 1965–73 | 1973 (Bourke temporarily replaced due to illness) |
|---|---|---|---|
| Ronnie Drew – vocals, guitar; Luke Kelly – vocals, banjo; Barney McKenna – Irish tenor banjo, mandolin, melodeon, vocals; Ciarán Bourke – vocals, guitar, tin whistle | Ronnie Drew – vocals, guitar; Barney McKenna – Irish tenor banjo, mandolin, melodeon, vocals; Ciarán Bourke – vocals, guitar, tin whistle; Bobby Lynch – vocals, guitar; John Sheahan – fiddle, mandolin, tin whistle, concertina | Ronnie Drew – vocals, guitar; Luke Kelly – vocals, banjo; Barney McKenna – Irish tenor banjo, mandolin, melodeon, vocals; Ciarán Bourke – vocals, guitar, tin whistle; John Sheahan – fiddle, mandolin, tin whistle, concertina | Ronnie Drew – vocals, guitar; Luke Kelly – vocals, banjo; Barney McKenna – Irish tenor banjo, mandolin, melodeon, vocals; John Sheahan – fiddle, mandolin, tin whistle, concertina; Jim McCann – vocals, guitar |
| 1973–74 | 1974–79 | 1979–82 | 1982–83 |
| Ronnie Drew – vocals, guitar; Luke Kelly – vocals, banjo; Barney McKenna – Irish tenor banjo, mandolin, melodeon, vocals; Ciarán Bourke – vocals, guitar, tin whistle; John Sheahan – fiddle, mandolin, tin whistle, concertina | Luke Kelly – vocals, banjo; Barney McKenna – Irish tenor banjo, mandolin, melodeon, vocals; John Sheahan – fiddle, mandolin, tin whistle, concertina; Jim McCann – vocals, guitar | Ronnie Drew – vocals, guitar; Luke Kelly – vocals, banjo; Barney McKenna – Irish tenor banjo, mandolin, melodeon, vocals; John Sheahan – fiddle, mandolin, tin whistle, concertina | Ronnie Drew – vocals, guitar; Luke Kelly – vocals, banjo; Barney McKenna – Irish tenor banjo, mandolin, melodeon, vocals; John Sheahan – fiddle, mandolin, tin whistle, concertina; Seán Cannon – vocals, guitar |
| 1983–88 | 1984 (RTÉ's Festival of Folk Concert) | 1988–95 | 1995–2005 |
| Ronnie Drew – vocals, guitar; Barney McKenna – Irish tenor banjo, mandolin, melodeon, vocals; John Sheahan – fiddle, mandolin, tin whistle, concertina; Seán Cannon – vocals, guitar | Ronnie Drew – vocals, guitar; Barney McKenna – Irish tenor banjo, mandolin, melodeon, vocals; John Sheahan – fiddle, mandolin, tin whistle, concertina; Jim McCann – vocals, guitar; Seán Cannon – vocals, guitar; Eamonn Campbell – guitar, mandolin; Paddy Reilly – vocals, guitar | Ronnie Drew – vocals, guitar; Barney McKenna – Irish tenor banjo, mandolin, melodeon, vocals; John Sheahan – fiddle, mandolin, tin whistle, concertina; Seán Cannon – vocals, guitar; Eamonn Campbell – guitar, mandolin | Barney McKenna – Irish tenor banjo, mandolin, melodeon, vocals; John Sheahan – fiddle, mandolin, tin whistle, concertina; Seán Cannon – vocals, guitar; Eamonn Campbell – guitar, mandolin; Paddy Reilly – vocals, guitar |
| 2002 (40 Years Reunion Tour) | 2005–12 | 2012 | 2013–14 (As "The Dublin Legends") |
| Ronnie Drew – vocals, guitar; Barney McKenna – Irish tenor banjo, mandolin, melodeon, vocals; John Sheahan – fiddle, mandolin, tin whistle, concertina; Jim McCann – vocals, guitar; Seán Cannon – vocals, guitar; Eamonn Campbell – guitar, mandolin; Paddy Reilly – vocals, guitar | Barney McKenna – Irish tenor banjo, mandolin, melodeon, vocals; John Sheahan – fiddle, mandolin, tin whistle, concertina; Seán Cannon – vocals, guitar; Eamonn Campbell – guitar, mandolin; Patsy Watchorn – vocals, banjo, bodhrán, spoons | John Sheahan – fiddle, mandolin, tin whistle, concertina; Seán Cannon – vocals, guitar; Eamonn Campbell – guitar, mandolin; Patsy Watchorn – vocals, banjo, bodhrán, spoons | Seán Cannon – vocals, guitar; Gerry O'Connor – Irish tenor banjo, violin; Eamonn Campbell – guitar, mandolin; Patsy Watchorn – vocals, banjo, bodhrán, spoons |
| 2014–17 (As "The Dublin Legends") | 2017–present (As "The Dublin Legends") | 2020 (Reunion) |
| Seán Cannon – vocals, guitar; Gerry O'Connor – Irish tenor banjo, violin; Eamonn Campbell – guitar, mandolin; Paul Watchorn – vocals, banjo, guitar | Seán Cannon – vocals, guitar, octave mandola; Gerry O'Connor – Irish tenor banjo, violin; Shay Kavanagh – guitar, vocals; Paul Watchorn – vocals, banjo, guitar | John Sheahan – fiddle, mandolin, tin whistle, concertina; Sean Cannon – vocals, guitar; Gerry O'Connor – Irish tenor banjo, violin; Shay Kavanagh – guitar, vocals; Paul Watchorn – vocals, banjo, guitar |

== Discography ==
See: The Dubliners discography

=== Original albums ===
- 1964 The Dubliners (Live)
- 1965 In Concert (Live)
- 1966 Finnegan Wakes (Live)
- 1967 A Drop of the Hard Stuff (a.k.a. Seven Drunken Nights)
- 1967 More of the Hard Stuff
- 1968 Drinkin' and Courtin' (a.k.a. I Know My Love)
- 1968 At It Again (a.k.a. Seven Deadly Sins)
- 1969 Live at the Albert Hall (Live)
- 1969 At Home with The Dubliners
- 1970 Revolution
- 1972 Hometown (Live)
- 1972 Double Dubliners (a.k.a. Alive And Well)
- 1973 Plain and Simple
- 1974 Live (Live)
- 1975 Now
- 1976 A Parcel of Rogues
- 1977 Live at Montreux (Live)
- 1977 15 Years On
- 1979 Together Again
- 1983 21 Years On (Live)
- 1983 Prodigal Sons
- 1985 Live In Carré (Live)
- 1987 25 Years Celebration
- 1988 Dubliner's Dublin
- 1992 30 Years A-Greying
- 1996 Further Along
- 1997 Alive Alive-O (Live)
- 2002 40 Years (features old and new songs)
- 2002 Live From The Gaiety (Live)
- 2006 Live At Vicar Street (Live)
- 2008 The Late Late Show Tribute to The Dubliners (Recorded Live, with special guests, 1987)
- 2009 A Time to Remember (Live)

=== Compilation albums ===
- 1967 The Best of The Dubliners (Transatlantic TRA 158)
- 1969 It's The Dubliners
- 1969 A Drop of The Dubliners
- 1976 Drinking and Wenching [1967–1969]
- 1977 Home, Boys, Home
- 1978 20 Original Greatest Hits
- 1979 The Dubliners Collection
- 1981 20 Original Greatest Hits Volume 2
- 1981 18 Original Greatest Hits Volume 3
- 1986 Luke's Legacy
- 1992 Off to Dublin Green
- 1993 Original Dubliners
- 1995 Milestones
- 1997 The Definitive Transatlantic Collection
- 1998 At Their Best
- 1998 Ageless Classics – The Transatlantic Years Revisited
- 2000 Collection (reassembling)
- 2000 Definitive Dubliners
- 2002 The Best of The Dubliners
- 2002 The Transatlantic Anthology
- 2003 Spirit of the Irish
- 2005 Wild Irish Rovers
- 2006 The Dubliners Collection (reassembling)
- 2006 Too Late to Stop Now: The Very Best of the Dubliners
- 2009 The Very Best Of: The Dubliners
- 2010 The Very Best of the Original Dubliners
- 2011 Wild Rover
- 2012 50 Years

=== Video ===
- 1984 The Dubliners – Visions of Ireland (re-released in 1991 as The Dubliners – Recorded Live in Dublin and in 1992 as The Dubliners – Live with Paddy Reilly and Jim McCann)
- 1989 The Dubliners Dublin
- 1987 The Late Late Show Tribute to The Dubliners
- 1998 O'Donoghue's Opera
- 1999 Luke – The Documentary
- 2002 40 Years: Live From The Gaiety (re-released in 2004 as The Dubliners – Live: Legends In Concert and as a DVD/CD set The Dubliners – Live)
- 2005 Five Beards on the Road (re-released in 2007 as On The Road – Live In Germany)
- 2005 Luke Kelly – The Performer
- 2005 The Dubliners Tour Sampler
- 2006 Live At Vicar Street
- 2008 The Dubliners – World Icons (2 DVD/CD Compilation)
- 2012 50 Years – Celebration Concert in Dublin

=== Irish Chart singles ===
- 1966 – "Nelson's Farewell" (No. 6)
- 1967 – "The Black Velvet Band" (No. 4)
- 1967 – All For Me Grog (No. 10)
- 1967 – "Seven Drunken Nights" (No. 1)
- 1968 – "Maids When You're Young Never Wed an Old Man" (No. 11)
- 1968 – "Dirty Old Town" (No. 10)
- 1971 – "Hand Me Down My Bible" (No. 7)
- 1971 – "Free the People" (No. 7)
- 1986 – "Raglan Road" (No. 30)
- 1987 – "Don't Get Married" (No. 24)
- 1987 – "The Irish Rover" (No. 1)
- 1990 – "Jack's Heroes" (No. 4) (with The Pogues)
- 1991 – "The Rose" (No. 2) (with Hothouse Flowers)
- 1994 – "Red Roses for Me" (No. 13)
- 2008 – "The Ballad of Ronnie Drew" (No. 1) (With U2)
- 2012 – "The Rocky Road to Poland" (No. 1 Ireland)(with Bressie and Damien Dempsey)
- 2013 – "The Auld Triangle (No. 80) (with Luke Kelly)

=== UK Chart singles ===
- 1967 – "Seven Drunken Nights" (No. 7)
- 1967 – "The Black Velvet Band" (No. 15)
- 1967 – "Maids When You're Young Never Wed an Old Man" (No. 43)
- 1987 – "Irish Rover" (Feat The Pogues) (No. 8)
- 1990 – "Jacks Heroes" (Feat The Pogues) (No. 63)
