= Paddy Reilly =

Irish folk singer

- Born: Patrick Reilly; 18 October 1939 (age 86); Rathcoole, County Dublin, Ireland
- Genres: Celtic; folk
- Occupations: Singer
- Years active: 1966–2005
- Label: Dolphin Records
- Formerly of: The Dubliners

Patrick Reilly (born 18 October 1939) is an Irish folk singer and guitarist. Born in Rathcoole, County Dublin, he is one of Ireland's most famous balladeers and is best known for his renditions of "The Fields of Athenry", "Rose of Allendale" and "The Town I Loved So Well". Reilly released his version of "The Fields of Athenry" as a single in 1983; it was the most successful version of this song, remaining in the Irish charts for 72 weeks. He achieved number 1 in Ireland with the Liam Reilly (no relation) written song "Flight of Earls" in 1988.

For years a solo performer, he joined The Dubliners in 1996 as a replacement for long-time member Ronnie Drew. He left the group after nine years to move to New York City (where he owns a number of pubs) in 2005 and was replaced by Patsy Watchorn. After living in New York for several years he moved back to Ireland.

== Discography ==
=== Solo albums ===
- The Life of Paddy Reilly (1971)
- Paddy Reilly at Home (1972)
- The Town I Loved So Well (1975)
- Green Shamrock Shore (1980)
- The Fields of Athenry (1982)
- Live Paddy Reilly (1983)
- The Old Refrain (1984)
- Greatest Hits Live (1985)
- Paddy Reilly's Ireland (1986)
- Paddy Reilly Now (1988)
- Sings the Songs of Ewan MacColl (1990)
- Gold and Silver Days (1991) Recorded and released on Irish record label Celtic Collections
- Come Back Paddy Reilly (2003)
- 32 Counties in Song (2003) Recorded and released on Irish record label Celtic Collections

=== With The Dubliners ===
- Further Along (1996)
- Alive Alive-O (1997)
- 40 Years (2002)
- Live from the Gaiety (2002)
