= Eamonn Campbell =

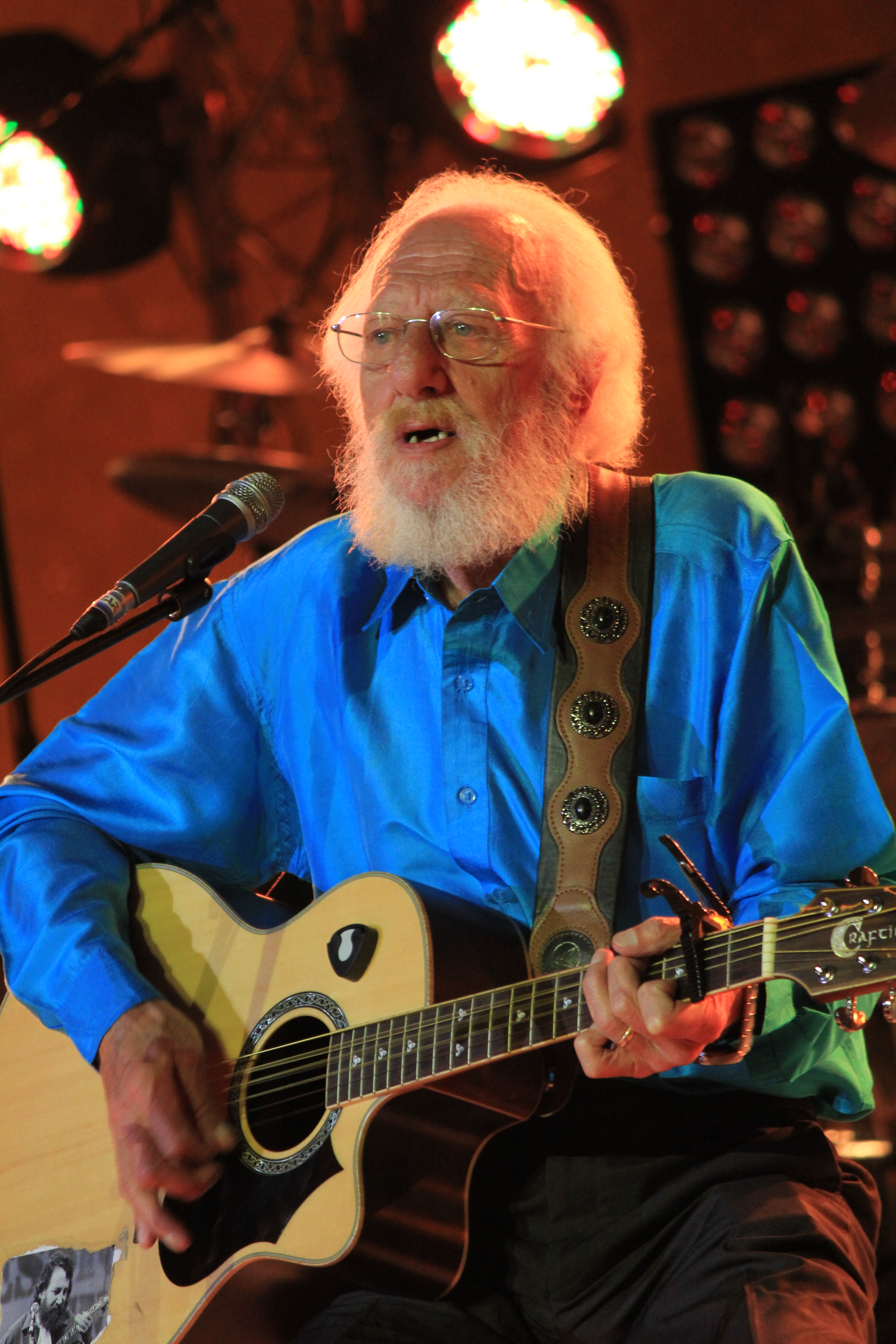
- Eamonn Campbell during the Festival Interceltique de Lorient in 2014

Background information
- Born: 29 November 1946; Drogheda, County Louth, Ireland
- Died: 18 October 2017 (aged 70) Ede, Netherlands
- Genres: Irish folk
- Occupations: Musician; record producer
- Instruments: Vocals; guitar; mandolin
- Years active: 1958–2017
- Formerly of: The Dubliners

Eamonn Campbell (29 November 1946 – 18 October 2017) was an Irish musician who was a member of The Dubliners from 1987 until his death. He was also in the Dubliners when they recorded their 25th anniversary show on The Late Late Show hosted by Gay Byrne. He was known as a guitarist and had a rough voice similar to the late Dubliner founding member Ronnie Drew. He toured with three other ex-Dubliners as "The Dublin Legends", after the group name was reitred due to the death of Barney McKenna. Campbell was originally from Drogheda in County Louth, but latterly lived in Walkinstown, a suburb of Dublin.

It was his suggestion that the Dubliners work with London-based Irish band The Pogues in the mid-1980s, thus giving them their second biggest UK hit to date ("The Irish Rover"); their biggest hit was Seven Drunken Nights which reached number 7 in the charts in 1967. and an appearance on Top of the Pops.

He produced all of the Dubliners' albums from 1987 onwards, as well as albums for many other Irish artists, including Foster and Allen, Brendan Shine, Daniel O'Donnell and Paddy Reilly. He played locally with the Delta Showband, The Bee Vee Five and the Country Gents before joining Dermot O'Brien and the Clubmen and first met The Dubliners when both acts toured England together in 1967. In the mid to late 1970s Eamonn more or less retired from the road and became involved in the growing Irish recording scene, first as a session musician and later moving to production.

In 2002, Campbell put a complaint to a Commission to Inquire into Sexual Abuse as he said he was abused by The Christian Brothers as a child. In an interview he said "I felt emotional with hate at what this arsehole had got away with. He was abusing the whole class. I still haven't heard anything back."

He was the Grand Master for the 2009 Drogheda St Patrick's Day Parade. In his younger years Campbell taught guitar lessons at the "Music Shop" in Drogheda. His granddaughter Megan Campbell is a Republic of Ireland international footballer.

Whilst on tour in the Netherlands with the Dublin Legends, Eamonn had been feeling unwell during his final performance. He returned to his hotel at around 1am and went to bed. Eamonn died in a Dutch hospital, during the early hours of the morning of 18 October 2017.

His body was flown back to Dublin where his funeral took place on 26 October 2017.
