= Barney McKenna =

Irish musician (1939–2012)

Background information
- Also known as: Banjo Barney
- Born: Bernard Noël McKenna; 16 December 1939; Donnycarney, Dublin, Ireland
- Origin: Dublin, Ireland
- Died: 5 April 2012 (aged 72) Howth, Dublin, Ireland
- Genre: Irish folk
- Occupation: Musician
- Instruments: Vocals; banjo; melodeon; mandolin; violin
- Years active: 1962–2012
- Formerly of: The Dubliners

Bernard Noël "Banjo Barney" McKenna (16 December 1939 – 5 April 2012) was an Irish musician and a founding member of The Dubliners. He played the tenor banjo, violin, mandolin, and melodeon. He was most renowned as a banjo player.

== Biography ==
Born in Donnycarney, Dublin, McKenna played the banjo from an early age, beginning because he could not afford to buy the instrument of his choice, a mandolin. He was a member of The Dubliners from 1962 and was the only living member of the original (1962) formation at the time of his death. Prior to joining the Dubliners, he had spent a few months in The Chieftains. In addition to his work on traditional Irish music, he also played jazz on occasion.

== Artistic performance ==
Barney used GDAE tuning on a 17-fret tenor banjo, an octave below fiddle/mandolin and, according to musician Mick Moloney, was single-handedly responsible for making the GDAE-tuned tenor banjo the standard banjo in Irish music.

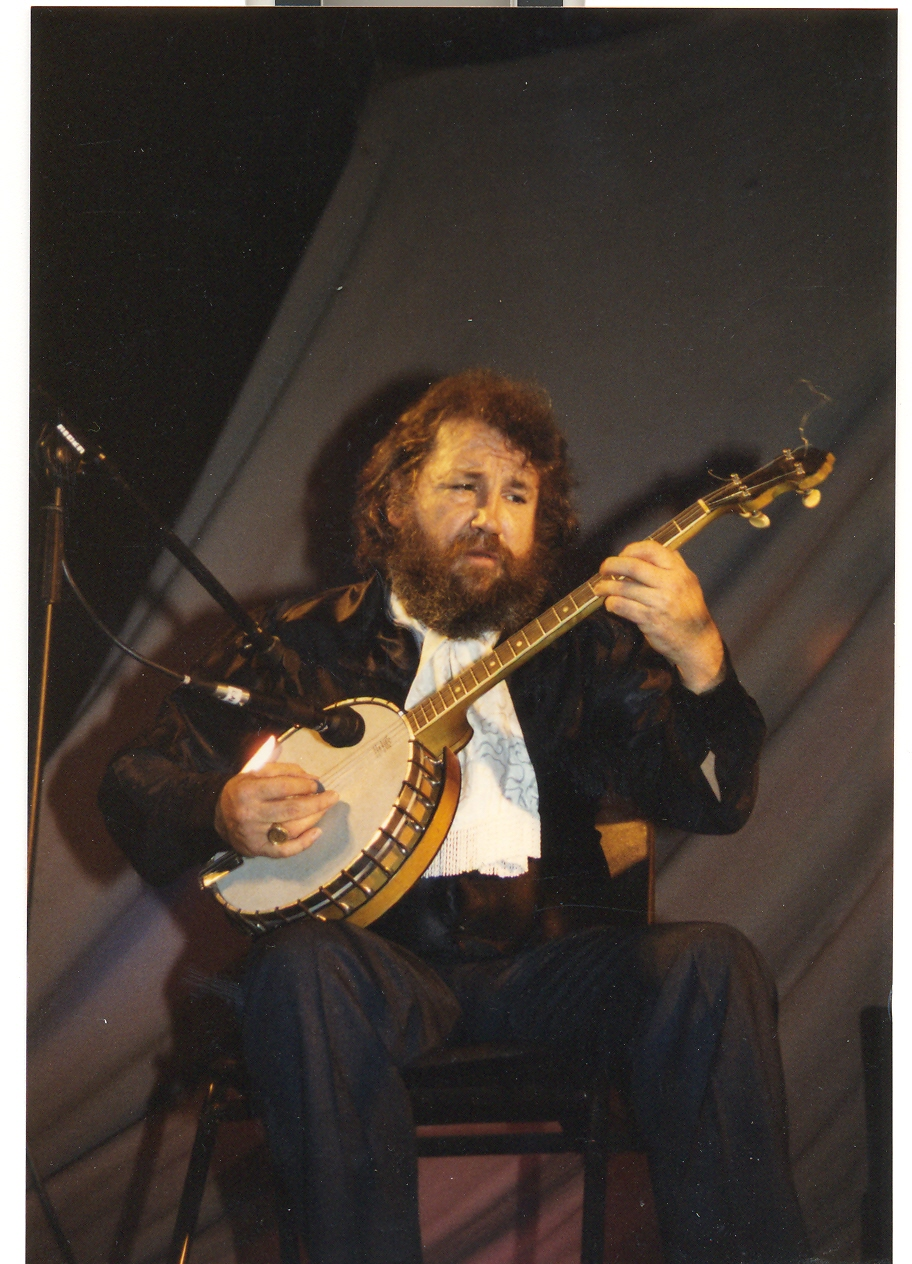
Barney McKenna

Barney remained a great favourite with live audiences, and some of the loudest and most affectionate applause followed the tunes and songs on which he was the featured performer. He was well known for his unaccompanied renditions of songs such as 'South Australia' and 'I Wish I Had Someone to Love Me'. His banjo solos on tunes such as 'The Maid Behind the Bar', 'The High Reel' and 'The Mason's Apron', where he was usually accompanied by Eamonn Campbell on guitar, were often performed to cries of "C'mon Barney!" from audience or band members. Another featured spot in Dubliners performances is the mandolin duet that Barney played with John Sheahan – again with Eamonn Campbell providing guitar accompaniment. As Barney often pointed out to the audience: "It's an Irish duet, so there's three of us going to play it".

Barney's tendency to relate funny, and often only marginally believable, stories was legendary amongst Dubliners fans and friends. These anecdotes became known as Barneyisms, and Barney's friend, and former Dubliners bandmate, Jim McCann collected them for the book "An Obstacle Confusion: The Wonderful World of Barney McKenna".

== Personal life ==
McKenna was a keen fisherman, and many of the songs he has recorded with The Dubliners have been shanties and nautical ballads.

In 1965, McKenna married Joka McKenna nee Oldert, who was Dutch.

In 1981, McKenna had an illegitimate son with Helen Aherne O' Brian--Daragh Aherne Clarke. Clarke moved into McKenna's home in 2013 after DNA tests proved he was McKenna's son. Clarke died unexpectedly in 2023.

In 2006, McKenna suffered a mild stroke, which caused him to lose his sight in one eye, and have difficulty walking.

McKenna is mentioned several times in the song 'O'Donoghue's' by Andy Irvine, which describes the Dublin traditional music scene of the early-to-mid 1960s that found a spiritual home in O'Donoghue's Pub in Dublin's Merrion Row.

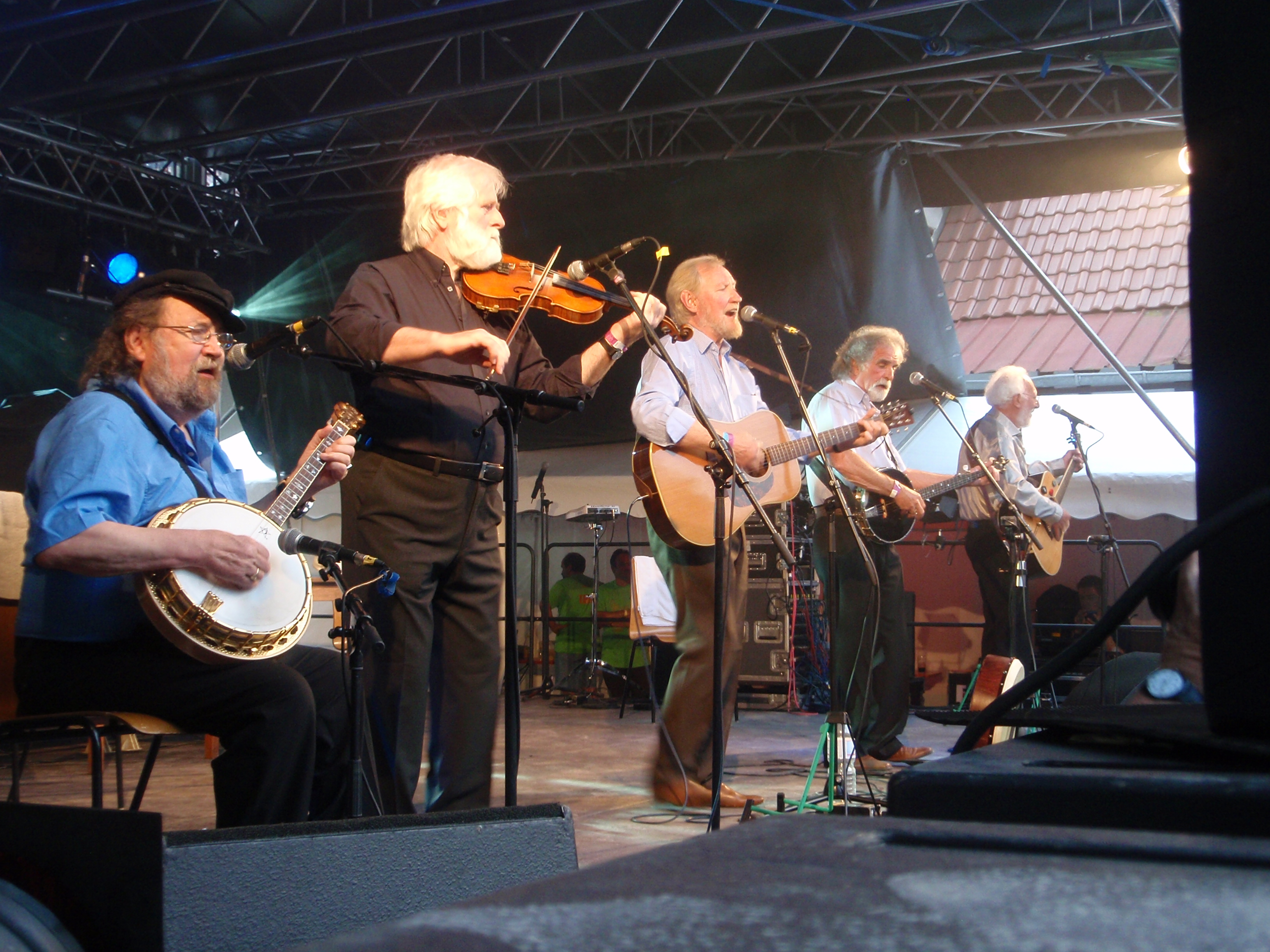
Barney McKenna performing with The Dubliners 2010 at a folk festival in Germany

== Death ==
McKenna died on the morning of 5 April 2012 after collapsing in the kitchen of his home in Howth, County Dublin. He was buried at St Loman's Cemetery in Trim, County Meath, on 9 April 2012. At first it was unclear whether The Dubliners would continue their 50th Anniversary Tour in the wake of McKenna's death. However they soon confirmed that they would "do their best to honour all the concert dates for the rest of the year [2012]".
