= Nelson's Pillar =

Former column and statue in Dublin, Ireland

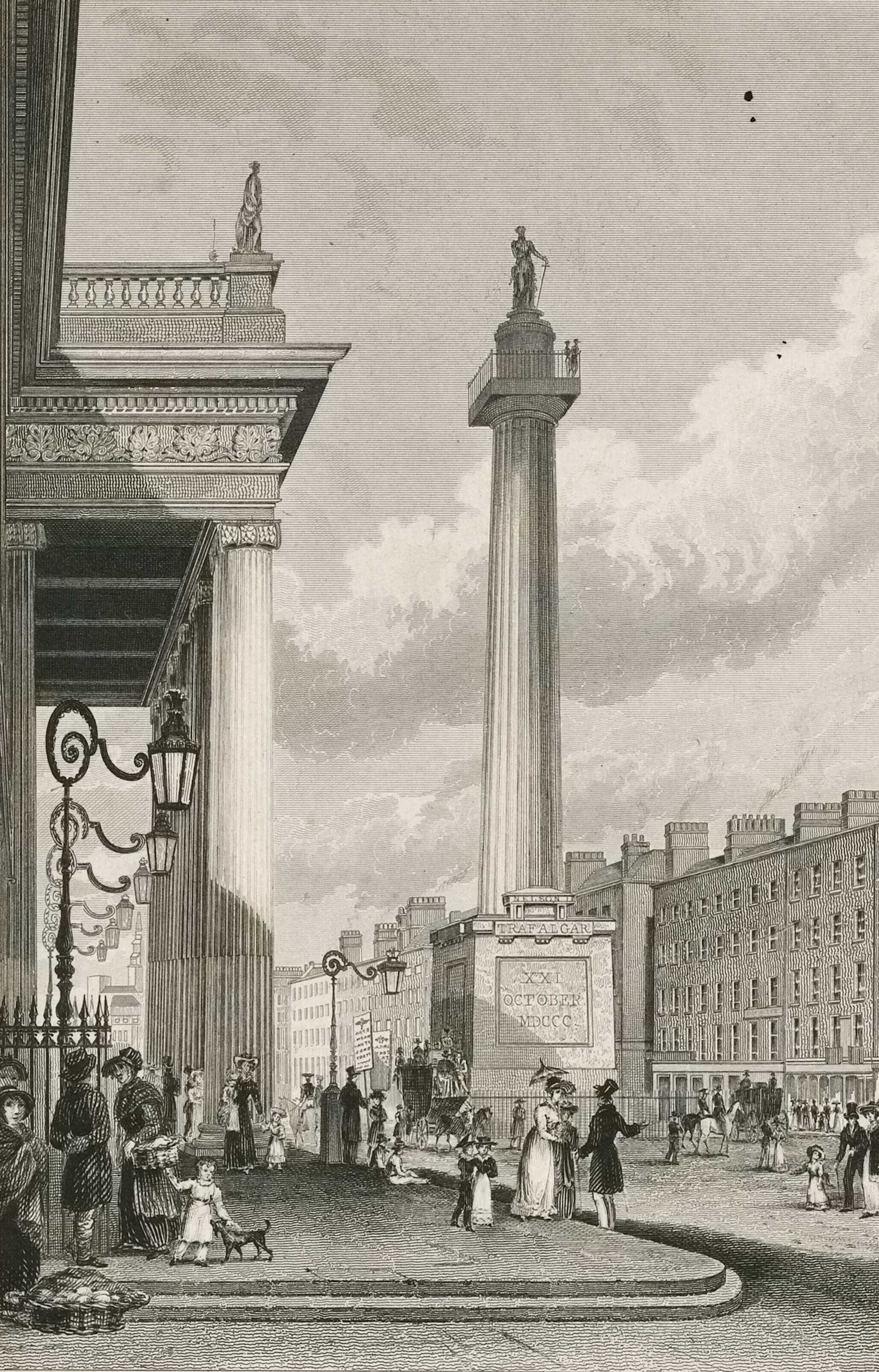
- Nelson's Pillar, c. 1830

- Location within Central Dublin
- Alternative names: The Nelson Pillar; The Pillar

General information
- Status: Destroyed
- Location: O'Connell Street; Dublin, Ireland
- Coordinates: 53°20′59.3″N 06°15′36.9″W
- Groundbreaking: 15 February 1808
- Opening: 21 October 1809; 217 years ago
- Destroyed: 8 and 14 March 1966
- Client: Dublin Corporation

Design and construction
- Architects: William Wilkins; Francis Johnston

Nelson's Pillar (also known as the Nelson Pillar or simply the Pillar) was a large granite column capped by a statue of Horatio Nelson, built in the centre of what was then Sackville Street (later renamed O'Connell Street) in Dublin, Ireland. Completed in 1809 when Ireland was part of the United Kingdom, it survived until March 1966, when it was severely damaged by explosives planted by Irish republicans. Its remnants were later destroyed by the Irish Army.

The decision to build the monument was taken by Dublin Corporation in the euphoria following Nelson's victory at the Battle of Trafalgar in 1805. The original design by William Wilkins was greatly modified by Francis Johnston, on grounds of cost. The statue was sculpted by Thomas Kirk. From its opening on 29 October 1809 the Pillar was a popular tourist attraction, but provoked aesthetic and political controversy from the outset. A prominent city centre monument honouring an Englishman rankled as Irish nationalist sentiment grew, and throughout the 19th century there were calls for it to be removed, or replaced with a memorial to an Irish hero.

It remained in the city as most of Ireland became the Irish Free State in 1922, and the Republic of Ireland in 1949. The chief legal barrier to its removal was the trust created at the Pillar's inception, the terms of which gave the trustees a duty in perpetuity to preserve the monument. Successive Irish governments failed to enact legislation overriding the trust. Although influential literary figures such as W. B. Yeats and Oliver St. John Gogarty defended the Pillar on historical and cultural grounds, pressure for its removal intensified in the years preceding the 50th anniversary of the Easter Rising, and its sudden demise was, on the whole, well received by the public. Although it was widely believed that the action was the work of the Irish Republican Army (IRA), the Garda Síochána were unable to identify any of those responsible.

After years of debate and numerous proposals, the site was occupied in 2003 by the Spire of Dublin, a slim needle-like structure rising almost three times the height of the Pillar. In 2000, a former republican activist gave a radio interview in which he admitted planting the explosives in 1966, but after questioning him the Gardaí decided not to take action. Relics of the Pillar are found in Dublin museums and appear as decorative stonework elsewhere and its memory is preserved in numerous works of Irish literature.

== Background ==
=== Sackville Street and Blakeney ===
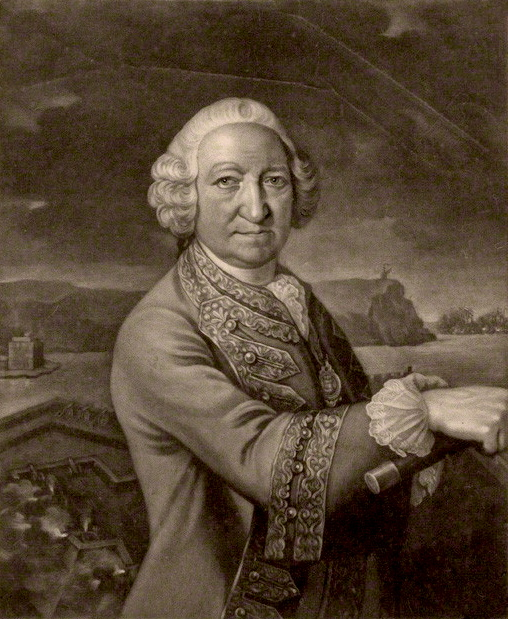
William Blakeney, whose Sackville Street statue preceded Nelson's

The redevelopment of Dublin north of the River Liffey began in the early 18th century, largely through the enterprise of the property speculator Luke Gardiner. His best-known work was the transformation in the 1740s of a narrow lane called Drogheda Street, which he demolished and turned into a broad thoroughfare lined with large and imposing town houses. He renamed it Sackville Street, in honour of Lionel Sackville, 1st Duke of Dorset, who served as Lord Lieutenant of Ireland from 1731 to 1737 and from 1751 to 1755. After Gardiner's death in 1755 Dublin's growth continued, with many fine public buildings and grand squares, the city's status magnified by the presence of the Parliament of Ireland for six months of the year. The Acts of Union of 1800, which united Ireland and Great Britain under a single Westminster polity, ended the Irish parliament and presaged a period of decline for the city. The historian Tristram Hunt writes: "[T]he capital's dynamism vanished, absenteeism returned and the big houses lost their patrons".

The first monument in Sackville Street was built in 1759 in the location where the Nelson Pillar would eventually stand. The subject was William Blakeney, 1st Baron Blakeney, a Limerick-born army officer whose career extended over more than 60 years and ended with his surrender to the French after the siege of Minorca in 1756. A brass statue sculpted by John van Nost the younger was unveiled on St Patrick's Day, 17 March 1759. (Note: Most unusually for the subject of a statue, Blakeney was still alive at the time—he died in September 1761.) Donal Fallon, in his history of the Pillar, states that almost from its inception the Blakeney statue was a target for vandalism. Its fate is uncertain; Fallon records that it might have been melted down for cannon, but it had certainly been removed by 1805.

=== Trafalgar ===
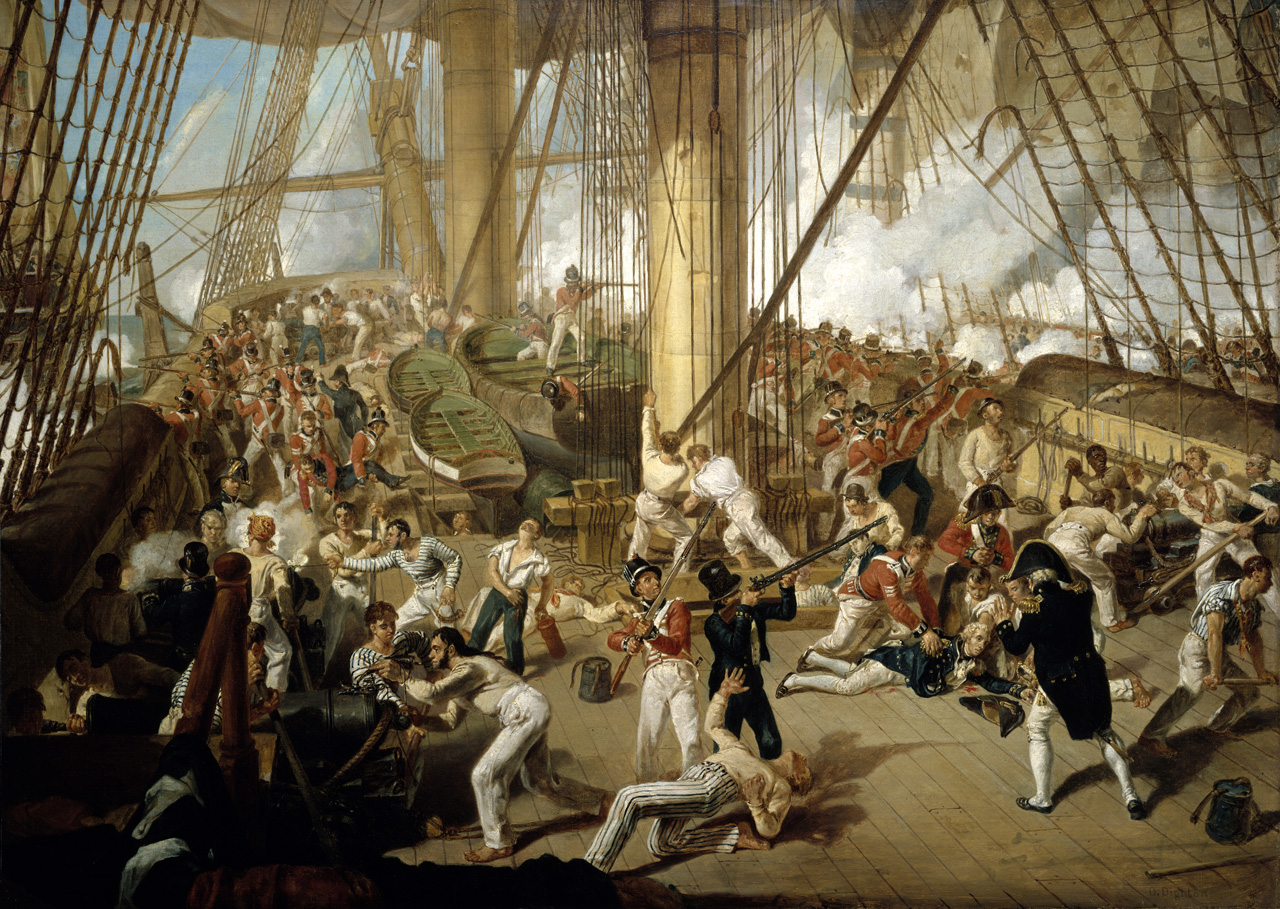
Nelson's death aboard HMS Victory. Painting by Denis Dighton, c. 1825

On 21 October 1805, a Royal Navy fleet commanded by Vice-Admiral Lord Nelson defeated a combined fleet of the French and Spanish navies at the Battle of Trafalgar. At the height of the battle Nelson was mortally wounded on board his flagship, HMS Victory; by the time he died later that day, victory was assured.

Nelson had been hailed in Dublin seven years earlier, after the Battle of the Nile, as defender of the Harp and Crown, the respective symbols of Ireland and Britain. When news of Trafalgar reached the city on 8 November, there were similar scenes of patriotic celebration, together with a desire that the fallen hero should be commemorated. The mercantile classes had particular reason to be grateful for a victory that restored the freedom of the high seas and removed the threat of a French invasion. Many of the city's population had relatives who had been involved in the battle: up to one-third of the sailors in Nelson's fleet were from Ireland, including around 400 from Dublin itself. In his short account of the Pillar, Dennis Campbell Kennedy considers that Nelson would have been regarded in the city as a hero, not just among the Protestant Ascendancy but by many Catholics among the rising middle and professional classes.

The first step towards a permanent memorial to Nelson was taken on 18 November 1805 by the city aldermen, who after sending a message of congratulation to King George III, agreed that the erection of a statue would form a suitable tribute to Nelson's memory. On 28 November, after a public meeting had supported this sentiment, a "Nelson committee" was established, chaired by the Lord Mayor. It contained four of the city's Westminster MPs, alongside other city notables including Arthur Guinness II, the son of the brewery founder. The committee's initial tasks were to decide precisely what form the monument should take and where it should be put. They had also to raise the funds to pay for it.

== Inception, design and construction ==
BY THE BLESSING OF ALMIGHTY GOD, To Commemorate the Transcendent Heroic Achievements of the Right Honourable HORATIO LORD VISCOUNT NELSON, Duke of Bronti in Sicily, Vice-Admiral of the White Squadron of His Majesty's Fleet, Who fell gloriously in the Battle off CAPE TRAFALGAR, on the 21st Day of October 1805; when he obtained for his Country a VICTORY over the COMBINED FLEET OF FRANCE AND SPAIN, unparalleled in Naval History. This first STONE of a Triumphal PILLAR was laid by HIS GRACE CHARLES DUKE OF RICHMOND and LENNOX, Lord Lieutenant General and General Governor of Ireland, on the 15th Day of February in the year of our Lord, 1808. and in the 48th Year of our most GRACIOUS SOVEREIGN GEORGE THE THIRD, in the presence of the Committee appointed by the Subscribers for erecting this monument.

— Wording of memorial plaque laid with the foundation stone, 15 February 1808

At its first meeting the Nelson committee established a public subscription, and early in 1806 invited artists and architects to submit design proposals for a monument. No specifications were provided, but the contemporary European vogue in commemorative architecture was for the classical form, typified by Trajan's Column in Rome. Monumental columns, or "pillars of victory", were uncommon in Ireland at the time; the Cumberland Column in Birr, County Offaly, erected in 1747, was a rare exception. From the entries submitted, the Nelson committee's choice was that of a young English architect, William Wilkins, then in the early stages of a distinguished career. (Note: In his later career Wilkins was responsible for the design of numerous major London buildings, including the National Gallery and University College London, and of a number of colleges of the University of Cambridge.) Wilkins's proposals envisaged a tall Doric column on a plinth, surmounted by a sculpted Roman galley.

The choice of the Sackville Street site was not unanimous. The Wide Streets Commissioners were worried about traffic congestion, and argued for a riverside location visible from the sea. Another suggestion was for a seaside position, perhaps Howth Head at the entrance to Dublin Bay. The recent presence of the Blakeney statue in Sackville Street, and a desire to arrest the street's decline in the post-parliamentary years, were factors that may have influenced the final selection of that site which, Kennedy says, was the preferred choice of the Lord Lieutenant.

By mid-1807, fundraising was proving difficult; sums raised at that point were well short of the likely cost of erecting Wilkins's column. The committee informed the architect with regret that "means were not placed in their hands to enable them to gratify him, as well as themselves, by executing his design precisely as he had given it". They employed Francis Johnston, architect to the City Board of Works, to make cost-cutting adjustments to Wilkins's scheme. (Note: Johnston's later Dublin commissions included the General Post Office and additions to the Vice-regal Lodge.) Johnston simplified the design, substituting a large functional block or pedestal for Wilkins's delicate plinth, and replacing the proposed galley with a statue of Nelson. Thomas Kirk, a sculptor from Cork, was commissioned to provide the statue, to be fashioned from Portland stone.

By December 1807 the fund stood at £3,827, far short of the estimated £6,500 required to finance the project. (Note: £6,500 in 1805 equates to about £500,000 in 2016, using the GDP deflator for capital projects.)

=== Foundation stone ===
Nevertheless, by the beginning of 1808 the committee felt confident enough to begin the work, and organised the laying of the foundation stone. This ceremony took place on 15 February 1808—the day following the anniversary of Nelson's victory at the Battle of Cape St Vincent in 1797, in the presence of the new Lord Lieutenant, the Duke of Richmond. A memorial plaque eulogising Nelson's Trafalgar victory was attached to the stone. The committee continued to raise money as construction proceeded; when the project was complete in the autumn of 1809, costs totalled £6,856, but contributions had reached £7,138, providing the committee with a surplus of £282.

When finished, the monument complete with its statue rose to a height of 134 feet (40.8 m). (Note: The recorded heights (rounded) of the various components were: pedestal 30 ft 1 in.; column and capital 78 ft 3 in.; epistilion (the base for the statue) 12 ft 6 in.; statue 13 ft; total 134 ft 3 in.) The four sides of the pedestal were engraved with the names and dates of Nelson's greatest victories. (Note: The inscriptions on each side were as follows: "ST. VINCENT XIV FEBRUARY MDCCXCVII" (west); "THE NILE I AUGUST MDCCXCVIII" (north); "COPENHAGEN II APRIL MDCCCI" (east); "TRAFALGAR XXI OCTOBER MDCCCV" (south). These refer to the following battles and their dates: Battle of Cape St Vincent (14 February 1797); Battle of the Nile (1–3 August 1798); Battle of Copenhagen (2 April 1801); and Battle of Trafalgar (21 October 1805).) A spiral stairway of 168 steps ascended the hollow interior of the column, to a viewing platform immediately beneath the statue. According to the committee's published report, 22,090 cubic feet (626 m^{3}) of black limestone, and 7,310 cubic feet (207 m^{3}) of granite had been used to build the column and its pedestal. The granite was sourced from Golden Hill quarry in County Wicklow.

=== Opening ===
The Pillar opened to the public on 21 October 1809, on the fourth anniversary of the Battle of Trafalgar; for ten pre-decimal pence, (Note: 10 pre-decimal pence in 1809 equates to £2.70 in 2016, based on retail price index.) visitors could climb to the viewing platform, and enjoy what an early report describes as "a superb panoramic view of the city, the country and the fine bay". (Note: At almost the same time as the Dublin pillar was being completed, the city of Montreal in Canada erected a column and statue of Nelson. Although largely French-speaking, the inhabitants of Montreal detested the French Revolution and Napoleon and regarded Nelson as a hero. In more recent times the Montreal monument has survived attempts by Quebec separatists to have it removed.)

Art historian Paula Murphy wrote of the stark visual impact of the column in an article entitled The Politics of the Street Monument:

Victorious campaigners achieved virtual deification when Viscount Nelson was placed on a triumphal column in the centre of Sackville Street in the heart of the city and when in 1808, the Duke of Wellington was commemorated by a gigantic obelisk in the Phoenix Park. Both monuments, rising to a soaring height and visible from some considerable distance, employed scale in an aggressive manner. The Nelson monument was controversial from the start. Political, artistic and situational objections were raised, and several Corporation Bills were introduced requesting its removal.

== History 1809–1966 ==
=== 1809–1916 ===
The Pillar quickly became a popular tourist attraction; Kennedy writes that "for the next 157 years its ascent was a must on every visitor's list". Yet from the beginning there were criticisms, on both political and aesthetic grounds. The September 1809 issue of the Irish Monthly Magazine, edited by the revolution-minded Walter "Watty" Cox, reported that "our independence has been wrested from us, not by the arms of France but by the gold of England. The statue of Nelson records the glory of a mistress and the transformation of our senate into a discount office". In an early (1818) history of the city of Dublin, the writers express awe at the scale of the monument, but are critical of several of its features: its proportions are described as "ponderous", the pedestal as "unsightly" and the column itself as "clumsy". However, Walker's Hibernian Magazine thought the statue was a good likeness of its subject, and that the Pillar's position in the centre of the wide street gave the eye a focal point in what was otherwise "wastes of pavements".

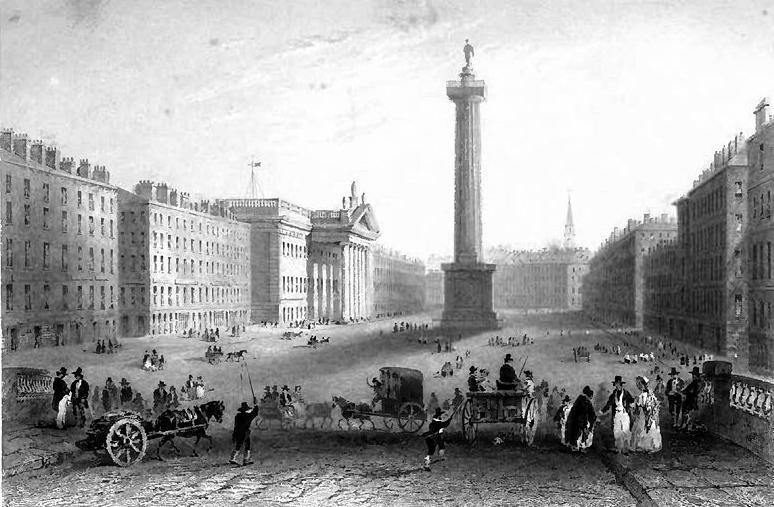
Lower Sackville Street and the Pillar depicted by William Henry Bartlett in the early 1840s, around the time of Thackeray's visit

By 1830, rising nationalist sentiment in Ireland made it likely that the Pillar was "the Ascendancy's last hurrah"—Kennedy observes that it probably could not have been built at any later date. Nevertheless, the monument often attracted favourable comment from visitors; in 1842 the writer William Makepeace Thackeray noted Nelson "upon a stone-pillar" in the middle of the "exceedingly broad and handsome" Sackville Street: "The Post Office is on his right hand (only it is cut off); and on his left, 'Gresham's' and the 'Imperial Hotel' ". A few years later, the monument was a source of pride to some citizens, who dubbed it "Dublin's Glory" when Queen Victoria visited the city in 1849.

Between 1840 and 1843, Nelson's Column was erected in London's Trafalgar Square. With an overall height of 170 feet (52 m) it was taller than its Dublin equivalent and, at £47,000, much more costly to erect, (Note: £47,000 in 1843 equates to about £5.3 million in 2016, using the GDP deflator for capital projects.) despite the absence of an internal staircase or viewing platform. The London column was the subject of an attack during the Fenian dynamite campaign in May 1884, when a quantity of explosives was placed at its base but failed to detonate.

In 1853, the queen attended the Dublin Great Industrial Exhibition, where a city plan was displayed that envisaged the removal of the Pillar. This proved impossible, as since 1811 legal responsibility for the Pillar had been vested in a trust, under the terms of which the trustees were required "to embellish and uphold the monument in perpetuation of the object for which it was subscribed". Any action to remove or resite the Pillar, or replace the statue, required the passage of an Act of Parliament in London; Dublin Corporation (the city government) had no authority in the matter. No action followed the city plan suggestion, but the following years saw regular attempts to remove the monument. A proposal was made in 1876 by Alderman Peter McSwiney, a former Lord Mayor, to replace the "unsightly structure" with a memorial to the recently deceased Sir John Gray, who had done much to provide Dublin with a clean water supply. The corporation was unable to advance this idea.

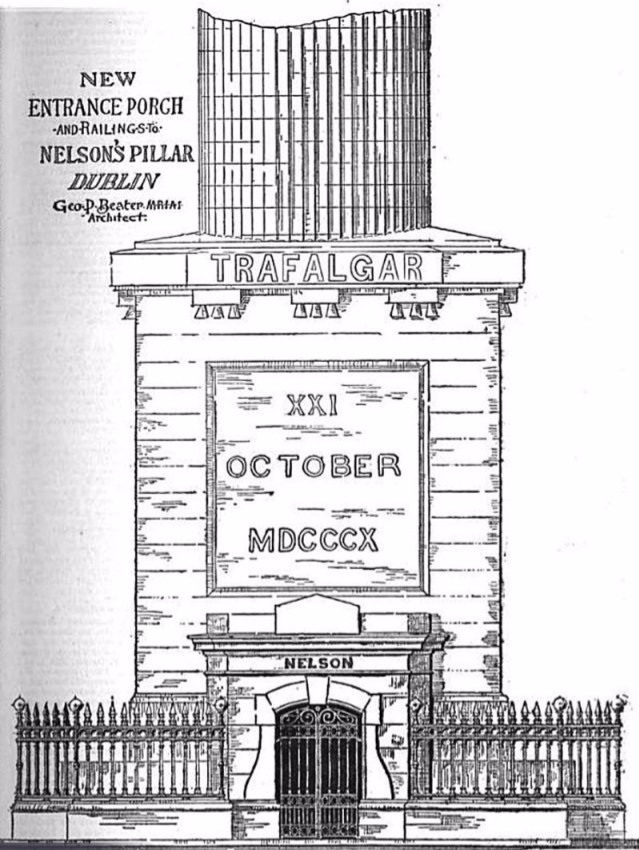
Design for the new 1894 entrance porch

In 1882, the Moore Street Market and Dublin City Improvement Act was passed by the Westminster parliament, overriding the trust and giving the Corporation authority to resite the Pillar, but subject to a strict timetable, within which the city authorities found it impossible to act. The Act lapsed and the Pillar remained; a similar attempt, with the same result, was made in 1891. Not all Dubliners favoured demolition; some businesses considered the Pillar to be the city's focal point, and the tramway company petitioned for its retention as it marked the central tram terminus. "In many ways", says Fallon, "the pillar had become part of the fabric of the city". Kennedy writes: "A familiar and very large if rather scruffy piece of the city's furniture, it was The Pillar, Dublin's Pillar rather than Nelson's Pillar ... it was also an outing, an experience". The Dublin sculptor John Hughes invited students at the Metropolitan School of Art to "admire the elegance and dignity" of Kirk's statue, "and the beauty of the silhouette".

An 1890 tourist guidebook to Dublin by M. J. B. Baddeley described the monument thus: "Just beyond it is the Nelson Pillar, 134 ft. high, including the statue. It can be ascended (charge 6d.), and from the gallery the whole of Dublin is in sight. The Pillar is the chief tramway focus."

In 1894, there were some significant alterations to the Pillar's fabric. The original entry on the west side, whereby visitors entered the pedestal by a flight of steps taking them down below street level, was replaced by a new ground level entrance on the south side, with a grand porch. The whole monument was surrounded by heavy iron railings. (Note: These changes were made by Dublin architect George Palmer Beater (1850–1928). The porch, with Nelson's name over the entrance, was made from "chiselled granite lined internally with white enamelled brick". Gilding was added to the incised inscriptions on the pedestal and to Nelson's name.) In the new century, despite the growing nationalism within Dublin—80 per cent of the corporation's councillors were nationalists of some description—the pillar was liberally decorated with flags and streamers to mark the 1905 Trafalgar centenary. The changing political atmosphere had long been signalled by the arrival in Sackville Street of further monuments, all celebrating distinctively Irish heroes, in what the historian Yvonne Whelan describes as defiance of the British Government, a "challenge in stone". Between the 1860s and 1911, Nelson was joined by monuments to Daniel O'Connell (the O'Connell Monument), William Smith O'Brien and Charles Stewart Parnell, as well as Sir John Gray and the temperance campaigner Father Mathew. Meanwhile, in 1861, after decades of construction, the Wellington Monument in Dublin's Phoenix Park was completed, the foundation stone having been laid in 1817. This vast obelisk, 220 feet (67 m) high and 120 feet (37 m) square at the base, honoured Arthur Wellesley, 1st Duke of Wellington, Dublin-born and a former Chief Secretary for Ireland. Unlike the Pillar, Wellington's obelisk has attracted little controversy and has not been the subject of physical attacks.

=== Easter Rising, April 1916 ===
On Easter Monday, 24 April 1916, units of the Irish Volunteers and the Irish Citizen Army seized several prominent buildings and streets in central Dublin, including the General Post Office (GPO) in Sackville Street, one of the buildings nearest the Pillar. They set up headquarters at the GPO where they declared an Irish Republic under a provisional government. One of the first recorded actions of the Easter Rising occurred near the Pillar when lancers from the nearby Marlborough Street barracks, sent to investigate the disturbance, were fired on from the GPO. They withdrew in confusion, leaving four soldiers and two horses dead.

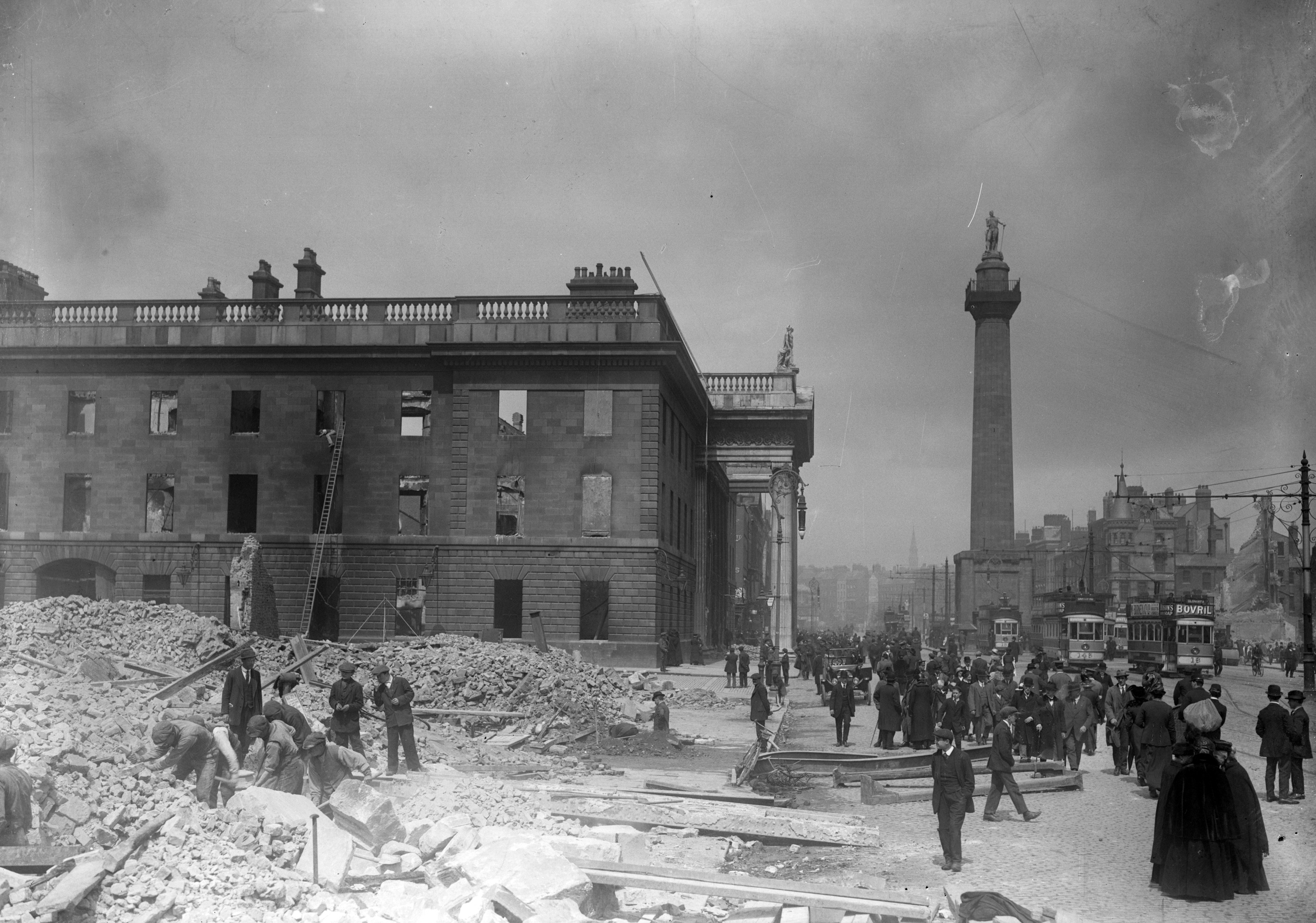
Sackville Street after the Easter Rising, showing the burnt out shell of the General Post Office and the intact Pillar in the background

During the days that followed, Sackville Street and particularly the area around the Pillar became a battleground. According to some histories, insurgents attempted to blow up the Pillar. The accounts are unconfirmed and were disputed by many that fought in the Rising, on the grounds that the Pillar's large base provided them with useful cover as they moved to and from other rebel positions. By Thursday night, British artillery fire had set much of Sackville Street ablaze, but according to the writer Peter De Rosa's account: "On his pillar, Nelson surveyed it all serenely, as though he were lit up by a thousand lamps". The statue was visible against the fiery backdrop from as far as Killiney, 9 miles (14 km) away.

By Saturday, when the provisional government finally surrendered, many of the Sackville Street buildings between the Pillar and the Liffey had been destroyed or badly damaged, including the Imperial Hotel that Thackeray had admired. Of the GPO, only the façade remained; against the tide of opinion Bernard Shaw said the demolition of the city's classical architecture scarcely mattered: "What does matter is the Liffey slums have not been demolished". An account in a New York newspaper reported that the Pillar had been lost in the destruction of the street, but it had sustained only minor damage, chiefly bullet marks on the column and statue itself—one shot is said to have taken off Nelson's nose.

=== Post-partition ===
After the Irish war of Independence 1919–21 and the treaty that followed, Ireland was partitioned; Dublin became the capital of the Irish Free State, a Dominion within the British Commonwealth of Nations. From December 1922, when the Free State was inaugurated, the Pillar became an issue for the Irish rather than the British government. In 1923, when Sackville Street was again in ruins during the Irish Civil War, The Irish Builder and Engineer magazine called the original siting of the Pillar a "blunder" and asked for its removal, a view echoed by the Dublin Citizens Association. The poet William Butler Yeats, who had become a member of the Irish Senate, favoured its re-erection elsewhere, but thought it should not, as some wished, be destroyed, because "the life and work of the people who built it are part of our tradition."

Sackville Street was renamed O'Connell Street in 1924. (Note: The change had first been proposed by Dublin Corporation in 1884, but had been rejected at the time by the street's residents.) The following year the Dublin Metropolitan Police and the Dublin Civic Survey demanded legislation to allow the Pillar's removal, without success. Pressure continued, and in 1926 The Manchester Guardian reported that the Pillar was to be taken down, "as it was a hindrance to modern traffic". Requests for action—removal, destruction or the replacement of the statue with that of an Irish hero—continued up to the Second World War and beyond; the main stumbling blocks remained the trustees' strict interpretation of the terms of the trust, and the unwillingness of successive Irish governments to take legislative action. In 1936 the magazine of the ultra-nationalist Blueshirts movement remarked that this inactivity showed a failure in the national spirit: "The conqueror is gone, but the scars which he left remain, and the victim will not even try to remove them".

Man and boy I have lived in Dublin, on and off, for 68 years. When I was a young fellow we didn't talk about Nelson's Column or Nelson's Pillar, we spoke of the Pillar, and everyone knew what we meant[.]

— Thomas Bodkin, 1955

By 1949, the Irish Free State had evolved into the Republic of Ireland and left the British Commonwealth, but not all Irish opinion favoured the removal of the Pillar. That year the architectural historian John Harvey called it "a grand work", and argued that without it, "O'Connell Street would lose much of its vitality". Most of the pressure to get rid of it, he said, came from "traffic maniacs who ... fail to visualise the chaos which would result from creating a through current of traffic at this point". In a 1955 radio broadcast Thomas Bodkin, former director of the National Gallery of Ireland, praised not only the monument, but Nelson himself: "He was a man of extraordinary gallantry. He lost his eye fighting bravely, and his arm in a similar fashion".

On 29 October 1955, a group of nine students from University College Dublin obtained keys from the Pillar's custodian and locked themselves inside, with an assortment of equipment including flame throwers. From the gallery they hung a poster of Kevin Barry, a Dublin Irish Republican Army (IRA) volunteer executed by the British during the War of Independence. A crowd gathered below, and began to sing the Irish rebel song "Kevin Barry". Eventually members of the Gardaí broke into the Pillar and ended the demonstration. No action was taken against the students, whose principal purpose, the Gardaí claimed, was publicity.

In 1956, members of the Fianna Fáil party, then in opposition, proposed that the statue be replaced by one of Robert Emmet, Protestant leader of an abortive rebellion in 1803. They thought that such a gesture might inspire Protestants in Northern Ireland to fight for a reunited Ireland. In the North the possibility of dismantling and re-erecting the monument in Belfast was raised in the Stormont parliament, but the initiative failed to gain the support of the Northern Ireland government.

In 1959, a new Fianna Fáil government under Seán Lemass deferred the question of the Pillar's removal on the grounds of cost; five years later Lemass agreed to "look at" the question of replacing Nelson's statue with one of Patrick Pearse, the leader of the Easter Rising, in time for the 50th anniversary of the Rising in 1966. An offer from the Irish-born American trade union leader Mike Quill to finance the removal of the Pillar was not taken up, and as the anniversary approached, Nelson remained in place.

== Destruction ==
There was an air of inevitability about Horatio Nelson's eventual demise; King William of Orange, King George II and Viscount Gough in the Phoenix Park had all fallen victim to republican bombings, while Queen Victoria had been rather unceremoniously dumped from her vantage point in Leinster House, removed on her back through the front gates.

— Donal Fallon: "Dispelling the myths about the bombing of Nelson's Pillar"

On 8 March 1966, a powerful explosion destroyed the upper portion of the Pillar and brought Nelson's statue crashing to the ground amid hundreds of tons of rubble. O'Connell Street was almost deserted at the time, although a dance in the nearby Hotel Metropole's ballroom was about to end and brought crowds on to the street. There were no casualties—a taxi driver parked close by had a narrow escape—and damage to property was relatively light given the strength of the blast. What was left of the Pillar was a jagged stump, 70 feet (21 m) high.

In the first government response to the action, the Justice minister, Brian Lenihan, condemned what he described as "an outrage which was planned and committed without any regard to the lives of the citizens". This response was considered "tepid" by The Irish Times, whose editorial deemed the attack "a direct blow to the prestige of the state and the authority of the government". Kennedy suggests that government anger was mainly directed at what they considered a distraction from the official 50th anniversary celebrations of the Rising.

The absence of the pillar was regretted by some who felt the city had lost one of its most prominent landmarks. The Irish Literary Association was anxious that, whatever future steps were taken, the lettering on the pedestal should be preserved; The Irish Times reported that the Royal Irish Academy of Music was considering legal measures to prevent removal of the remaining stump. Reactions among the general public were relatively light-hearted, typified by the numerous songs inspired by the incident. These included the immensely popular "Up Went Nelson", set to the tune of "John Brown's Body" and performed by a group of Belfast schoolteachers. An American newspaper reported that the mood in the city was one of gaiety, with shouts of "Nelson has lost his last battle!" Some accounts relate that the Irish president, Éamon de Valera, phoned The Irish Press to suggest the headline: "British Admiral Leaves Dublin By Air".

The Pillar's fate was sealed when Dublin Corporation issued a "dangerous building" notice. The trustees agreed that the stump should be removed. A last-minute request by the Royal Institute of the Architects of Ireland for an injunction to delay the demolition on planning grounds was rejected by Justice Thomas Teevan. On 14 March the Army destroyed the stump by a controlled explosion, watched at a safe distance by a crowd who, the press reported, "raised a resounding cheer". There was a scramble for souvenirs, and many parts of the stonework were taken from the scene. Some of these relics, including Nelson's head, eventually found their way into museums; (Note: About ten days after the initial explosion Nelson's head was stolen from a corporation yard by students from the National College of Art and Design, as a fund-raising stunt. The head was exhibited, for a fee, at various locations including stage performance by The Dubliners and The Clancy Brothers. It crossed the Irish Sea, and was rented for display in a London antique shop. It was returned to Ireland in September 1966, ultimately finding a home in the Dublin City Library and Archive in Pearse Street.) parts of the lettered stonework from the pedestal are displayed in the grounds of the Butler House hotel in Kilkenny, while smaller remnants were used to decorate private gardens. Contemporary and subsequent accounts record that the army's explosion caused more damage than the first, but this, Fallon says, is a myth; damage claims arising from the second explosion amounted to less than a quarter of the sum claimed as a result of the original blast.

The pillar on the morning of 8 March 1966

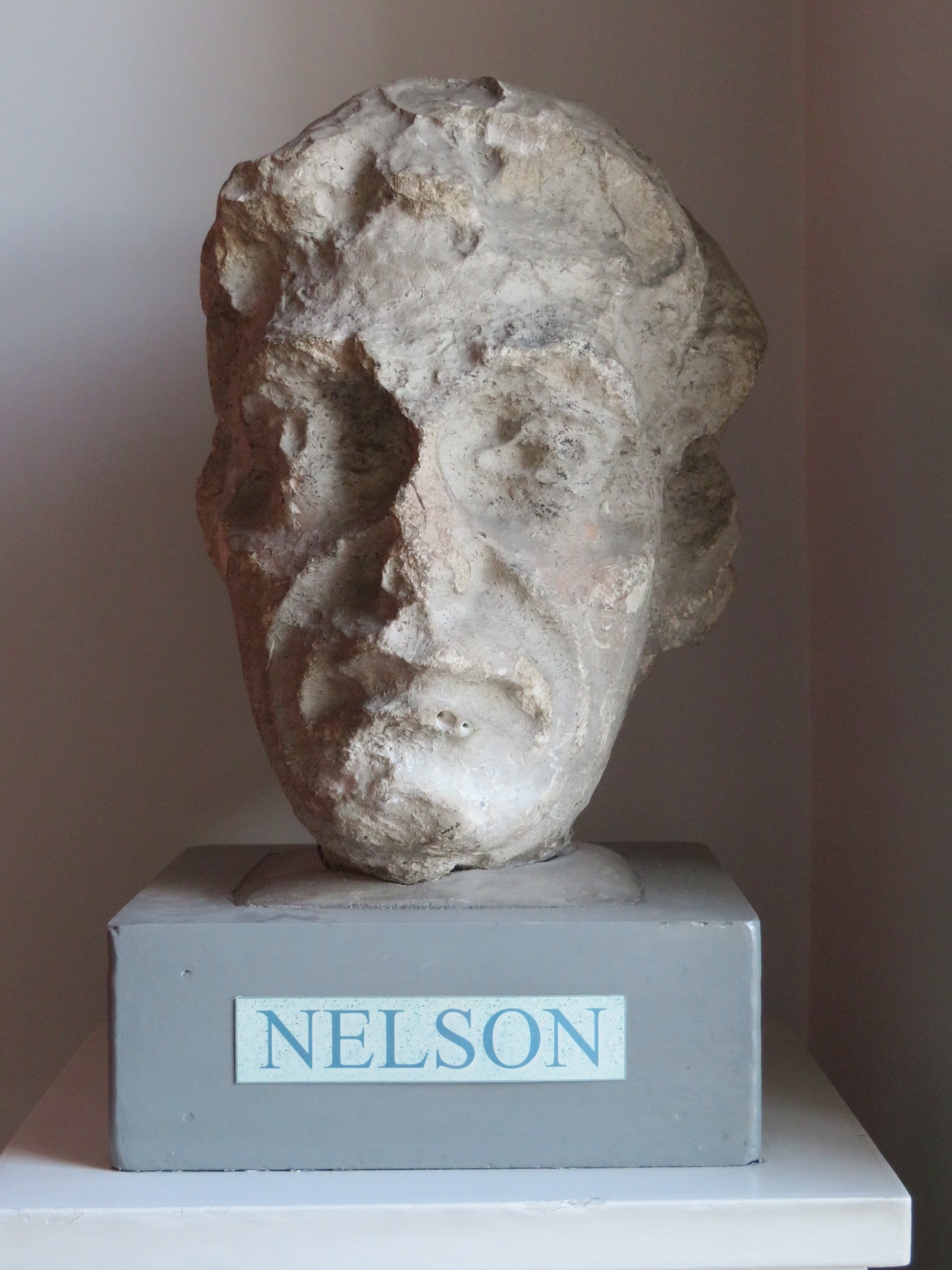
Horatio Nelson's head, from the statue destroyed in the explosion, displayed in the Dublin City Library on Pearse Street

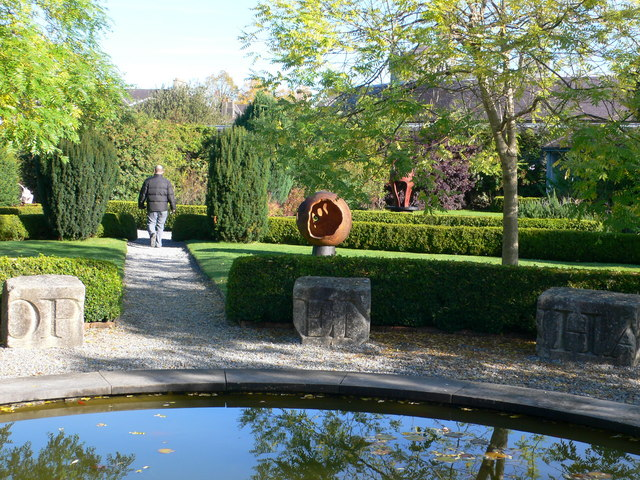
Lettering from Nelson's Pillar in the Butler House Walled Garden in 2009

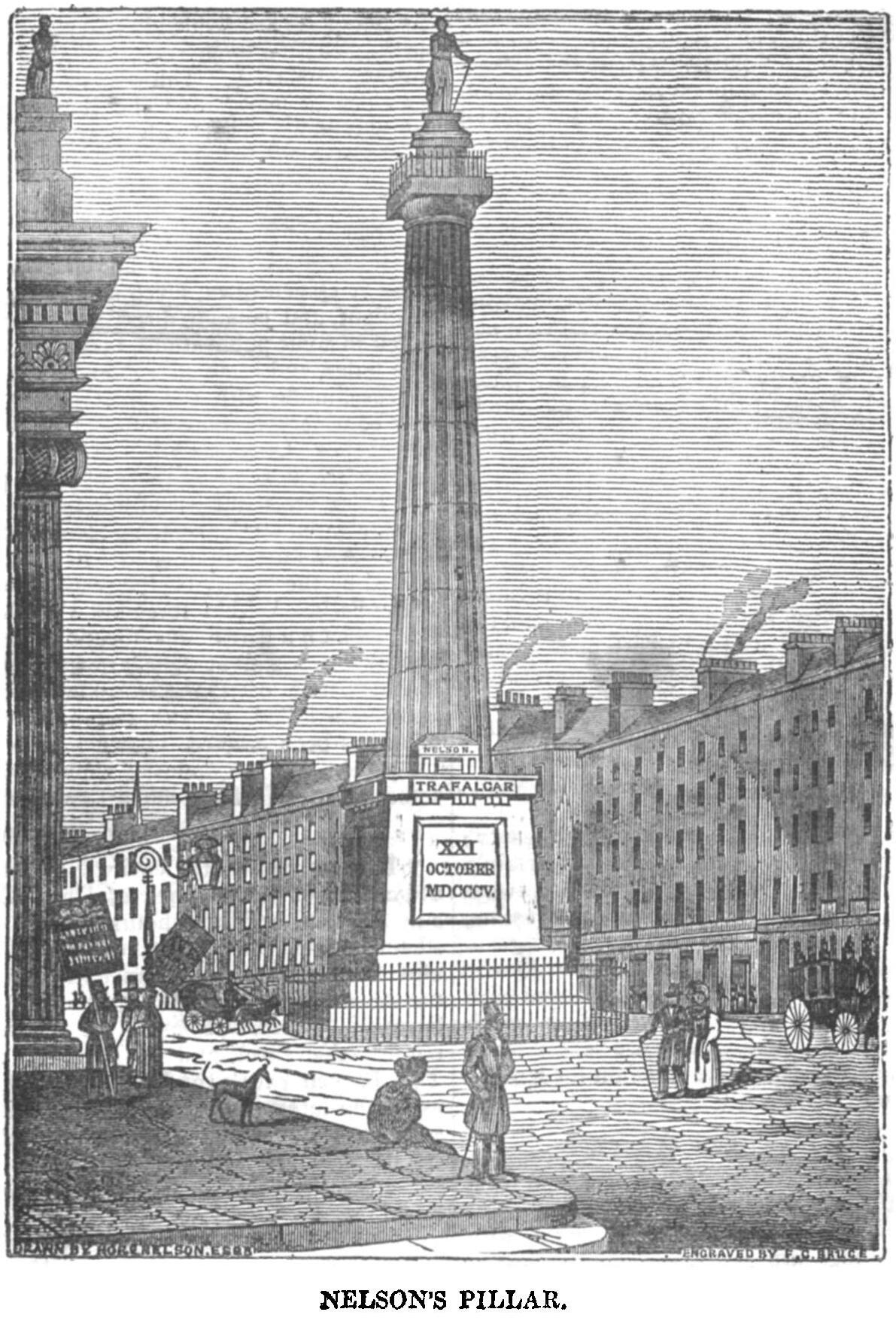
An engraving, after a sketch by Horation Nelson, a Dublin miniature painter, for the Dublin Penny Journal, 1835

== Aftermath ==
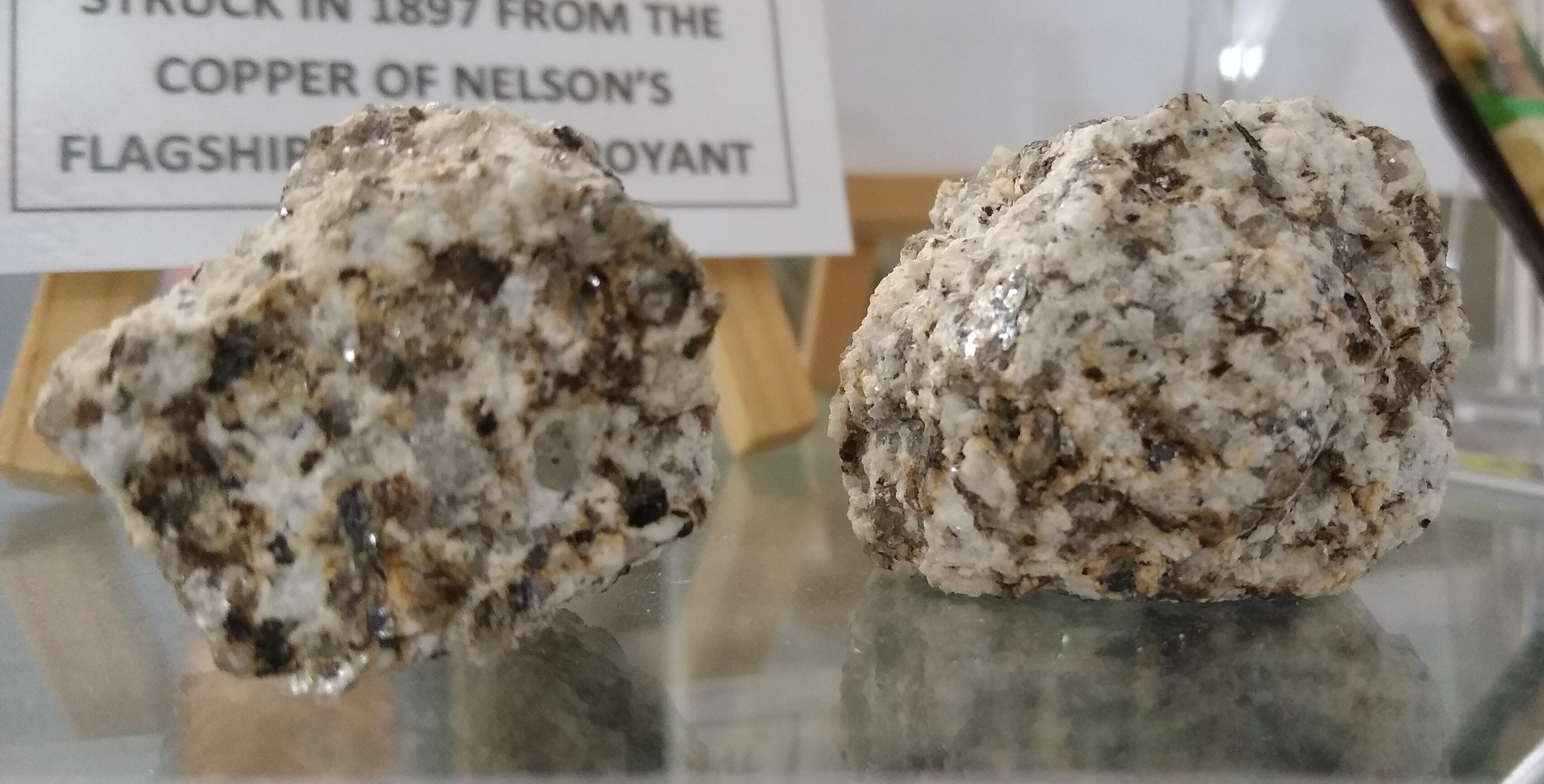
Rubble from the pillar, on display at the Irish Republican History Museum in Belfast

=== Investigations ===
It was initially assumed that the monument was destroyed by the IRA. The Guardian reported on 9 March that six men had been arrested and questioned, but their identities were not revealed and there were no charges. An IRA spokesman denied involvement, stating that they had no interest in demolishing mere symbols of foreign domination: "We are interested in the destruction of the domination itself". In the absence of any leads, rumours suggested that the Basque separatist movement ETA might be responsible, perhaps as part of a training exercise with an Irish republican splinter group; in the mid-1960s the explosives expertise of ETA was generally acknowledged.

No further information was forthcoming until 2000, when during a Raidió Teilifís Éireann interview a former IRA member, Liam Sutcliffe, claimed he had placed the bomb which detonated in the Pillar. In the 1950s Sutcliffe was associated with a group of dissident volunteers led by Rás Tailteann founder Joe Christle (1927–1998), who had been expelled from the IRA in 1956 for "recklessness". In early 1966 Sutcliffe learned that Christle's group was planning "Operation Humpty Dumpty", an attack on the Pillar, and offered his services. According to Sutcliffe, on 28 February he placed a bomb within the Pillar, timed to go off in the early hours of the next morning. The explosive was a mixture of gelignite and ammonal. It failed to detonate; Sutcliffe says that he returned early the next morning, recovered the device and redesigned its timer. On 7 March, shortly before the Pillar closed for the day, he climbed the inner stairway and placed the refurbished bomb near to the top of the shaft before going home. He learned of the success of his mission the next day, he says, having slept undisturbed through the night. Following his revelations, Sutcliffe was questioned by the Garda Síochána but not charged. He did not name others involved in the action, apart from Christle and his brother, Mick.

=== Replacements ===
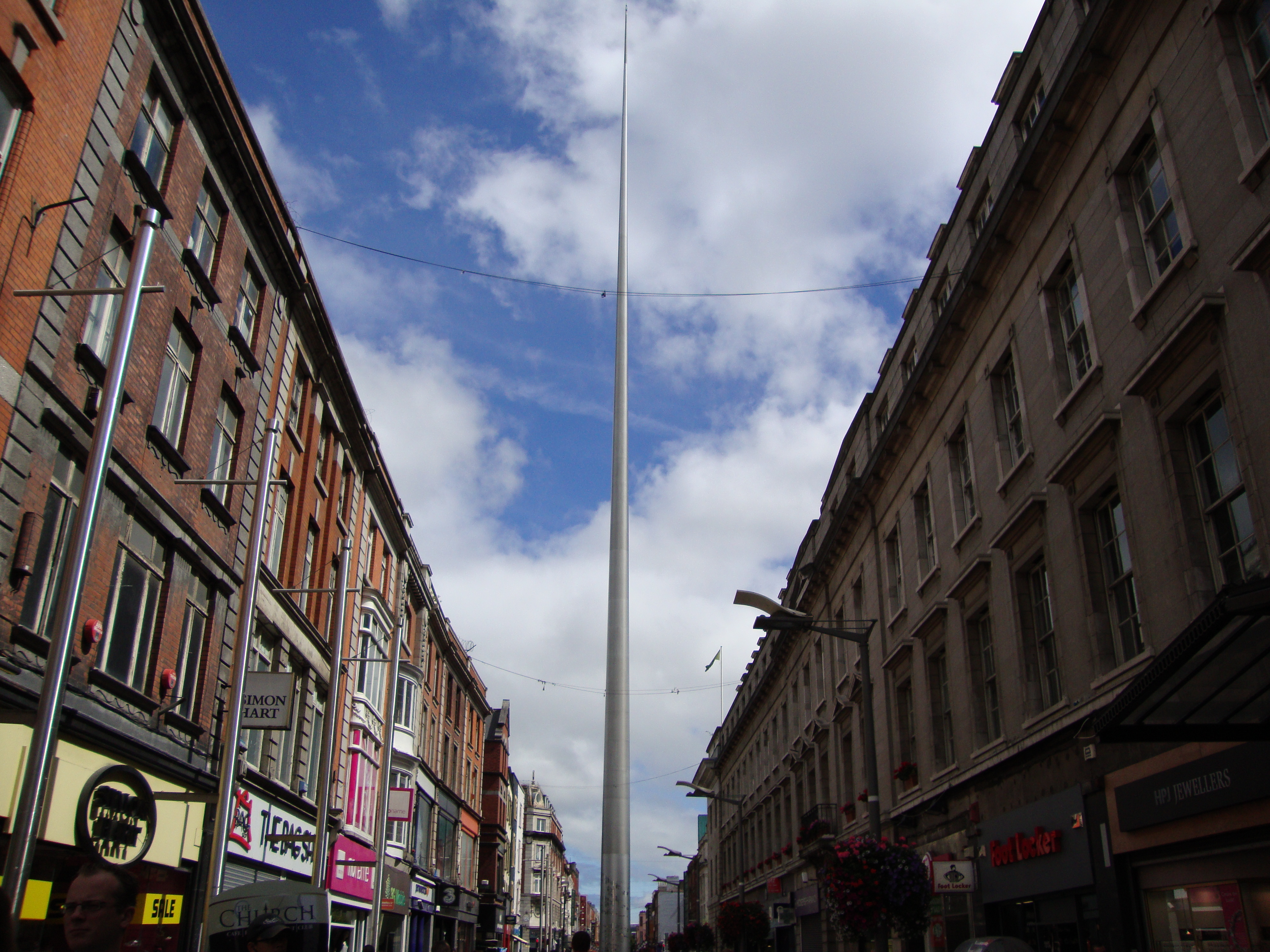
The Spire of Dublin, erected in 2003, viewed from Henry Street

On 29 April 1969, the Irish parliament passed the Nelson Pillar Act, terminating the Pillar Trust and vesting ownership of the site in Dublin Corporation. The trustees received £21,170 in compensation for the Pillar's destruction, and a further sum for loss of income. In the debate, Senator Owen Sheehy-Skeffington argued that the Pillar had been capable of repair and should have been re-assembled and rebuilt.

For more than twenty years the site stood empty, while various campaigns sought to fill the space. In 1970 the Arthur Griffith Society suggested a monument to Arthur Griffith, founder of Sinn Féin, and Pearse, whose centenary would fall in 1979, was the subject of several proposals. None of these schemes were accepted by the corporation. A request in 1987 by the Dublin Metropolitan Streets Commission that the Pillar be rebuilt—with a different statue—was likewise rejected. In 1988, as part of the Dublin Millennium celebrations, businessman Michael Smurfit commissioned in memory of his father the Smurfit Millennium Fountain, erected close to the site of the pillar. The fountain included a bronze statue of Anna Livia, a personification of the River Liffey, sculpted by Éamonn O'Doherty. The monument was not universally appreciated; O'Doherty's fellow-sculptor Edward Delaney called it an "atrocious eyesore". (Note: A popular name for the Anna Livia was "the floozie in the jacuzzi". In 2001, during regeneration work in O'Connell Street, the fountain was demolished and the statue removed, eventually to be re-sited in the Croppies Acre Memorial Park.)

1988 saw the launch of the Pillar Project, aimed at encouraging artists and architects to bring forward new ideas for an appropriate permanent memorial to replace Nelson. Suggestions included a 110-metre (360 ft) flagpole, a triumphal arch modelled on the Paris Arc de Triomphe, and a "Tower of Light" with a platform that would restore Nelson's view over the city. In 1997 Dublin Corporation announced a formal design competition for a monument to mark the new millennium in 2000. The winning entry was Ian Ritchie's Spire of Dublin, a plain, needle-like structure rising 120 metres (390 ft) from the street. The design was approved; on 22 January 2003 it was completed, despite some political and artistic opposition. During the excavations preceding the Spire's construction, the foundation stone of the Nelson Pillar was recovered. Press stories that a time capsule containing valuable coins had also been discovered fascinated the public for a while, but proved illusory.

== Cultural references ==
Before Nelson's Pillar trams slowed, shunted, changed trolley, started for Blackrock, Kingstown and Dalkey, Clonskea, Rathgar and Terenure ... Sandymount Green, Rathmines, Ringsend and Sandymount Tower, Harold's Cross. The hoarse Dublin United Tramway Company's timekeeper bawled them off.

— James Joyce: Ulysses. Section 7: "In the Heart of the Hibernian Metropolis"

The destruction of the Pillar brought a temporary glut of popular songs, including "Nelson's Farewell", by The Dubliners, in which Nelson's airborne demise is presented as Ireland's contribution to the space race. During its more than 150 years, the Pillar was an integral if controversial part of Dublin life, and was often reflected in Irish literature of the period. James Joyce's novel Ulysses (1922) is a meticulous depiction of the city on a single day, 16 June 1904. At the base of the Pillar trams from all parts of the city come and go; meanwhile the character Stephen Dedalus fantasises a scene involving two elderly spinsters, who climb the steps to the viewing gallery where they eat plums and spit the stones down on those below, while gazing up at "the onehandled adulterer".

Oliver St. John Gogarty, in his literary memoir As I Was Going Down Sackville Street, considers the Pillar "the grandest thing we have in Dublin", where "the statue in whiter stone gazed forever south towards Trafalgar and the Nile". That Pillar, says Gogarty, "marks the end of a civilization, the culmination of the great period of eighteenth century Dublin". Yeats's 1927 poem "The Three Monuments" has Parnell, Nelson and O'Connell on their respective monuments, mocking Ireland's post-independence leaders for their rigid morality and lack of courage, the obverse of the qualities of the "three old rascals". A later writer, Brendan Behan, in his Confessions of an Irish Rebel (1965) wrote from a Fenian perspective that Ireland owed Nelson nothing and that Dublin's poor regarded the Pillar as "a gibe at their own helplessness in their own country". In his poem "Dublin" (1939), written as the remaining vestiges of British overlordship were being removed from Ireland, Louis MacNeice envisages "Nelson on his pillar/ Watching his world collapse". Austin Clarke's 1957 poem "Nelson's Pillar, Dublin" scorns the various schemes to remove the monument and concludes "Let him watch the sky/ With those who rule. Stone eye/ And telescopes can prove/ Our blessings are above".

== See also ==
- Monuments and memorials to Horatio Nelson, 1st Viscount Nelson
- List of public art in Dublin

== Notes and references ==
=== Sources ===
==== Books ====
- Behan, Brendan (1991). Confessions of an Irish Rebel. London: Arrow Books. ISBN 978-0-09-936500-6.
- Casey, Christine (2005). The Buildings of Ireland: Dublin. New Haven, CT: Yale University Press. ISBN 0-300-10923-7.
- De Rosa, Peter (1990). Rebels: The Irish Rising of 1916. London: Bantam Press. ISBN 978-0-593-01751-7.
- Dodsworth, Martin (2001). "Mid-Twentieth Century Literature". In Rogers, Pat (ed.). The Oxford Illustrated History of English Literature. Oxford: Oxford University Press. ISBN 0-19-285437-2.
- Fallon, Donal (2014). The Pillar: The Life and Afterlife of the Nelson Pillar. Dublin: New Island Books. ISBN 978-1-84840-326-0.
- Gogarty, Oliver St. John (1937). As I Was going Down Sackville Street. New York: Reynal & Hitchcock. OCLC 289128.
- Harvey, John (1949). Dublin: A Study in Environment. London: Batsford. OCLC 364729.
- Hopkins, Frank (2002). Rare Old Dublin: Heroes, Hawkers & Hoors. Dublin: Mercier Press. ISBN 1-86023-150-0.
- Hunt, Tristram (2014). Ten Cities That Made an Empire. London: Allen Lane. ISBN 978-1-84614-325-0.
- Joyce, James (2002). Ulysses. Mineola, NY: Dover Publications. ISBN 0-486-42444-8.
- Kennedy, Dennis (2013). Dublin's Fallen Hero. Belfast: Ormeau Books. ISBN 978-0-9572564-1-5.
- Kilfeather, Siobhán Marie (2005). Dublin: a Cultural History. Oxford: Oxford University Press. ISBN 978-0-19-518201-9.
- Murphy, Paula (2010). Nineteenth-Century Irish Sculpture: Native Genius Reaffirmed (PDF). New Haven, CT: Yale University Press. ISBN 978-0-300-15909-7. Archived from the original (PDF) on 1 April 2016.
- Myles, Franc (2009). "Admiral Nelson: My part in his downfall". In Fenwick, Joe (ed.). Lost and Found II: Rediscovering Ireland's Past. Dublin: Wordwell. ISBN 978-1-905569-26-7.
- Pakenham, Thomas (1992). The Year of Liberty: The History of the Great Irish Rebellion of 1798. London: Phoenix Books. ISBN 978-1-85799-050-8.
- Steinman, Michael (1983). Yeats's Heroic Figures. Albany, NY: State University of New York Press. ISBN 0-87395-698-2.
- Thackeray, William Makepeace (1911). Irish Sketchbook of 1842. New York: Charles Scribner.
- Townshend, Charles (2006). Easter 1916: The Irish Rebellion. London: Penguin Books. ISBN 978-0-14-101216-2.
- Warburton, J.; Whitelaw, J.; Walsh, Robert (1818). History of the City of Dublin from the Earliest Accounts to the Present time. Vol. II. London: T. Cadell and W. Davies. OCLC 65244719.
- Whelan, Yvonne (2014). "Landscape and Politics". In Jackson, Alvin (ed.). The Oxford Handbook of Modern Irish History. Oxford: Oxford University Press. ISBN 978-0-19-954934-4.

==== Newspapers and journals ====
- "Architects fail to save Pillar". The Guardian. 15 March 1966. p. 3. ProQuest 185198646. (subscription required)
- "Crowds Cheer as Army Blows Up Nelson Pillar". The Irish Times. 14 March 1966. p. 1.
- "Editorial note". The Irish Builder and Engineer: 497. 30 June 1923.
- Garnett, P.F. (June–August 1952). "The Wellington Testimonial". Dublin Historical Record. 13 (2). Old Dublin Society: 48–6. JSTOR 30105448. (subscription required)
- Henchy, Patrick (1948). "Nelson's Pillar". Dublin Historical Record. 10 (2). Old Dublin Society: 53–63. JSTOR 30083917. (subscription required)
- Hickman, Baden (9 March 1966). "Guards on Monuments after Dublin Explosion". The Guardian. p. 6. ProQuest 185265820. (subscription required)
- "Lenihan Condemns Pillar "Outrage"". The Irish Times. 9 March 1966. p. 1.
- "Nelson to Leave Sackville Street". The Manchester Guardian. 26 March 1926. p. 9. ProQuest 477200826. (subscription required)
- Ó Riain, Micheál (Winter 1998). "Nelson's Pillar". History Ireland. 6 (4).
- O'Riordan, Billy (7 March 2016). "The Fall of Nelson's Column Recalled...50 Years On". Irish Examiner.
- Shaw, G. Bernard (26 July 1916). "Some Neglected Morals of the Irish Rising". Maoriland Worker (New Zealand). 7 (284). (This article first appeared in The New Statesman, 6 May 1916)

==== Online ====
- "1894 – Design for entrance and railings, Nelson's Pillar, Dublin". archiseek. 2015.
- "A Poem for Ireland: 'Dublin'". RTÉ. 2013. Archived from the original on 1 March 2015.
- "Anna Livia monument floats to a new home". TheJournal.ie. 25 February 2011.
- "Anna Livia Moves to the Croppies". Dublin City Council. September 2011. Archived from the original on 8 April 2016.
- "A Colonel Writes..." Irish Independent. 19 March 2006.
- Andrews, H.; Coleman, J. (2009). "Luke Gardiner". Dictionary of Irish Biography.
- "Beater, George Palmer". Dictionary of Irish Architects. Irish Architectural Archive.
- Cust, L.H.; Bagshaw, Kaye (2008). "Johnston, Francis". Oxford Dictionary of National Biography (online ed.). Oxford University Press. doi:10.1093/ref:odnb/14936. (Subscription, Wikipedia Library access or UK public library membership required.)(subscription required)
- Fallon, Donal (March 2016). "Dispelling the myths about the bombing of Nelson's Pillar". TheJournal.ie.
- "Five Ways to Compute the Relative Value of a UK Pound Amount, 1270 to Present". MeasuringWorth.
- Fleming, Diarmaid (12 March 2016). "The Man who Blew Up Nelson". BBC Magazine.
- Howley Hayes Architects (February 2009). "The Cumberland Column, Birr, Co. Offally: Conservation Report" (PDF). Contae Uíbh Fhailí County Council. Archived from the original (PDF) on 28 April 2016.
- Liscombe, R. Windsor (2009). "Wilkins, William". Oxford Dictionary of National Biography (online ed.). Oxford University Press. doi:10.1093/ref:odnb/29422. (Subscription, Wikipedia Library access or UK public library membership required.)
- "Lord Mayors of Dublin 1665–2015" (PDF). Dublin City Council. Archived from the original (PDF) on 29 April 2016.
- "Nelson Pillar Act, 1969". electronic Irish Statute Book (eISB). Office of the Attorney General.
- "Nelson Pillar Bill, 1969: Committee and Final Stages". Houses of the Oireachtas: Seanad Éireann Debate Vol. 66 No. 11. 23 April 1969.
- Rodger, N.A.M. (2009). "Nelson, Horatio". Oxford Dictionary of National Biography (online ed.). Oxford University Press. doi:10.1093/ref:odnb/19877. (Subscription, Wikipedia Library access or UK public library membership required.)
- Stephens, H.M.; Harding, Richard (2008). "Blakeney, William". In Harding, Richard (ed.). Oxford Dictionary of National Biography (online ed.). Oxford University Press. doi:10.1093/ref:odnb/2591. (Subscription, Wikipedia Library access or UK public library membership required.)
- "The Partition of Ireland". Borderlands. Queen Mary College, University of London.
- Webb, Alfred. "Walter Cox". Library Ireland from A Compendium of Irish Biography, Dublin 1878.
- White, L.W.W . (2009). "Joseph Christle". Dictionary of Irish Biography.
- "Why some want to give Wellington statue the boot". Irish Independent. 26 August 2003.
