= Up Went Nelson =

Song by The Go Lucky Four

"Up Went Nelson" was a song by The Go Lucky Four (a group of Belfast school teachers: Gerry Burns, Finbar Carolan, John Sullivan and Eamonn McGirr, managed at the time by Gerry Crean). It reached No.1 in the Irish charts where it remained for 10 weeks.

It was sung to the tune of "John Brown's Body" and is about the destruction on 8 March 1966 of Nelson's Pillar in Dublin.

== See also ==
- Nelson's Farewell
