= In Concert (The Dubliners album) =

Live album by The Dubliners
- Released: 1965
- Recorded: December 4, 1964
- Venue: Concert Hall, Cecil Sharp House, London
- Genre: Irish folk
- Length: 44:24
- Label: Transatlantic
- Producer: Nathan Joseph

The Dubliners chronology
The Dubliners (1964)	In Concert (1965)	Finnegan Wakes (1966)

US cover

Professional ratings
Review scores
Source	Rating
Allmusic	3/5 stars

In Concert is a live album by The Dubliners, released in 1965.

By the time The Dubliners had recorded their second album live at the Cecil Sharp House in December 1964, they had become a quintet. Luke Kelly had temporarily left the group and Bobby Lynch and John Sheahan had joined. This was to be Lynch's only recording with The Dubliners, as he left the group when Kelly returned. Sheahan has been with the group ever since and in latter years has become their manager.

== Track listing ==
=== Side one ===
1. Roddy McCorley - 3:47
2. The Twang Man - 2:12
3. Reels: The Sligo Maid & Colonel Rodney - 2:13
4. The Woman from Wexford - 2:42
5. The Patriot Game - 4:23
6. Roisin Dubh - 4:06
7. Air fa la la lo - 3:44

=== Side two ===
1. Peggy Lettermore - 1:49
2. Easy and Slow - 2:59
3. Reel: My Love is in America - 2:07
4. The Kerry Recruit - 4:16
5. The Old Orange Flute - 2:58
6. Reels: The Donegal Reel & The Longford Collector" - 2:10
7. Leaving of Liverpool - 4:58

== Personnel ==
- Barney McKenna - tenor banjo, mandolin, vocals
- John Sheahan - fiddle, mandolin, tin whistle
- Ciarán Bourke - tin whistle, guitar, harmonica, vocals
- Bobby Lynch - guitar, vocals
- Ronnie Drew - guitar, vocals
