= The Dubliners (album) =

Live album by The Dubliners
- Released: 1964
- Studio: Livingston Recording Studios, London
- Genre: Irish folk
- Length: 36:28
- Label: Transatlantic
- Producer: Nathan Joseph

The Dubliners chronology
The Dubliners (1964)	In Concert (1965)

US cover

Professional ratings
Review scores
Source	Rating
Allmusic	4.5/5 stars

The Dubliners is the debut album by the Irish folk band The Dubliners. A studio recording in front of a small invited audience, it was produced by Nathan Joseph and released by Transatlantic Records in 1964. The line-up consisted of Ronnie Drew, Barney McKenna, Luke Kelly and Ciarán Bourke.

The album is referred to on the back cover notes and has been reissued under the title The Dubliners with Luke Kelly as, by the time of its release, Luke had left the band. He rejoined in late 1965.

== Track listing ==
=== Side One ===
1. "The Wild Rover" - 3:13
2. "The Ragman's Ball" - 2:08
3. "Preab San Ól" - 2:14
4. "The High Reel" - 2:58
5. "The Holy Ground" - 2:15
6. "Tramps and Hawkers" - 3:06
7. "Home Boys, Home" - 3:17

=== Side Two ===
1. "Rocky Road to Dublin" - 2:34
2. "Banks of the Roses" - 2:12
3. "I'll Tell My Ma" - 2:06
4. "Swallow's Tail Reel" - 2:49
5. "Jar of Porter" - 2:14
6. "Love Is Pleasing" - 1:47
7. "The Nightingale" - 3:35

== Personnel ==
- Ciarán Bourke - vocals, whistle
- Ronnie Drew - vocals, guitar
- Luke Kelly - vocals, 5-string banjo
- Barney McKenna - tenor banjo

== Mislabelled instrumental tracks ==
The tune labelled "Swallow's Tail Reel" is a medley of "The Swallow's Tail" (O'Neill 536) and "The High Reel" (O'Neill 721), from O'Neill's Dance Music of Ireland.

The tune labelled "The High Reel" is actually a medley of two different tunes. According to McKenna, the title of the first tune is "Códháirdeachais" (meaning "Congratulations" — this an old, pre-1948, spelling of the Irish word; the current spelling would be "Comhghairdeas") and the title of the second is "The Boyne Hunt" (O'Neill 514, Willie Clancy 142). Several people have also noticed the resemblance of the first tune to the better-known "Sporting Nell".

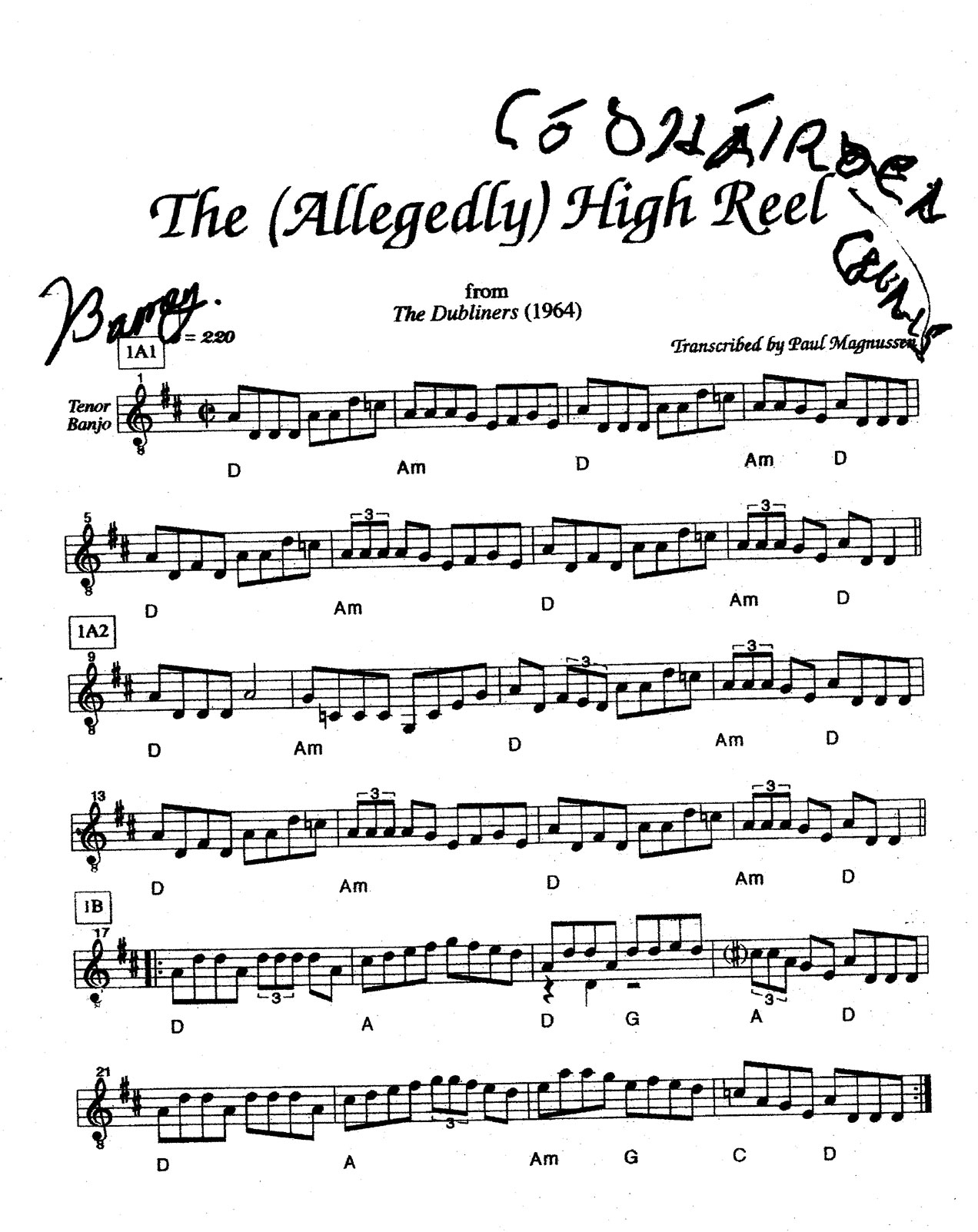
Barney McKenna's correction of the title of a tune mislabelled by the record company.
