= Spirit of the Irish: Ultimate Collection =

Compilation album by The Dubliners
- Released: 2003
- Genre: Irish folk

The Dubliners chronology
Live from the Gaiety (2003)	Spirit of the Irish: Ultimate Collection (2003)	Live At Vicar Street (2006)

Spirit of the Irish: Ultimate Collection is an album by The Dubliners which charted at No. 19 in the UK Album Charts in 2003.

== Track listing ==
1. "The Irish Rover" (with The Pogues)
2. "The Rocky Road to Dublin"
3. "McAlpine's Fusiliers"
4. "Seven Drunken Nights"
5. "The Fields of Athenry"
6. "The Wild Rover"
7. "Dicey Reilly"
8. "Black Velvet Band"
9. "The Auld Triangle"
10. "The Marino Waltz" (instrumental)
11. "Maids When You're Young (Never Wed an Old Man)"
12. "Whiskey in the Jar"
13. "Finnegan's Wake"
14. "Carrickfergus"
15. "Monto"
16. "The Mason's Apron" (Instrumental)
17. "Dirty Old Town"
18. "Ragman's Ball
19. "The Mountain Dew (with The Pogues)
20. "The Town I Loved So Well"

== Chart performance ==
Chart (2003)	Peak position
Irish Albums (IRMA)	43
Scottish Albums (OCC)	9
UK Albums (OCC)	19
UK Independent Albums (OCC)	7
