= Joseph Kirk =

Joseph Kirk may refer to:

- Joe Kirk (1903–1975), American actor
- Joseph Robinson Kirk (1821–1894), Irish sculptor
