= Dennis Campbell Kennedy =

Irish journalist (1936–2026)

Dennis Campbell Kennedy (3 August 1936 – 3 April 2026) was an Irish journalist and a writer on Irish and European affairs. His publications included Square Peg; The Life and Times of a Northern Newspaperman South of the Border, Nonsuch, November 2009, and Climbing Slemish: An Ulster Memoir.

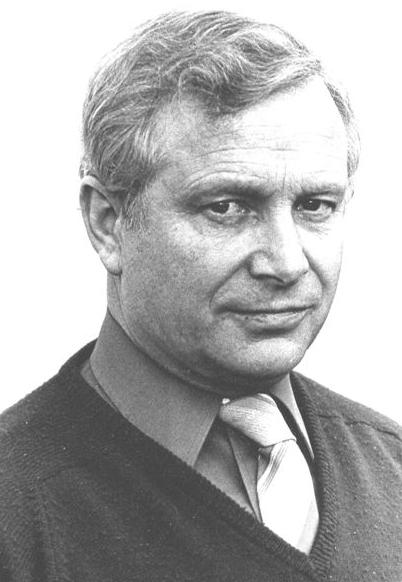
Dennis Kennedy

Kennedy started his career in journalism at the Belfast Telegraph and later joined The Irish Times in various roles. He also served as the Head of the European Commission Office in Northern Ireland and as a lecturer in European Studies at Queen's University Belfast. From 1999 - 2000 he served as President of the The Irish Association for Cultural, Economic and Social Relations as well as the Belfast Literary Society.

== Early life and education ==
Born in Lisburn, Northern Ireland in 1936, Dennis Kennedy was educated at Wallace High School Lisburn, Queen's University, Belfast, and Trinity College Dublin. He graduated in Modern History from Queen's in 1958, and received a PhD from Trinity College Dublin in 1985.

== Career ==
Kennedy worked as a journalist in Northern Ireland, the United States, Ethiopia and the Republic of Ireland, and subsequently as Head of the European Commission office in Belfast, and as lecturer in European Studies in Queen's University Belfast.

His career in journalism began as a reporter with the Belfast Telegraph in 1959. In 1963 he won a Fellowship with the World Press Institute in Minnesota, US, spending more than a year in the United States, including three months working with the Newark News, in New Jersey. He documented this year in the book Yankee Doodles which includes his account of being in the White House on the day of President John F Kennedy's funeral. In 1964 he returned to the Belfast Telegraph as Chief Leader writer, leaving in 1966 to take up a position with the Lutheran World Federation as assistant news editor at their radio station, RVOG, in Addis Ababa, Ethiopia.

In 1968 he returned to Ireland, joining The Irish Times in Dublin as a reporter. He was appointed Diplomatic Correspondent in 1969, European Editor in 1972, Assistant Editor in 1974 and Deputy Editor in 1982. In 1985 he ended 17 years with The Irish Times and returned to Belfast to take up the post of Head of the European Commission Office in Northern Ireland. (1985–1991). In 1993 he joined the academic staff of Queen's University Belfast as a research fellow, and later lecturer, in European Studies. He retired in 2001.

He was President of the Irish Association for Cultural, Economic and Social Relations 1999–2000, President of the Belfast Literary Society, 2006–07, and a founder member of The Cadogan Group (est 1991).

== Personal life and death ==
Kennedy married Katherine Hickey in 1965, and they had three children. Kennedy died on 3 April 2026.

== Publications ==
- 1988: Widening Gulf: Northern Attitudes to the Independent Irish State, 1919–49 (Blackstaff Press)
- 2000: Forging an Identity: Ireland at the Millennium, the Evolution of a Concept (Irish Association)
- 2006: Climbing Slemish: An Ulster Memoir (Trafford)
- 2009: Square Peg: The Life and Times of a Northern Newspaperman South of the Border (Nonsuch) This book was recently launched at the Irish Writers Centre in Dublin by John Horgan, Irish Press Ombudsman.
- 2012: Yankee Doodles – A Memorable Year in America 1963–64 (Ormeau Books)
- 2012: Dublin's Fallen Hero – The Long Life and Sudden Death of Nelson's Pillar (Ormeau Books)
- 2015: Belfast's Giants: Thirty-Six Views of Samson and Goliath (Ormeau Books)
