= Eamonn McGirr =

Eamonn Joseph McGirr (7 November 1940 – 14 June 2004) was an Irish born entertainer in New York's Capital District area.

== Biography ==
He was born on 7 November 1940, in Derry, Northern Ireland to Deward McGirr and Gretta Kerr. He later emigrated to the United States.

He first came to prominence in 1966 with a group of fellow Belfast school teachers: Gerry Burns, Finbar Carolan, and John Sullivan, known collectively as The Go Lucky Four, who released the song "Up Went Nelson".

From 1967, McGirr taught maths at Farnworth Grammar School in Greater Manchester, England. He continued to sing rebel songs at school concerts and organised school outings to local venues where his group, The Go Lucky Four, performed gigs.

In the U.S., McGirr was known for his relentless fundraising for local charities such as the 'Center For The Disabled' in Albany.

In all, McGirr helped raise over $1,000,000 for the Center For The Disabled and families of victims of the September 11, 2001 attacks at the World Trade Center in New York City. He even recorded a song called "The Bravest" (written by Tom Paxton) in tribute to all of the NYC firefighters who lost their lives during the collapse of the WTC buildings.

Most notably, McGirr set a Guinness World Record for endurance singing in 1996 in an effort to raise awareness and money for cerebral palsy, a condition his daughter Mareena was diagnosed with.

McGirr owned a pub, Eamonn's, just outside Albany, New York, which was a favourite spot for local Irish-Americans, especially for its weekly open Irish music sessions. It was severely damaged in a fire on 20 June 2005.

McGirr was paralysed after a serious fall in his pub in November 1996. He died on 14 June 2004 in Albany, New York. He was survived by his daughter Mareena and his wife Mary.
