= Enda McDonagh =

Irish priest (1930–2021)

The Reverend Enda McDonagh
- Roman Catholic priest
- Church: Roman Catholic Church
- Diocese: Tuam

Orders
- Ordination: 1955

Personal details
- Born: 27 June 1930 Bekan, County Mayo, Ireland
- Died: 24 February 2021 (aged 90) Ireland

Enda McDonagh (27 June 1930 – 24 February 2021) was an Irish priest of the Catholic Church. He was ordained a priest in 1955 and served in the Archdiocese of Tuam. He was noted for being the official chaplain to Mary Robinson while she was President of Ireland.

== Early life and education ==
McDonagh was born in Bekan, near Ballyhaunis, County Mayo, on 27 June 1930. He was only one of three in his primary class of 24 to continue on to secondary education. He attended St Jarlath's College in Tuam. He went on to study at Maynooth University, obtaining a Bachelor of Science in 1951. McDonagh was ordained to the Catholic priesthood in 1955. He undertook postgraduate studies at Maynooth, obtaining a Doctorate of Theology in 1957. He subsequently earned a degree at the Pontifical University of Saint Thomas Aquinas and a second doctorate in Munich in 1960.

== Presbyteral ministry ==
McDonagh was appointed Professor of Moral Theology and Canon Law at the Pontifical University at Maynooth in 1958, a post which he held until his retirement from full-time teaching in 1995. In the early 1960s, he founded the InterChurch Association of Moral Theology. He was offered a permanent teaching position at the University of Notre Dame in 1979, but turned it down because he did not want to emigrate from Ireland. McDonagh was also an active supporter of the ecumenical movement and was involved with the conducting of ecumenical retreats with the Church of Ireland and other Anglican clergy. Consequently, he was appointed an honorary canon at St. Patrick's Cathedral, Dublin, in 2007.

McDonagh was very critical about the Catholic Church's refusal to morally condone the use of contraceptives to prevent the spread of HIV/AIDS. One of his ex-students wrote, "In my opinion one of the greatest tragedies to befall the Irish Church in recent times, was its inability to harness the messianic qualities of Enda MacDonagh in a leadership role. but his role of 'outsider' in the Church has played a vital role for many".

McDonagh stated in a 2008 newspaper interview: "I’m a critical but loyal member of the Church. There’s no other church I want to belong to.....I got angry at times about certain things and wrote about them fairly strongly, but at the same time I wanted to be a priest of the Church."

=== Public service ===
McDonagh was a close friend of a former Taoiseach, Garret FitzGerald, and officiated at his funeral Mass. He also served as official chaplain to President Mary Robinson.

McDonagh sat on the Senate of the National University of Ireland, and was part of the board of the Higher Education Authority. He served a three-year term from 1988 as President of The Irish Association for Cultural, Economic and Social Relations. He was appointed the chairman of the governing body of University College Cork in 1999. One year later, he was conferred with an honorary doctorate by University College Cork. He was subsequently awarded an honorary Doctorate of Divinity by Trinity College, Dublin, in 2001.

== Later life ==
McDonagh died on 24 February 2021 at the age of 90.

== Publications ==
Books

Title	Time of first publication	First edition publisher/publication	Unique identifier	Notes
An Irish Reader in Moral Theology	2009	Dublin, Columba	OCLC 1033829590	Volume 1, Foundations
Theology in Winter Light	2010	Dublin, Columba	OCLC 656159077	
An Irish Reader in Moral Theology	2011	Dublin, Columba	OCLC 1033829430	Volume 2, Sex, Marriage and the Family
Faith and the Hungry Grass: a Mayo Book of Theology	2012	Dublin, Columba	OCLC 1118030973	
An Irish Reader in Moral Theology	2013	Dublin, Columba	OCLC 1033911554	Volume 3, Medical and Bio-ethics

Articles

Title	Time of publication	Journal	Volume (Issue)	Page range	Unique identifier	Notes
Mary, Queen of Peace	Dec 2005	The Furrow	56 (120)	676–680	JSTOR 27665260	Text of his 22 August 2005 sermon at the Annual Novena in Knock, County Mayo.
Why the university needs theology	Winter 2006	Hermathena	(181)	141–148	JSTOR 23041626	
"Listening for a Breath of Wind": Peppercanister 26 and 27 by Thomas Kinsella	Autumn 2008	Studies: An Irish Quarterly Review	97 (387)	311–320	JSTOR 25660583	Article on the poetry of Thomas Kinsella
