= William Boyton Kirk =

Irish artist, writer and clergyman

- Born: 29 May 1824; Dublin, Ireland
- Died: 5 July 1900 (aged 76); Ashton-under-Lyne, England
- Family: Thomas Kirk (father); Joseph Robinson Kirk (brother); Eliza Kirk (sister); Thomas Stewart Kirk (nephew)

William Boyton Kirk (29 May 1824 – 5 July 1900) was an Irish artist, writer and clergyman.

== Life ==
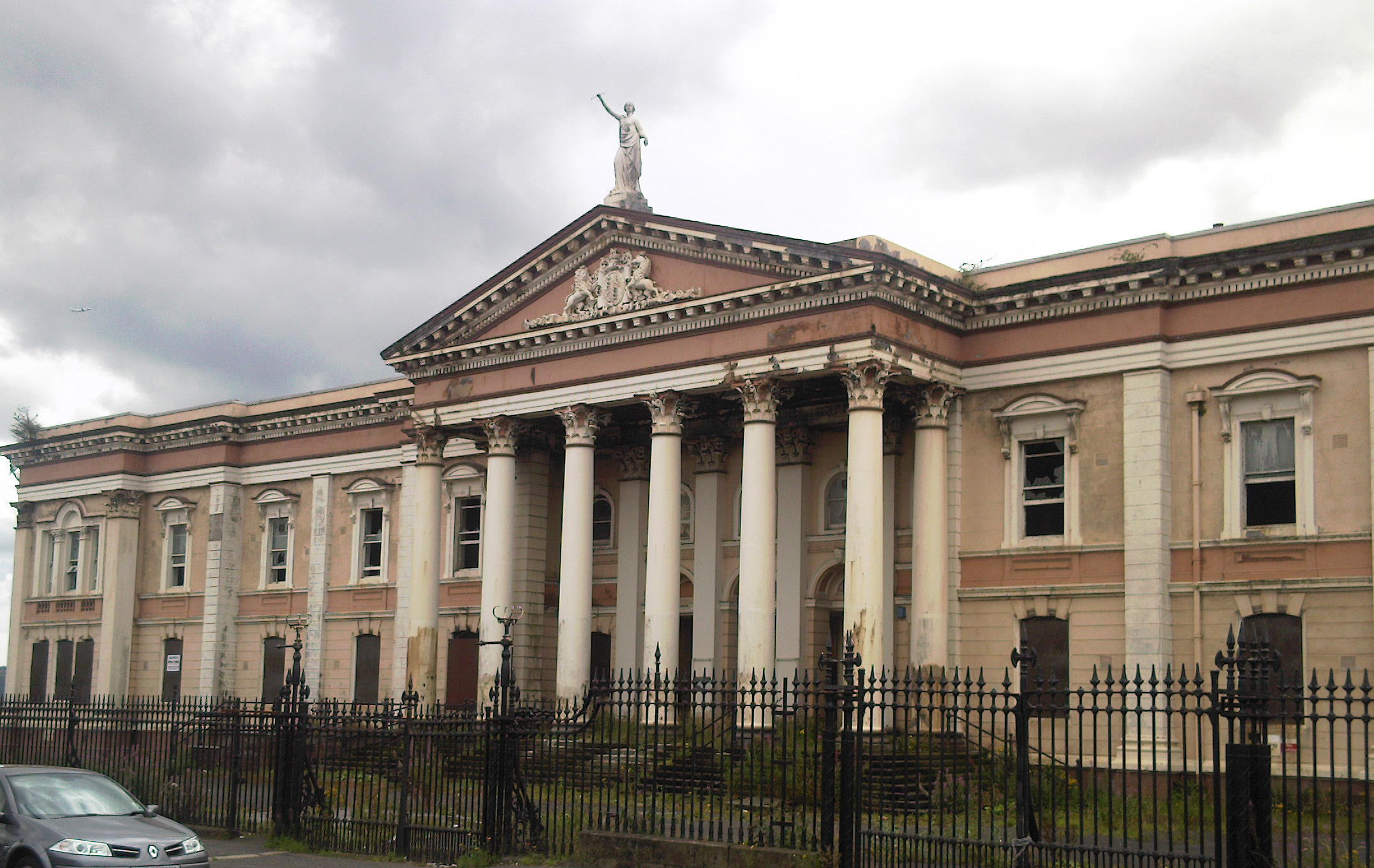
Crumlin Road courthouse

William Boyton Kirk was born on 29 May 1824 in Dublin. He was the second son of the sculptor Thomas Kirk. He trained under his father, and then went on to study at the Dublin Society school in 1839. He entered Trinity College Dublin in 1845, but left without a degree. He exhibited with the Royal Hibernian Academy (RHA) for the first time in 1844, becoming an associate member in 1850. Among his notable works is the figure of Justice on the Belfast courthouse. For Worcester china, he designed the "Shakespeare" dessert service which was exhibited at the Dublin Exhibition of 1853. From 1848 to 1857, he designed for Belleek porcelain. He illustrated an 1853 edition of Shakespeare's Midsummer night's dream.

He married Sarah Watson Mahony, daughter of Denis Fitzgerald Mahony, County Limerick in 1853. He entered the church in 1860, and moved to England becoming the vicar at Holy Trinity, Birkenhead, and later at St Peter's, Ashton-under-Lyne. He resigned from the RHA in 1873, and became an honorary member. He wrote Poems on St Peter's church, Ashton-under-Lyne (1883), The immaculate conception or the martyrs of Santiago, The sailor's complaint, The martyrs of Antioch, and Antiqities of Ashton-under-Lyne and neighbourhood. He died in Ashton-under-Lyne on 5 July 1900.
