= Thomas Stewart Kirk =

Irish sculptor

- Born: Thomas Kirk Stewart; 11 November 1848; New York, United States
- Died: 8 October 1879 (aged 30); Kansas City
- Family: Thomas Kirk (grandfather); Joseph Robinson Kirk (uncle); Eliza Kirk (aunt); William Boyton Kirk (uncle)

Thomas Stewart Kirk also known as Thomas Kirk Stewart (11 November 1848 – 8 October 1879) was an Irish sculptor.

== Life ==
Thomas Kirk Stewart was born in New York on 11 November 1848. His mother was Mary Anne Kirk, the daughter of sculptor Thomas Kirk. His father was also Irish, who emigrated with his wife. She was an accomplished musician and Greek scholar. Kirk was orphaned at a young age, and returned to Dublin to be raised by the Kirk family, living with his uncle Joseph. Like his grandfather, aunt, and uncles, Stewart became a sculptor, specialising in portrait busts. He exhibited with the Royal Hibernian Academy from 1868 to 1873, when he started referring to himself as Thomas Stewart Kirk.

One of his most notable works is the 1868 bust of the president of the Royal College of Surgeons in Ireland, George Hornidge Porter. Other portrait busts by Kirk are John Skipton Mulvany and Dr James Stannus Hughes, both from 1871. All three of these busts were exhibited at the Dublin Exhibition of 1872.

Kirk left Dublin in 1879, and died in Kansas City, United States on 8 October 1879.
