= Eliza Kirk =

Irish sculptor

- Born: Elizabeth Kirk; 1812; Dublin, Ireland
- Died: Around 1856
- Family: Thomas Kirk (father); Joseph Robinson Kirk (brother); William Boyton Kirk (brother); Thomas Stewart Kirk (nephew)

Eliza Kirk (1812 – around 1856) was an Irish sculptor.

== Life ==
Elizabeth Kirk was born in 1812 in Dublin. She was the second daughter of the sculptor Thomas Kirk. She trained with her father, and was best known for her miniature portrait busts. From 1839 to 1859 she exhibited with the Royal Hibernian Academy. Her piece, Infant Bacchus, was exhibited in the National Exhibition in Dublin in 1853. Another work of Kirk's, which is still in the possession of the descendants of the family, is a bust of her nephew and fellow sculptor Thomas Stewart Kirk. The date of her death is not known, but is possibly around 1856.
