= Finnegan Wakes =

Live album by The Dubliners
- Released: 1966
- Recorded: 26–27 April 1966
- Venue: Gate Theatre, Dublin
- Genre: Irish folk
- Length: 38:03
- Label: Transatlantic
- Producer: Nathan Joseph

The Dubliners chronology
In Concert (1965)	Finnegan Wakes (1966)	A Drop of the Hard Stuff (1967)

Singles from Finnegan Wakes
- 1. "Nelson's Farewell" Released: 1966

Alternative cover

Professional ratings
Review scores
Source	Rating
AllMusic	3/5 stars

Finnegan Wakes is a live album by The Dubliners. Recorded at the Gate Theatre on 26 and 27 April 1966 and produced by Nathan Joseph, this was The Dubliners' final recording for Transatlantic Records. But it was also their first to feature their first established line-up of Ronnie Drew (vocals and guitar), Barney McKenna (tenor banjo and mandolin), Luke Kelly (vocals and banjo), Ciarán Bourke (vocals, guitar, tin whistle and harmonica) and John Sheahan (fiddle, tin whistle and mandolin). The album featured "Nelson's Farewell", a satirical song about the bombing and destruction of Nelson's Pillar in O'Connell Street, Dublin on 8 March 1966.

== Track listing ==
Side one

1. "Finnegan's Wake"
2. "Hornpipes: The Sunshine Hornpipe & The Mountain Road"
3. "Monto"
4. "The Dublin Fusiliers"
5. "Hornpipe: Chief O'Neill's Favourite"
6. "The Sea Around Us" (Dominic Behan)

Side two

1. "McAlpine's Fusiliers" (Dominic Behan)
2. "Hot Asphalt"
3. "The Glendalough Saint"
4. "Reel: Within a Mile from Dublin"
5. "Will You Come to the Bower"
6. "Nelson's Farewell" ('Galway Joe' Dolan)
