= Thomas Kirk (sculptor) =

Irish sculptor

- Born: 1781; Cork, Ireland
- Died: 19 April 1845 (aged 63–64); Dublin, Ireland
- Resting place: Mount Jerome Cemetery
- Known for: Sculpture
- Family: Joseph Robinson Kirk (son); William Boyton Kirk (son); Eliza Kirk (daughter); Thomas Stewart Kirk (grandson)

Thomas Kirk (1781 – 19 April 1845) was an Irish sculptor.

Born in Cork, Kirk studied at the Dublin Society's School where he won prizes in 1797 and 1800. He later worked for Henry Darley, a skillful builder and stone-cutter from County Meath, based in Abbey Street, Dublin. Kirk was acclaimed for his fine relief work on mantle-pieces and monuments. Much of his work can be seen in the Royal College of Surgeons, the Royal Dublin Society and in the library of Trinity College, Dublin. He worked on committees in the Royal Dublin Society and he was a member of the Royal Hibernian Academy.

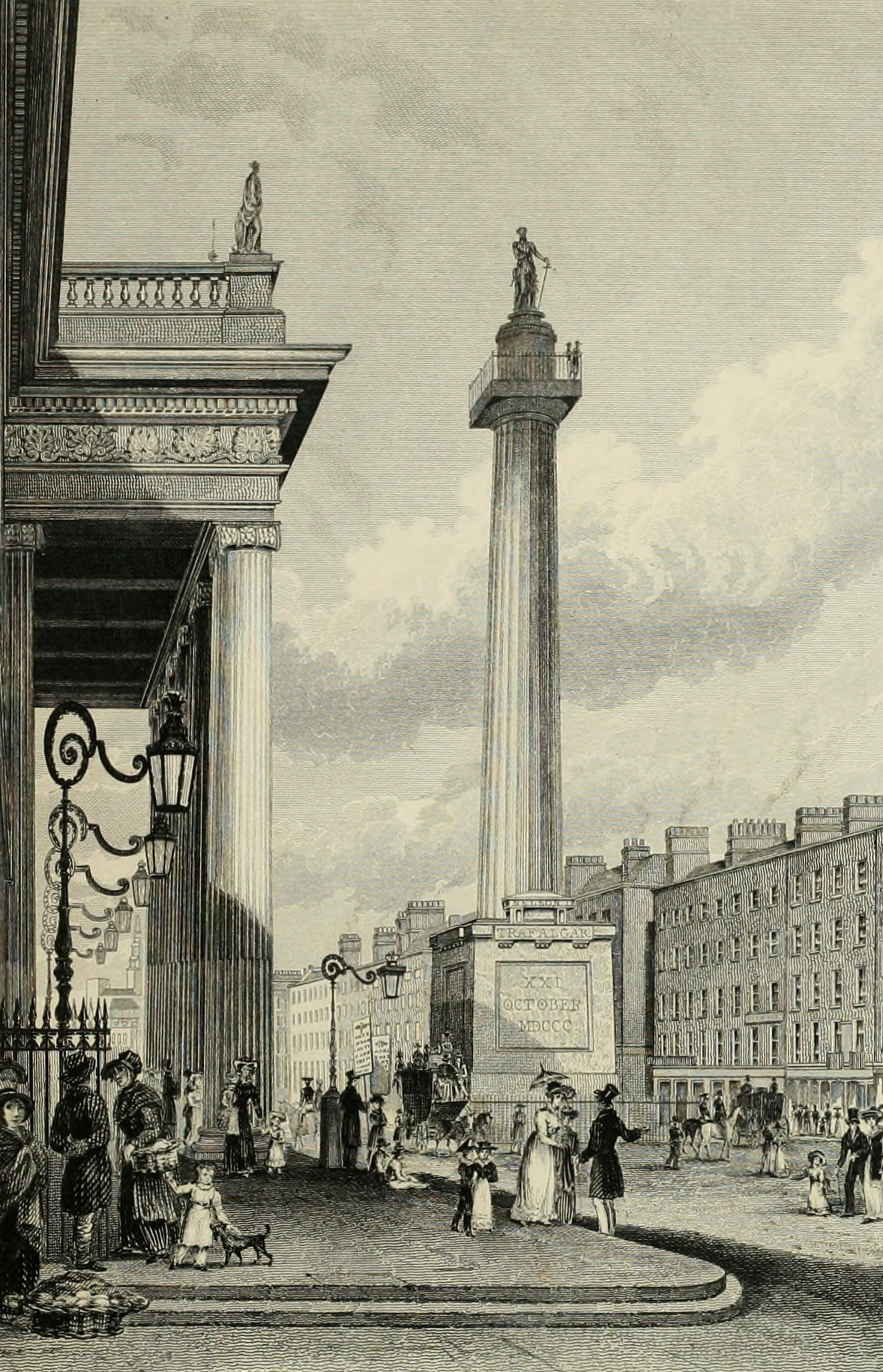
Nelson's Pillar c. 1830

He executed numerous church memorials throughout the country. His favourite relief was one of the Good Samaritan, which was well suited for memorials to either doctors or clergymen.

One of his earliest commissions, which appeared in 1809, was the statue of Nelson for Nelson's Pillar in O'Connell Street, Dublin. This monument was destroyed by an explosion on 8 March 1966. Another of Kirk’s commissions was the statue, in Limerick, of Thomas Spring Rice, a former MP and Chancellor of the Exchequer. Another was a bust of Arabella Diana Cope whose second husband, the Lord Whitworth who was then Lord Lieutenant of Ireland. Commissioned in 1818 it was displayed at the Society of Artists in Hawkins Street in 1819 alongside a bust of her husband by John Smyth. The bust of Arabella can be seen on display at Knole.

He died in 1845 and is interred in Mount Jerome Cemetery, Dublin. His sons, Joseph Robinson Kirk (1821-1894) and William Boyton Kirk (1824-1900), daughter Eliza Kirk (b. 1812) and grandson Thomas Stewart Kirk (1848-1879) were also sculptors. His eldest daughter Mary Anne was a Greek scholar and accomplished musician.

After his death his works were exhibited at the 1852 Irish Industrial Exhibition, the 1852 annual exhibition of the Royal Hibernian Academy and the 1872 Dublin Exhibition of Arts, Industries and Manufactures.

== Select list of memorials ==
- Jane Vernon (née Kingsbury, wife of Reverend George Vernon, Rector of Carlow, died 1827 aged 29) in St. Mary's church, Carlow. Kirk's relief shows the poor and the young of Carlow mourning her. To the left are the tools of Jane Vernon's accomplishments: a harp, an easel and a sculptor's chisel.
- Nathaniel Sneyd (died 1833) had two memorials, one in Cavan and a life-size neo-classical recumbent effigy in the crypt of Christ Church Cathedral, Dublin. Kirk represents Sneyd lying dead with a female figure weeping over him.

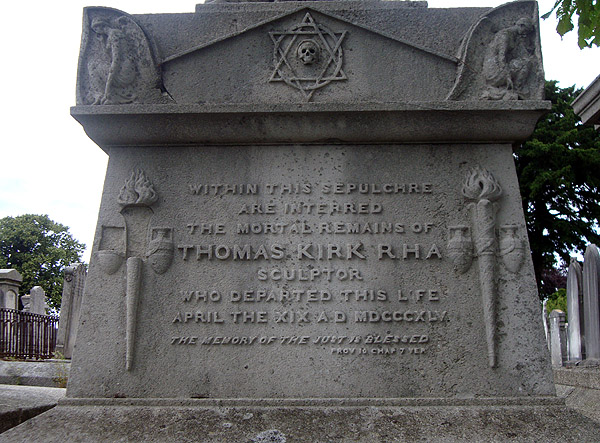
Base of Kirk's own memorial in Mount Jerome cemetery

- Rev. Joseph Storey (d. 1838) in Cavan.
- Rev. George Hill (d. 1837) at Comber, County Down.
- Several memorials in St. Ann's Church, Dublin.
- John Chambers (d. 1800), in St. George's church, Dublin.
- Thomas Abbott (d. 1837) in Christ Church Cathedral, Dublin.
- Sir John Andrew Stevenson (d. 1833). In 1843, a marble cenotaph sculpted by Kirk was erected in the Musicians Corner at Christ Church Cathedral. His monument has a bust and a single choirboy. Originally there were two choir boys, but the sculptor found such difficulty in extracting payment for his work that he removed the second one.
- Dr. Spray (d. 1827), in St Patrick's Cathedral, Dublin.
- Thomas Ball (d. 1826), in St. Patrick's Cathedral.
- Rev. Thomas Clarke and others in the Pro-Cathedral, Dublin.
- Admiral Sir William Sidney Smith (1764-1840) "Commissioned by the House of Commons as a national monument. It is Kirk's last major work and one of his best. On completion it was first shown at the Royal Academy exhibition in spring 1845 (no.1324) but received at Greenwich that July and installed in the Naval Gallery in the Painted Hall at Greenwich Hospital." Now in the National Maritime Museum, Greenwich, London, England. https://www.rmg.co.uk/collections/objects/rmgc-object-63992
