= The Irish Association for Cultural, Economic and Social Relations =

Irish cultural, economic, and social forum

The Irish Association for Cultural, Economic and Social Relations is a membership-driven forum for the shared concerns of a wide range of organisations and individuals involved in North–South Irish affairs. The current (2025) President is Evelyn Collins.

The Association was founded in 1938 as an all-Ireland organisation. It has long acted as a bridge to and between cultural, economic and social issues and interests across the island.

== Creation ==
The Association's founding criterion is:

The principal objective of The Irish Association is the promotion of communication, understanding and co-operation between all people of Ireland both North and South. The Association is a non-party political and non-sectarian body with the aim 'to make reason and goodwill take the place of passion and prejudice in Ireland, North and South'.

The Association was created by unionists and nationalists alarmed by growing divisions across the island in the decade after the creation of the two new jurisdictions on the island and was a deliberate attempt to prevent ever more bitter relations.

An account of the Association's origins is provided by (Lord) Paul Bew in his 1993 book published by the Institute of Irish Studies at Queen's University Belfast.

In a memoir by the son of an early President John Johnston (served 1946–1954) there is a further elaboration of the circumstances in which the Association was founded and an illuminating account of important meetings held in the 1960s.

Vision: Reason and goodwill to take the place of passion and prejudice in Ireland, North and South.

Mission: To make a real contribution to the growth of reconciliation, mutual trust and respect through providing an impartial forum for dialogue and debate.

The Irish Association receives support from a variety of funders including local authorities across the island, Department of Foreign Affairs and Trade (Ireland) and Northern Ireland's Community Relations Council.

== Current work ==
In 2013 the Association celebrated 75 years of working for better relations across the island with a closer collaboration with History Ireland and an extensive series of 'hedge schools' reached new audiences and helped foster better relations. The anniversary year culminated with a dinner in the Long Gallery, Parliament Buildings (Northern Ireland).

The Association's President from 2015-7 was Cllr Dr. Chris McGimpsey and in December 2017 the distinguished public servant and former Director General of Raidió Teilifís Éireann Bob Collins assumed the presidency. Mr Collins has involved himself in public affairs in Belfast since leaving RTE in 2006.

More recently the Association has been alive to the issues thrown up by the UK's pro-Brexit vote and the concomitant risk of widening the gulf between the people of both jurisdictions on the island. To that end it has worked with other organisations to provide a platform for discussion, reflection and debate, most significantly in 2015 when Charles Flanagan TD spoke alongside Arlene Foster at QUB at a seminar co-organised by the association and Institute of International and European Affairs.

In July 2019 the Association organised an event at the Royal Irish Academy on the theme of 'Belief in the Future', focusing on the role religion would play in Ireland's future, given societal changes. At the event, the former Green Party (Ireland) leader, Rev Trevor Sargent criticised religion in Ireland for focusing so much on issues of personal morality, saying, “whether we get into discussions about divorce, abortion, sexuality" and that “the amount of column inches that occupy those elements of religious activity and religious belief and conviction are hugely unbalanced compared to an equally strong biblical code which values social justice, human rights, intergenerational responsibility and the humility that come with asking God’s help in stewarding this wonderful creation.”

In 2019 the President, Bob Collins took part in a panel discussion at the Ulster Museum on Border Polls, Referendums and Democracy noting that "to the extent any real discussions are happening about a border poll, they’re one sided. He feels that “there needs to be clarity about what that change would look like”.

== Past Presidents ==
1938-1946: James Caulfeild, 8th Viscount Charlemont

1946-1954: Professor Joseph Johnston

1954-1963: Sir Graham Larmour

1963-1966: J. F. Dempsey LL.D.

1967-1970: Martin Wallace

1970-1973: Edmond Grace

1973-1976: William Marshall

1976-1978: Donal Barrington S. C.

1978-1980: A. S. J. O'Neill

1980-1982: Senator Trevor West

1982-1984: Lewis Semple

1984-1986: Una O'Higgins O'Malley

1986-1988: Brian Garrett

1988-1991: Rev. Prof. Enda McDonagh

1991-1993: Paul Bew

1993-1995: John Bowman

1995-1997: Prof. Bernard Cullen

1997-1999: Senator Mary Henry

1999-2000: Dr. Dennis Campbell Kennedy

2000-2002: Terry Stewart

2003-2004: Paul McErlean

2004-2006: Dr. Jean Whyte

2006-2009: Professor Pauline Murphy

2009-2014: Rev. Brian Kennaway

2014-2016: Dáithí Ó Ceallaigh

2016-2017: Cllr. Dr. Chris McGimpsey

2017 - 2019: Bob Collins

2019 - 2023: Stephen Douds

2023 - 2025: Professor Brian M. Walker
