= Joseph Robinson Kirk =

Irish sculptor

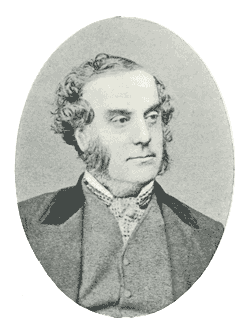
- Born: c. 1821; Dublin, Ireland
- Died: 30 August 1894 (aged 72–73)
- Family: Thomas Kirk (father); William Boyton Kirk (brother); Eliza Kirk (sister); Thomas Stewart Kirk (nephew)

Joseph Robinson Kirk (c. 1821 – 30 August 1894) was an Irish sculptor.

== Life ==
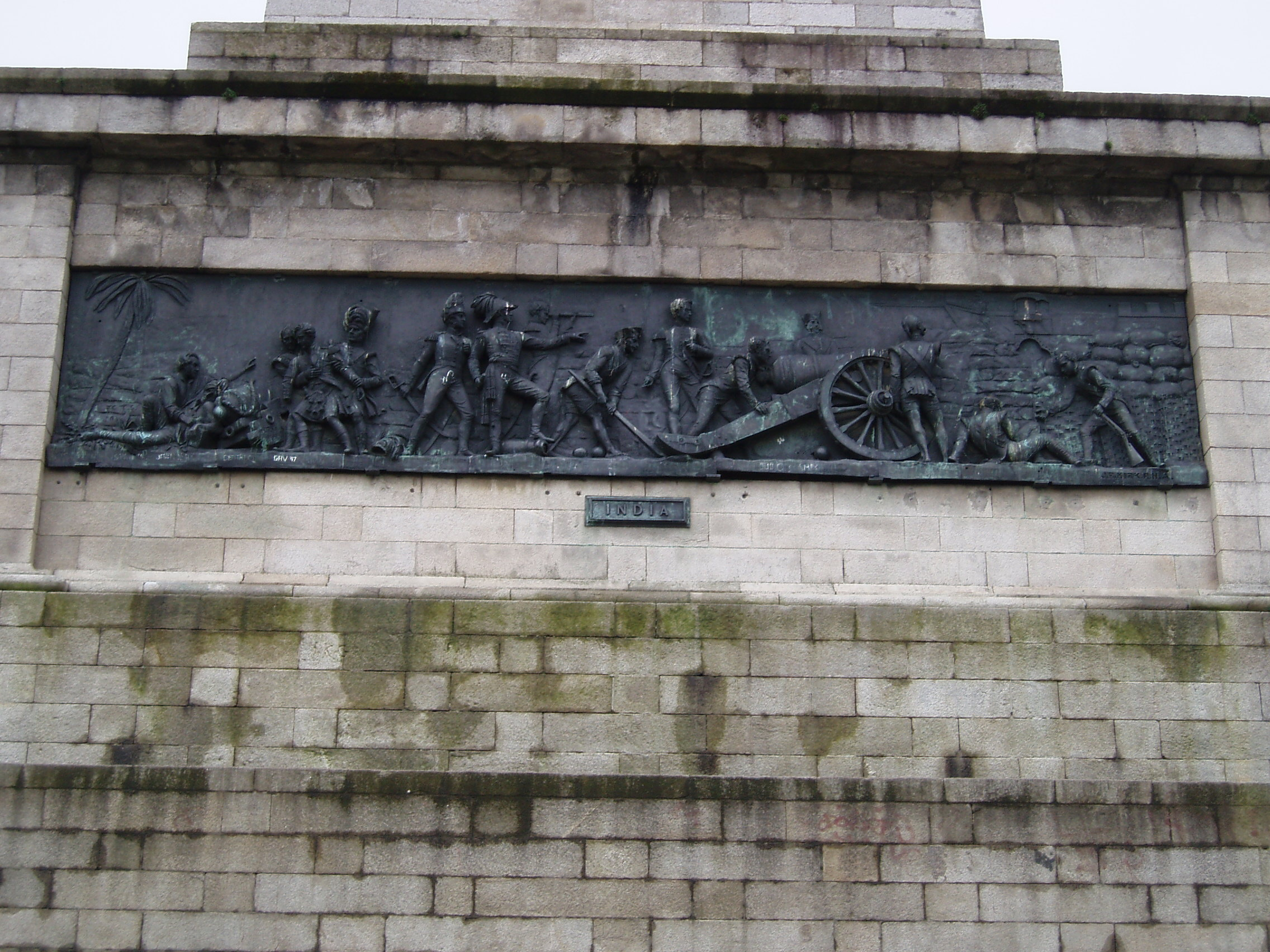
Indian Wars by Kirk

He was born in Dublin in about 1821, the fifth child and eldest son of Thomas Kirk and Eliza Robinson. He lived in Jervis Street and studied with his father and at the Dublin Society's School, alongside his brother William and sister Eliza. In 1843, he spent a year in Rome, which he funded with the sale of his marble sculpture Andromeda. This piece had been awarded a prize by the Irish Art Union. He entered Trinity College Dublin (TCD) in 1838, graduating with a BA in 1843. In 1845, he married Jane Rachel Murray.

From 1843, he exhibited with the Royal Hibernian Academy, becoming an associate members in 1845, and a full member in 1854. From 1846 to 1862 he also exhibited with the Royal Academy, London. He became master of the Royal Dublin Society modelling school in 1852, succeeding from Constantine Panormo.

Some of his more famous works include the figures of Divinity, Law, Medicine and Science on the campanile in TCD, a relief at the base of the Wellington Monument and a monument to the bishop of Kildare, C. D. Lindsay, in Christ Church Cathedral. He also executed the figure over his father's grave in Mount Jerome Cemetery. Like his father he executed a number of unique reliefs for church memorials throughout the country.

After his nephew, Thomas Stewart Kirk, was orphaned he lived with Kirk and his family. Kirk died on 30 August 1894 at his home, on Milward Terrace, Bray. He is buried in Mount Jerome Cemetery, Dublin.
