= Wellington Monument, Dublin =

Obelisk in Dublin

Wellington Monument
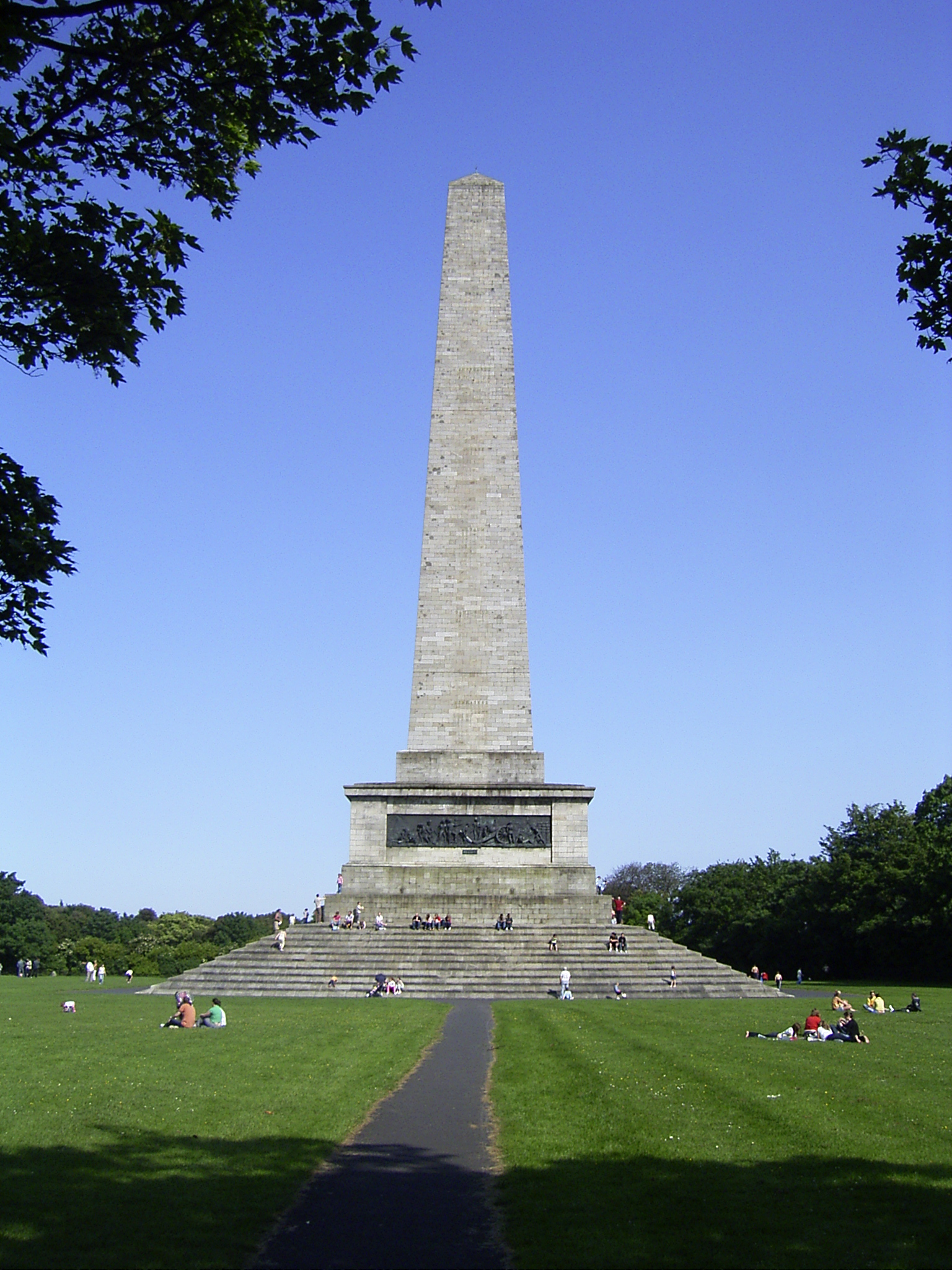
- Wellington Monument (Wellington Testimonial) in Dublin's Phoenix Park
- Interactive map of Wellington Monument
- Location: Phoenix Park, Dublin, Ireland
- Coordinates: 53.3490°N 6.3031°W
- Designer: Robert Smirke
- Type: Obelisk
- Material: Granite
- Height: 62 metres (203 ft)
- Beginning date: 1817
- Opening date: 1861
- Dedicated to: Arthur Wellesley, 1st Duke of Wellington

The Wellington Monument (Irish: Leacht Wellington), or sometimes the Wellington Testimonial, (Note: A testimonial is erected to a living person, as Wellington was when construction started) is an obelisk located in the Phoenix Park, Dublin, Ireland.

The testimonial is situated at the southeast end of the Park, overlooking Kilmainham and the River Liffey. The structure is 62 metres (203 ft) tall, making it the largest obelisk in Europe.

== History ==
The Wellington Testimonial was built to commemorate the victories of Field Marshal Arthur Wellesley, the 1st Duke of Wellington. Wellington, a senior-ranking British military commander and, later, politician, also known as 'the Iron Duke', was born in Ireland. Originally planned to be located in Merrion Square, it was built in the Phoenix Park after opposition from the square's residents.

The obelisk was designed by the architect Sir Robert Smirke and the foundation stone was laid in 1817. There were plans for a statue of Wellington on horseback to be erected on a separate pedestal at the base of the obelisk, and when the obelisk was put in place in 1822, so too was this pedestal for the planned equestrian statue. A shortage of funds eventually delayed the production of the intended statue, leaving the pedestal looking unfinished for some decades until Wellington's death in 1852 which provoked a renewed urgency to complete the monument so that it wouldn't "look like an insult", according to Professor Paula Murphy at UCD. Only the bronzes were installed at the base of the obelisk in the end, and the pedestal was removed. The obelisk was opened to the public on 18 June 1861.

According to Murphy, the round tower which was completed at Glasnevin Cemetery in 1860 "might be viewed as a response, of an oppositional nature, to Wellington's obelisk in the Phoenix Park".

== Features ==
There are four bronze plaques cast from cannons captured at Waterloo – three of which have pictorial representations of his career while the fourth has an inscription. The plaques depict 'Civil and Religious Liberty' by John Hogan, 'Waterloo' by Thomas Farrell and the 'Indian Wars' by Joseph Robinson Kirk. The inscription reads:

Asia and Europe, saved by thee, proclaim
Invincible in war thy deathless name,
Now round thy brow the civic oak we twine
That every earthly glory may be thine.

== Cultural references ==
The monument is referenced throughout James Joyce's Finnegans Wake. The first page of the novel alludes to a giant whose head is at "Howth Castle and Environs" and whose toes are at "a knock out in the park (p. 3)"; John Bishop extends the analogy, interpreting this centrally located obelisk as the prone giant's male member. A few pages later, the monument is the site of the fictional "Willingdone Museyroom" (p. 8).

== Gallery ==
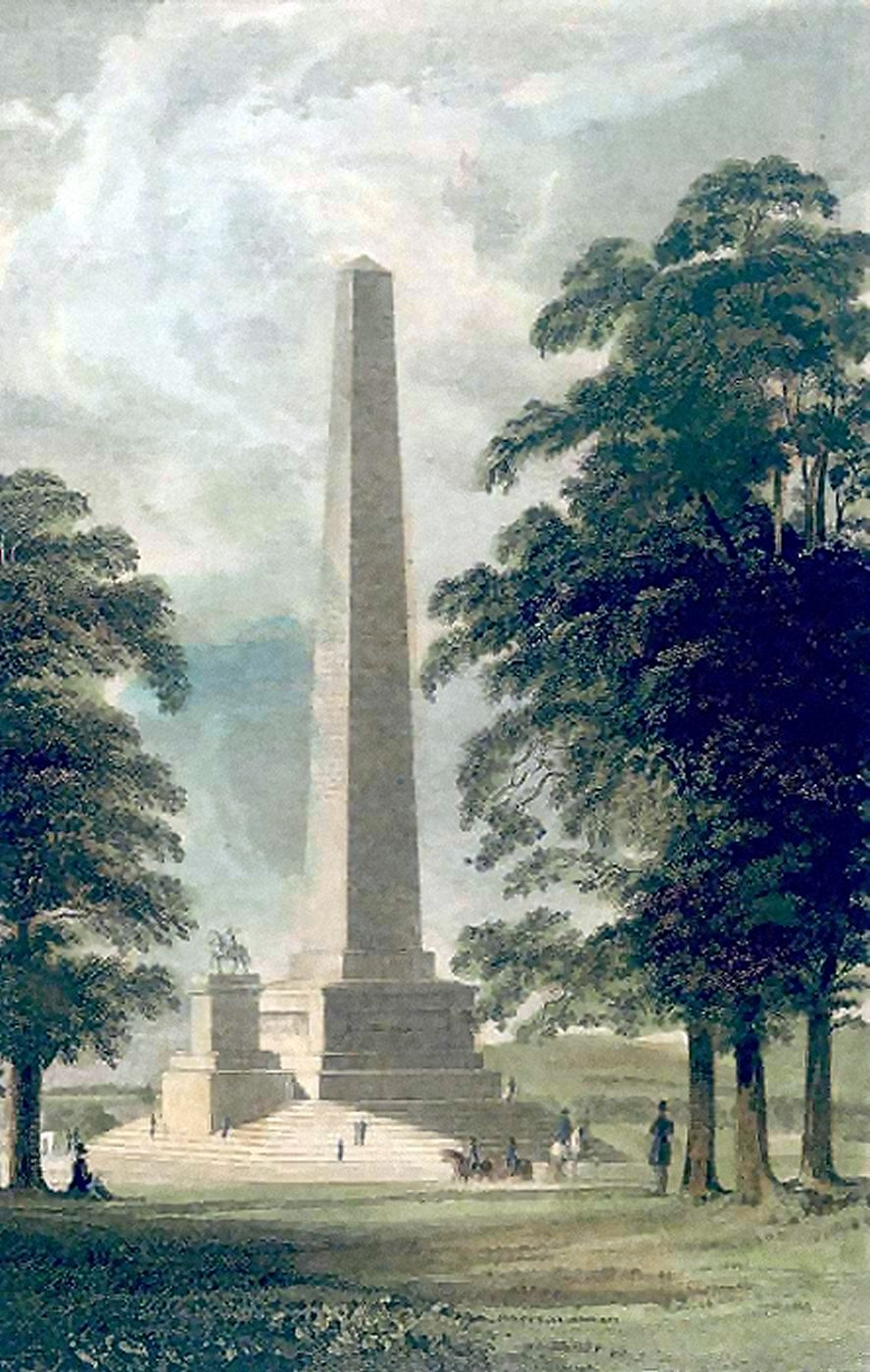
Engraving ca 1830 (including planned pedestal for statue of Wellington on horseback)

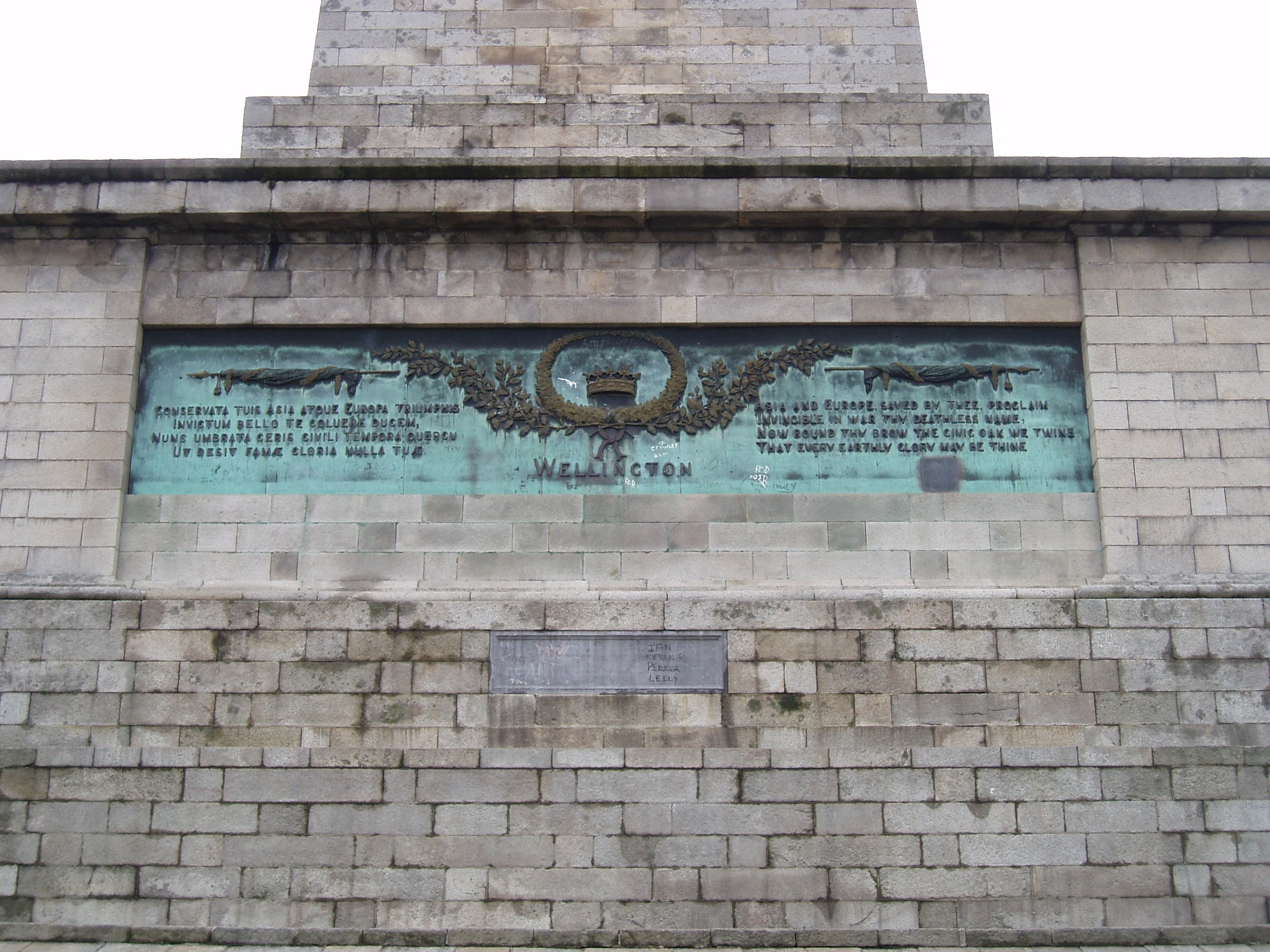
Inscription

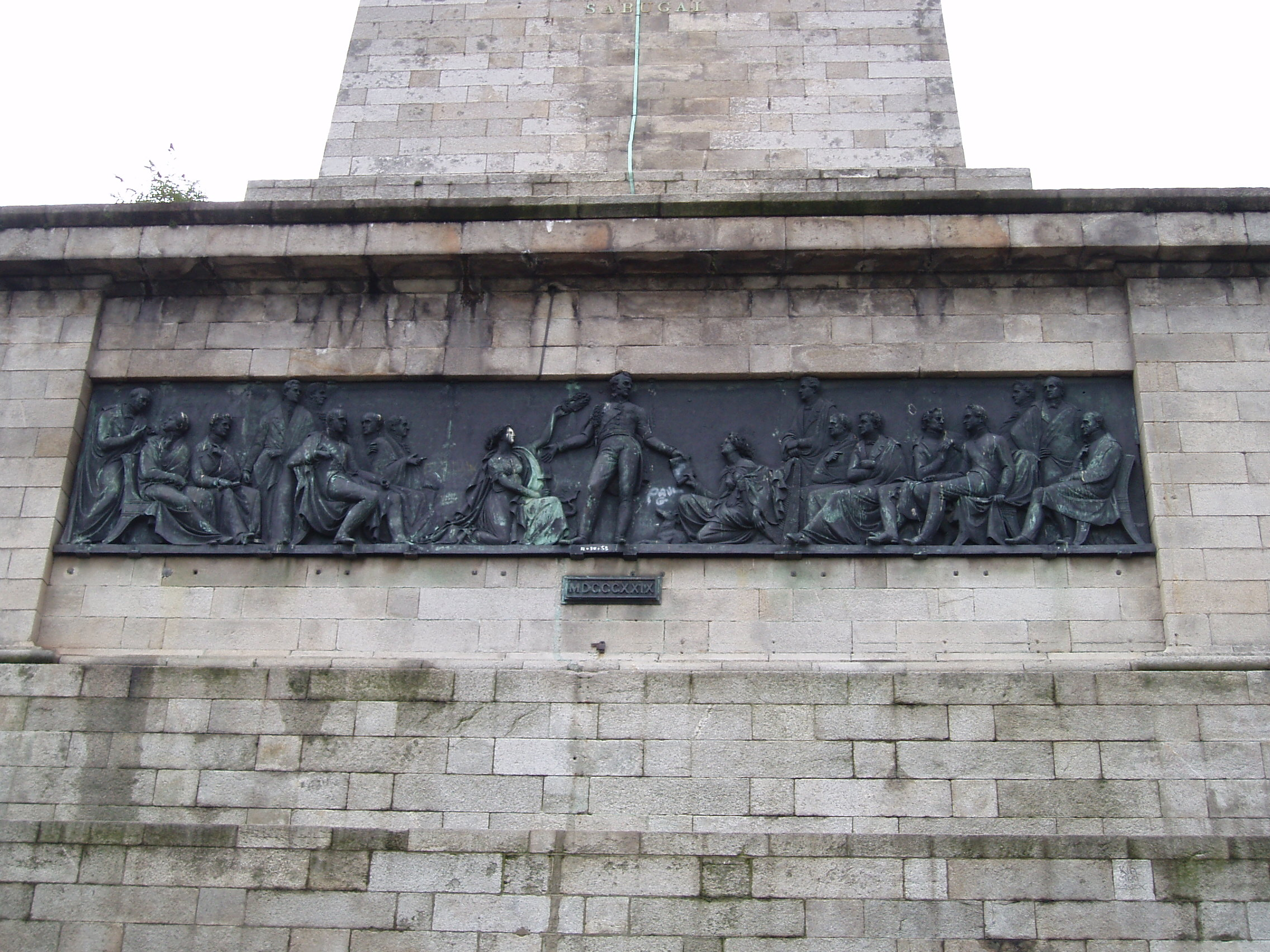
Plaque

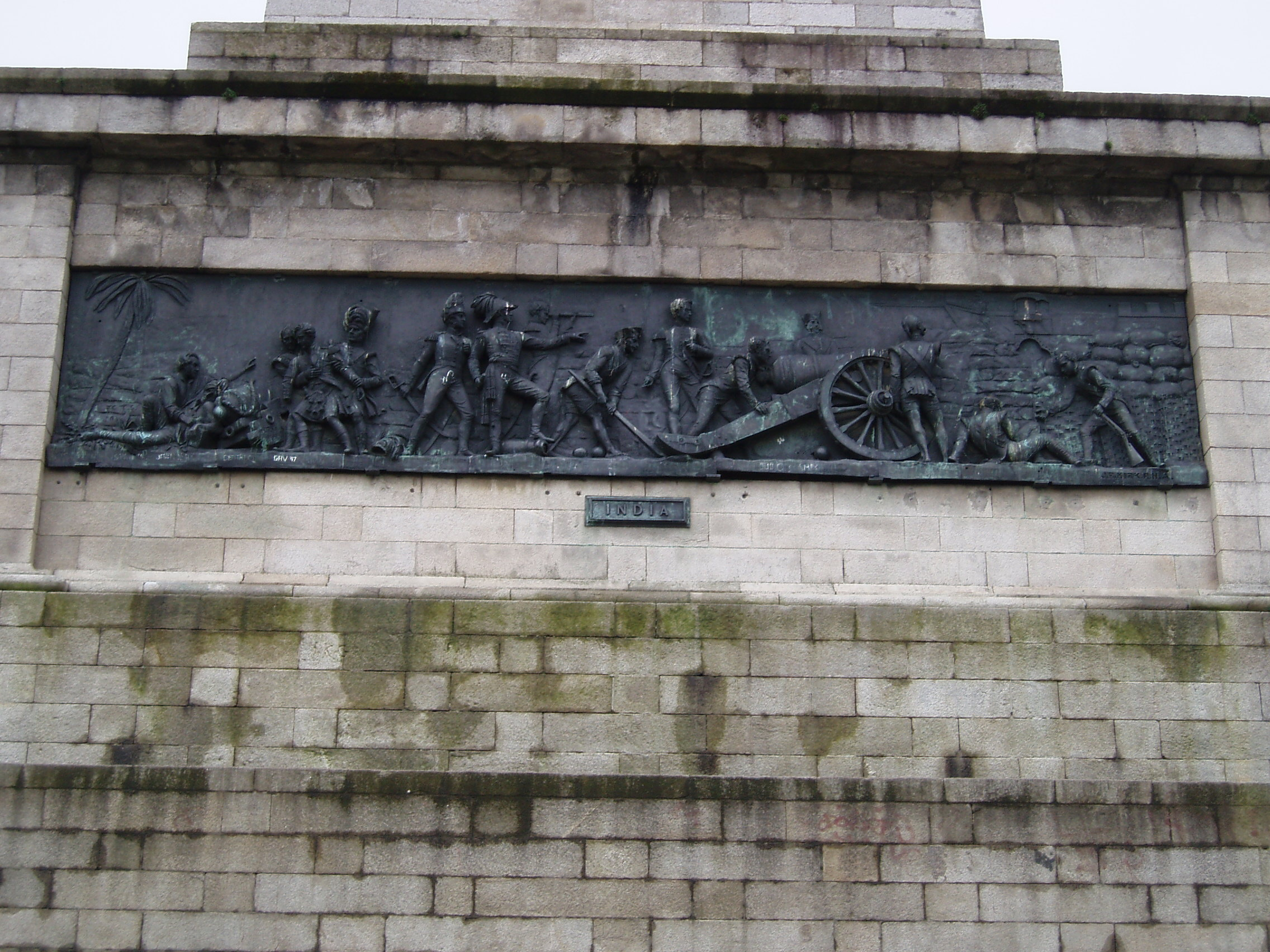
'Indian Wars'

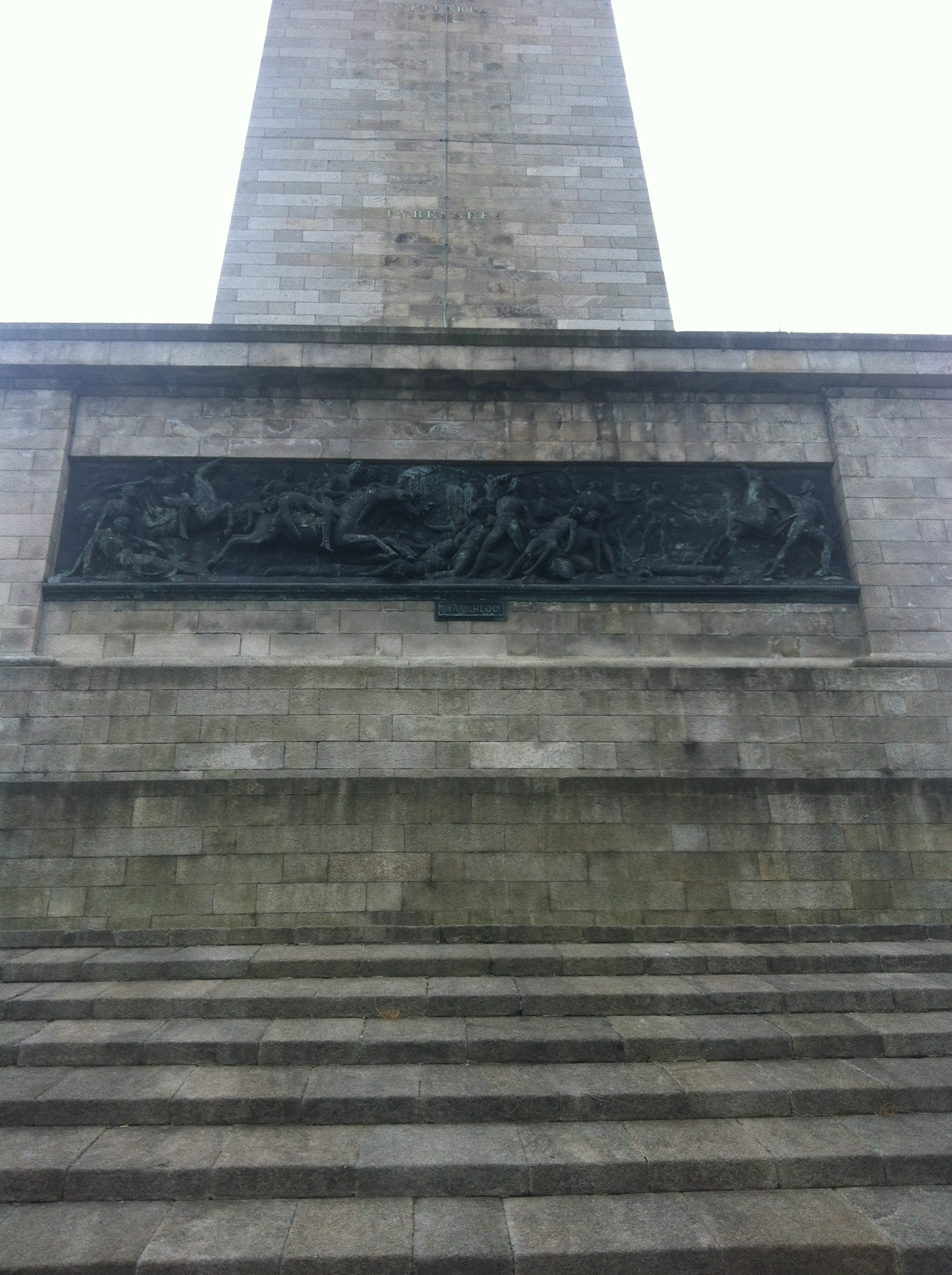
'Waterloo'

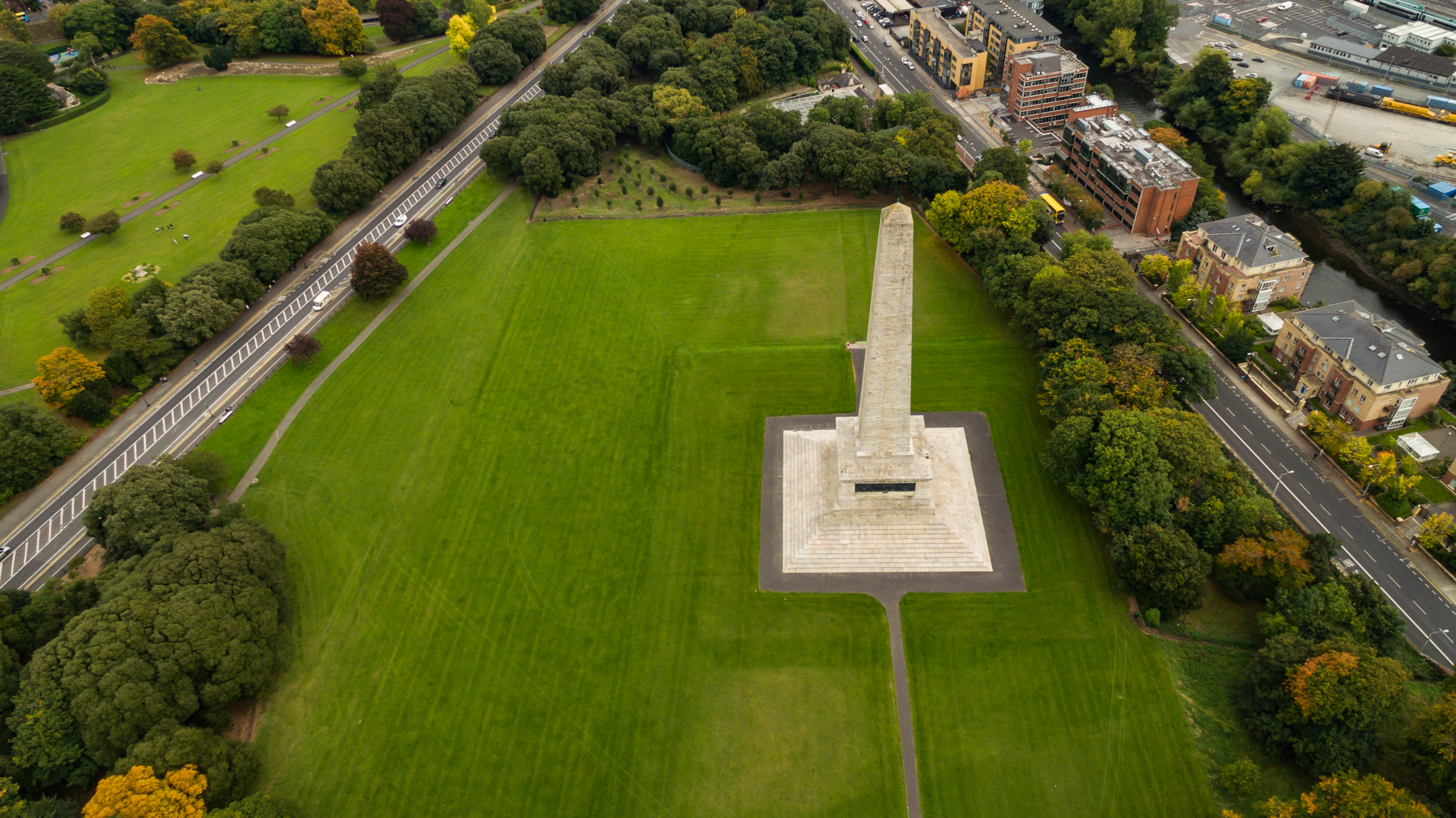
Aerial view
