= The Ragman's Ball =

Traditional Irish folk song

Song
- Genre: Irish traditional

The Ragman's Ball is a traditional Irish folk song associated with The Liberties, Dublin, an area in the capital city's inner city. The topic of the song is about a ragman that throws a party, and the various characters that attend the party.

== Notable recordings ==
- The Dubliners on their 1964 self titled debut album, and on their 1988 album, The Dubliner's Dublin.
