= Nathan Joseph =

Nathan Joseph (23 July 1939 – 30 August 2005) was a British record company founder, theatrical producer and talent agent. He was a pioneer in the development of independent record companies in the 1960s and 1970s.

Born in Birmingham, England, Joseph is best known as the founder of Transatlantic Records, an independent British record company that flourished between 1961 and 1977. Joseph started his label by importing American folk and blues recordings that were hard to obtain in the UK in the early 1960s. These were licensed for the UK from American record companies such as Folkways Records. He also released a few offbeat spoken word recordings (including a series of audio sex instruction manuals). By 1963 Joseph had started to sign and record British and Irish artists - primarily in the folk and blues spheres. The label was initially modelled on the Folkways label - and then broadened out in musical scope. Artists signed by Joseph to Transatlantic included Billy Connolly (who after beginning his career as folk singer with the Humblebums released his first comedy recordings for Transatlantic in the early 1970s), Ralph McTell, Bert Jansch, John Renbourn, Sheila Hancock and The Dubliners. He also released the first recordings by the Portsmouth Sinfonia the avant garde orchestra that included Brian Eno and Michael Nyman in its membership.

In the late 1970s, Joseph sold Transatlantic Records to the Granada Group and left the music business. He started a second career as a theatrical producer and talent agent, forming the production company, Freeshooter. Productions by Freeshooter included Sir Peter Hall's production of The Petition starring Sir John Mills, The March of the Falsettos and a revival of Godspell. As part of his work in the theatre world, he became chair of the Theatre Design Trust in Britain, which worked on theatre restoration projects.
