= Ceiliúradh =

Ceiliúradh was a celebration of Irish culture that took place in the Royal Albert Hall on 10 April 2014, to mark the state visit to London of Irish President Michael D. Higgins. It was attended by the President and Sabina Higgins, with Prince and Princess Michael of Kent representing the Royal Family.

The event was broadcast live on RTÉ, while an hour long highlights package was broadcast on BBC4 the following Sunday.

The event was promoted by Culture Ireland, and produced by South Wind Blows, an award-winning production company in association with the venue.

== Background ==
The event was designed as a tribute to thousands of Irish people who have made Britain their home. It was intended to showcase the links that exist between Ireland and the U.K. in the artistic and creative domains.

== Running order ==
The running order for the event was as follows:

- House Band with Fiona Shaw - The Exiles Jig, with reading of The Song of Wandering Angus by W B Yeats
- Joseph O'Connor - The Thrill Of It All
- Andy Irvine - My Heart's Tonight In Ireland
- Paul Brady - Nothing But The Same Old Story
- House Band with Irish dancers - Medley of tunes with dancers Caitín Nic Gabhann, Seosamh O’Neachtain, Michael Maguire and Ellie Maguire
- Conor O'Brien - My Lighthouse
- Elvis Costello with Steve Naïve and Conor O’Brien - Shipbuilding
- Olivia O'Leary - Silent O Moyle, The Minstrel Boy (joined by Fiona Shaw and West Ocean String Quartet)
- Imelda May - Kentish Town Waltz, It's Good To Be Alive
- Glen Hansard and Lisa Hannigan - Falling Slowly, The Auld Triangle (with Elvis Costello, Conor O’Brien, Paul Brady, Imelda May and John Sheahan)
- Elvis Costello - Tripwire, (What's So Funny 'Bout) Peace, Love, and Understanding
- The Gloaming - Opening Set
- Fiona Shaw - Postscript by Seamus Heaney
- All guest singers and London Irish Choir - The Parting Glass

Dermot O'Leary acted as compere for a number of the acts.

== House band ==
The house band for the event comprised a host of Ireland's top musicians.

- Liam Bradley - percussion
- John Carty - fiddle
- Aimee Farrell Courtney - bodhrán
- Anthony Drennan - guitar
- Noel Eccles - percussion
- Graham Henderson - piano
- Dónal Lunny - bouzouki and bodhrán
- Mike McGoldrick - flute and whistles
- Paul Moore - bass
- Máirtín O'Connor - accordions
- Brendan Power - harmonica
