= State visit by Elizabeth II to the Republic of Ireland =

2011 visit by the British monarch

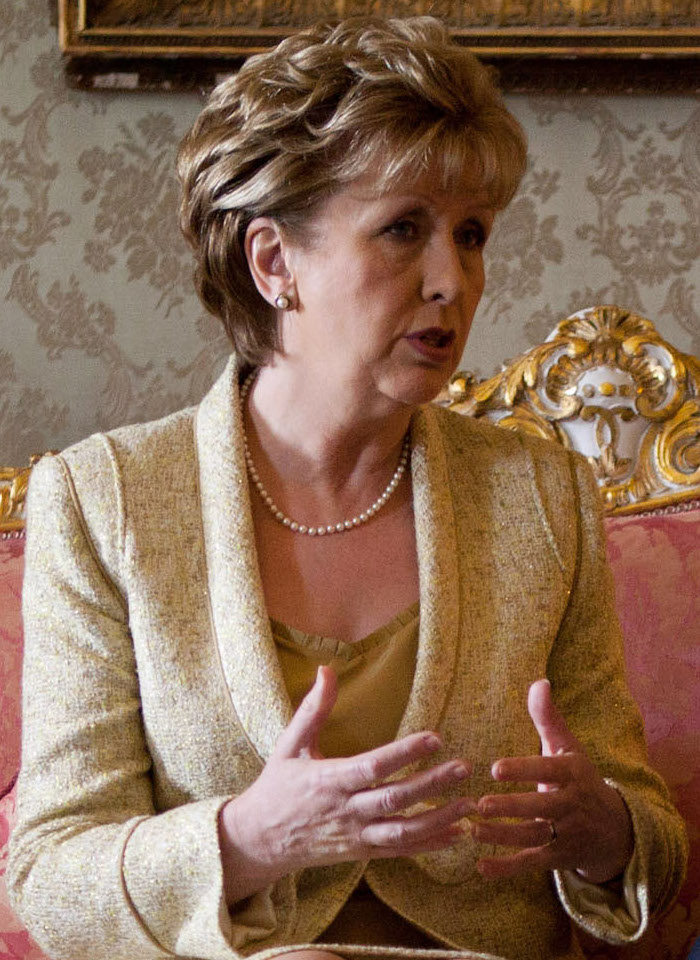
Mary McAleese

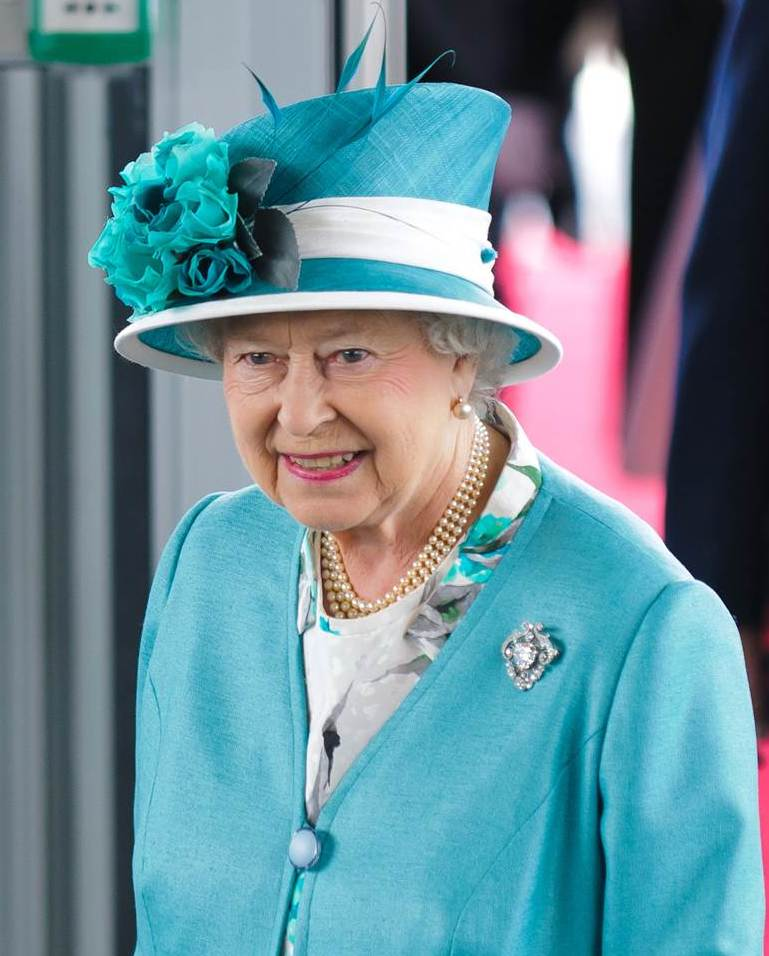
Elizabeth II

Queen Elizabeth II of the United Kingdom of Great Britain and Northern Ireland and her husband Prince Philip made a state visit to Ireland from 17 to 20 May 2011, at the invitation of the president of Ireland, Mary McAleese. It was the first visit by a reigning British monarch to the area that is now the Republic of Ireland since the 1911 tour by Elizabeth's grandfather King George V, when the entire island of Ireland was still part of the United Kingdom of Great Britain and Ireland.

The intervening period saw the 1916 proclamation of the Irish Republic during the Easter Rising against British rule in Ireland. A military conflict from January 1919 led ultimately to the partition of Ireland on 3 May 1921. Northern Ireland remained part of the United Kingdom, while the Irish Free State became a self-governing and then fully independent Dominion within the British Empire. In 1936 the Irish Free State removed all reference to the British monarchy from its Constitution – whilst retaining an ‘external association’ with the British crown – and the Commonwealth determined to continue to treat it as a member of the Commonwealth. In 1937 the Irish Free State adopted a republican constitution and renamed itself Ireland. In 1949 Ireland ended its practice of associating itself with the countries comprising the Commonwealth and the Commonwealth decided to regard it as no longer being a Commonwealth member.

The visit was seen as a symbolic normalisation of Republic of Ireland–United Kingdom relations following the signing of the 1998 Good Friday Agreement, which settled most outstanding territorial disputes between the states, including the abandonment by the Republic of its territorial claim to Northern Ireland, thereby removing a major obstacle to a royal visit. Arrangements for the visit included the largest security operation in the history of the Republic of Ireland. During the visit, the Queen visited sites of significance for Irish nationalism in Dublin, such as the Garden of Remembrance and Croke Park, scene of the 1920 Bloody Sunday massacre. She also delivered a widely praised speech on the history of relations between the two countries. The visit was criticised by Irish republican and socialist groups. Sinn Féin, Éirígí, the United Left Alliance, some independent TDs and several smaller republican and socialist groups were opposed to the visit, with protests organised at locations on the Queen's itinerary.

While the visit was notable for being the first by the Queen to the Republic, she had visited the island of Ireland on many occasions during her reign; however, her visits were always confined to Northern Ireland. She had also been personally visited in London by President Mary Robinson in May 1993 and then several times by President McAleese since 1997. In April 2014, President Michael D. Higgins reciprocated the Queen's visit when he became the first Irish president to make a state visit to the United Kingdom.

== Visit announced ==
The Queen's visit was formally announced by Buckingham Palace and Áras an Uachtaráin simultaneously on 4 March 2011. The Queen's announcement stated:

The Queen has been pleased to accept an invitation from the President of Ireland to pay a State Visit to Ireland this year. The Queen will be accompanied by The Duke of Edinburgh.

The announcement was widely expected as both governments had anticipated the visit publicly for some time. The British ambassador to Ireland, David Reddaway, had described the visit as "imminent" in 2009.

== Background ==
Queen Elizabeth II's visit came one hundred years after the last visit by a British monarch, when her grandfather, King George V, visited Kingstown (now Dún Laoghaire), Dublin, Leopardstown, and Maynooth on 8–12 July 1911, as part of his accession tour.

The visit drew comparisons to the visit of Prince Philip's uncle Lord Mountbatten in 1979, when he was killed by a Provisional IRA bombing. Sligo Mayor Matt Lyons said that the local tourist industry was still recovering from the bombing: "Mullaghmore attracted a lot of English people prior to Lord Mountbatten's murder. It took years and years for that to recover and it hasn't really recovered."

The Queen's eldest son, Charles, Prince of Wales, attended a dinner at Dublin Castle with Taoiseach John Bruton in 1995. Anne, Princess Royal, and the then Prince Andrew, Duke of York, also visited the republic between 1995 and 2010. On 19 March 2004 Prince Charles made a private visit to Lismore Castle in County Waterford, for the 60th birthday of Lord Hartington.

The Princess Royal has made several visits to the Republic of Ireland. On one visit on 17 February 2004, she met President Mary McAleese at Áras an Uachtaráin, then went to the Army Equitation School at McKee Barracks, and an award presentation at the Old Jameson Distillery in Smithfield, Dublin.

On 22 September 2001, the Duke of York, as he then was, attended a ceremony at Kinsale in County Cork to celebrate the 400th anniversary of the Battle of Kinsale. On 5 February 2007, the Duke visited Dublin to promote trade links, meeting President Mary McAleese and Taoiseach Bertie Ahern. He met John Hurley, the Governor of the Central Bank of Ireland, visited wind farm company Airtricity, and attended a dinner hosted by David Reddaway, the British ambassador.

In January 1996, just before one of his sister's visits, Prince Edward, Earl of Wessex, visited Dublin to present the Gaisce Gold Awards. On 27 August 1999, Prince Edward visited Dublin Castle with his wife Sophie, Countess of Wessex, for the world conference of the International Award Association, and met President McAleese.

When the Queen met President Mary Robinson in 1993, this was the first meeting between an Irish head of state and a British sovereign. The Duke of Edinburgh visited Dublin on 10 November 1998, his first visit to the Republic of Ireland. He arrived by RAF helicopter at Áras an Uachtaráin, and launched the Millennium Gold Encounter for Ireland's Gaisce – The President's Award. Prince Philip also visited Dublin on 26 April 2006, again for the Gaisce Awards and met Bertie Ahern.

== Initial reaction ==
=== Ireland ===
Taoiseach Enda Kenny linked the visit to the Good Friday Agreement being put into full effect. The Queen was welcomed by Irish president Mary McAleese. The First Minister of Northern Ireland and Democratic Unionist Party leader Peter Robinson said the visit was "a sign of the normalisation of relations between our two countries", while the leader of Sinn Féin, Gerry Adams, said he did not "think this is the right time for the English Queen" to visit. He further described the timing of the visit, which was to occur on the anniversary of the Dublin and Monaghan bombings as "particularly insensitive". McAleese said it was "absolutely the right moment", and described the visit as "an extraordinary moment in Irish history". An opinion poll conducted shortly before the visit showed that it had the support of 77% of the Irish people. Adams later expressed a more conciliatory tone toward the visit: "I want to see a real and meaningfully new and better relationship between the peoples of Ireland and Britain.... The visit by the Queen of England provides a unique opportunity for the British establishment to make it clear that this is its intention also." Martin McGuinness, the Sinn Féin deputy First Minister of Northern Ireland, declined invitations to attend ceremonies at the Garden of Remembrance and the National War Memorial Gardens at Islandbridge, saying the royal visit was "premature".

However, the cost of the visit was a cause for concern for some. Socialist Party TD Joe Higgins asked in Dáil Éireann if "the Queen of England might be politely asked to contribute to the cost of her bed & breakfast during her visit to Ireland," observing that "the Irish people needed the financial help since they could soon be – metaphorically speaking – sleeping rough, as the country faced bankruptcy to pay off the debts of German and French banks which had recklessly gambled and lost in the Irish property bubble". According to Richard Boyd Barrett TD, the total cost of the visit was approximately €30 million (US$42 million, GB £26 million).

=== United Kingdom ===
British Prime Minister David Cameron described the visit as "a huge step forward" for diplomatic relations between the two countries, while former prime minister Sir John Major also rejected Gerry Adams's criticism that the visit was premature, saying that the visit put "a seal on the past and builds for the future", and that there had not been "anything of equivalent significance in the last few decades".

=== Security ===
The Queen's visit led to a number of threats of violence being issued. The Gardaí borrowed two water cannons from the Police Service of Northern Ireland to deal with any potential instances of public disorder. According to Scotland Yard, dissident Irish republicans issued a bomb threat regarding London on the eve of the visit. It was the first coded warning issued outside Northern Ireland in a decade, and the threat was made from an Irish telephone number. However, the threat did not change the Irish terrorism threat level in Britain, which remained at "substantial". There was also a terror alert in Dublin on the eve of the visit. A pipe bomb was found on a Dublin-bound bus in Maynooth, County Kildare and made safe after a warning call was made to the Gardaí. A second suspect package was found in Dublin on the first day of the visit, but was declared a hoax after being examined. On 17 May, bomb scares were reported in the Dublin suburbs of Inchicore and Fairview.

Former Garda Commissioner Martin Callinan revealed in April 2014 that members of the Irish Republican Army had intended to kill the Queen, and arrests were made. An explosive device was found in Dorset Street, close to the Garden of Remembrance. Even during the Queen's flight from London, doubts arose about whether it was safe for her to land in Ireland, and British Prime Minister David Cameron held an urgent meeting in the situation room in Downing Street in response, while she was airborne.

=== Media coverage ===
The visit was covered extensively by Raidió Teilifís Éireann (RTÉ) and TV3. RTÉ broadcast the events on television, radio and the internet. The Queen and Us, a special documentary by Tommie Gorman, was broadcast on the night of 17 May at the end of the first day of the visit.

The visit was marked with the broadcast of several documentaries, including:

- Forbidden Love: The Royals, narrated by Rosaleen Linehan on RTÉ
- The Queen and Us, presented by Tommie Gorman on RTÉ
- The Queen in Ireland, a BBC News special

The BBC, Sky News, CNN, France 24, Xinhua News Agency and ITAR-TASS were among the foreign media to cover events. Nearly 12,000 newspaper articles were produced and nearly 1,400 news clips were shown on television internationally.

RTÉ One broadcast a special programme over the following Christmas season, The Queen's Speech, recalling the visit.

== Itinerary ==
Though the Queen made several public appearances, onlookers remained at a distance behind security barriers most of the time. On the final day of her visit, she greeted members of the public on a short walkabout on a street in Cork. Earlier, she met with some members of the public who were carefully selected in advance.

For the three nights of her visit, the Queen stayed at Farmleigh, the State Guest House in the Phoenix Park.

There were ten people in the British delegation.

=== Day 1 (17 May) ===
External videos
- The Queen with Captain Tom Holmes inspecting the Guard Of Honour in Ireland
- Queen Elizabeth at Áras an Uachtaráin, British National Anthem

The Queen arrived in Ireland, flying into Casement Aerodrome with the Duke of Edinburgh. She landed on schedule, "almost exactly at noon". Tánaiste and Minister for Foreign Affairs Eamon Gilmore greeted her and her party when they got off the plane. The Queen wore a Stewart Parvin jade green dress and coat accompanied by a Rachel Trevor-Morgan hat, and a young girl named Rachel Fox from Shankill in Dublin gave her a bouquet of flowers.

Following her arrival, she was driven to Áras an Uachtaráin, the residence of the President of Ireland in the Phoenix Park, where she was welcomed by President McAleese and her husband, Martin. The Queen and Prince Philip then signed the guestbook. While there, she also inspected a guard of honour of the Defence Forces accompanied by guard commander Captain Thomas Holmes (5th Infantry Battalion, Irish Army). A 21-gun salute was fired in the background. Before lunch at the Áras, she planted an oak tree beside the Peace Bell in the garden.

After changing clothes, she travelled to the Garden of Remembrance where she was greeted by the Minister for Justice and Defence, Alan Shatter. She and President McAleese each laid a wreath, and the Queen bowed to honour those who died for Irish independence. She departed for Trinity College Library, where she viewed the ninth-century Book of Kells and the 15th-century Trinity College harp, and shook hands with many academics. She then retired to Farmleigh for a private evening.

The published schedule said she would arrive at Áras an Uachtaráin at 12:30, the Garden of Remembrance at 15:15 and Trinity College at 15:40.

=== Day 2 (18 May) ===
The Queen visited the Guinness Storehouse, Government Buildings, and the National War Memorial Gardens, where she also laid a wreath, before having a private lunch at Farmleigh. Among those who were invited to attend the National War Memorial ceremony were leaders of the Ulster Defence Association, which caused some controversy.

She also visited the Croke Park sports stadium, which was the site of the shooting of football spectators by British forces in 1920. Some Gaelic Athletic Association officials were reported to have declined to attend the Croke Park event, although Christy Cooney, president of the GAA, welcomed the Queen, saying "Your Majesty, on behalf of the members of the Gaelic Athletic Association throughout Ireland and across the world, I am delighted to welcome you to our headquarters at Croke Park". The Queen was introduced to four inter-county Gaelic football and hurling players, and presented with an original Offaly hurley.

==== Speech at Dublin Castle ====
A state dinner in honour of the Queen took place in the evening at Dublin Castle. Following a speech and toast by President McAleese, the Queen delivered a speech on relations between Ireland and the United Kingdom. The content of the speech, which was written by the Queen and her deputy private secretary, drew widespread praise from the Irish media and from politicians, including Sinn Féin President Gerry Adams. The Queen began her speech by speaking in Irish: "A Uachtaráin, agus a chairde" she said — "President and friends" which caused President McAleese to turn to others at the table and say "Wow" three times. The Queen noted the progress made in the Northern Ireland peace process adding, "What were once only hopes for the future have now come to pass; it is almost exactly 13 years since the overwhelming majority of people in Ireland and Northern Ireland voted in favour of the agreement signed on Good Friday 1998, paving the way for Northern Ireland to become the exciting and inspirational place that it is today."

=== Day 3 (19 May) ===
The Queen toured the Irish National Stud in Tully, County Kildare for about half an hour. Afterwards, she visited the Aga Khan's Gilltown stud south of Kilcullen in County Kildare. She lunched with the Aga Khan, his family, and other guests. In the evening, she attended the National Convention Centre in Dublin for a British Embassy party, at which the Queen hosted the President. The best of Irish and British fashion were on show, and there was a 45 minute concert including performances by The Chieftains, Westlife, and Riverdance, compered by broadcaster Gay Byrne. The British Ambassador, Julian King, announced that "The Queen and The Duke of Edinburgh, together with President McAleese and two thousand invited guests from across Ireland, will experience the best of Irish music, dance, theatre and fashion in a unique event to mark the visit." The Queen was greeted by long applause and a standing ovation after she made her way onto the stage at the end of the concert.

=== Day 4 (20 May) ===
The Queen visited the Rock of Cashel in Cashel, County Tipperary, on her way to Cork, where the Sinn Féin Mayor of Cashel, Michael Browne, welcomed her and shook her hand.

After Cashel, she visited Coolmore Stud, the world's largest horse-breeding operation, in Fethard, County Tipperary. She has sent mares to be bred at the stud over the years. Following a tour of the facility, she dined with John Magnier and horse-racing industry notables, as well as other guests who have not been identified.

While in Cork, the Queen visited the city's English Market on Princes Street after which she made unscheduled walkabout along the Grand Parade, greeting members of the public in the street, before going to Tyndall National Institute, a research centre which is part of University College Cork. She left the country from Cork Airport in the late afternoon.

== Protests ==
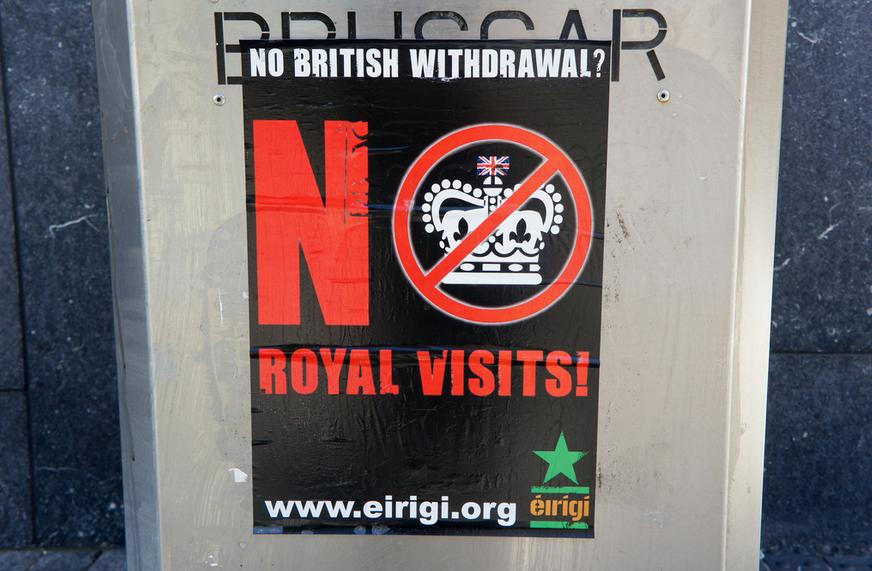
A poster in Cork protesting against the visit.

The Irish Anti-War Movement (IAWM) held a peaceful protest against the royal visit at 18:30 on 17 May at the General Post Office (GPO) on O'Connell Street, Dublin, featuring former British soldiers and relatives of one British soldier killed in Afghanistan. Around 100 people attended to protest the presence of British Crown forces in Afghanistan and Iraq. A protest and wreath laying ceremony by the socialist Republican party Éirígí on Dublin's Moore Street passed off peacefully. A protest by Republican Sinn Féin and the 32 County Sovereignty Movement on the corner of Dorset Street and Hardwicke Street led to jostling with the Gardaí, and some balloons were released into the air.

On 18 May, a small protest organised by Republican Sinn Féin occurred peacefully near Croke Park during the Queen's visit to the stadium. During her visit to Dublin Castle, protests near Christ Church Cathedral organised by groups such as Éirígí and the 32 County Sovereignty Movement included hundreds of people, of whom eight were arrested.

== Legacy ==
It was announced in June 2012 that Sinn Féin's Martin McGuinness, the deputy first minister of Northern Ireland, would meet and shake hands with the Queen on a royal visit to the province. The Queen's visit to the Republic, widely seen as being successful, was mentioned by some as a factor in Sinn Féin's decision to meet the Queen. Lord Empey, chairman of the Ulster Unionist Party, noted that Sinn Féin's refusal to meet the Queen in Dublin resulted in a negative public reaction, and said a meeting was inevitable as a result, while Sinn Féin's Gerry Adams said the meeting would be "the right thing to do at the right time and for the right reasons."

The major legacy of the visit was that it set the scene for the state visit of the President of Ireland to the United Kingdom in 2014.
