= State visit by Michael D. Higgins to the United Kingdom =

2014 visit by the head of state of Ireland

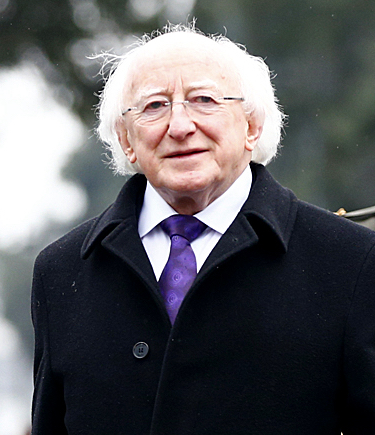
Michael D. Higgins in 2014

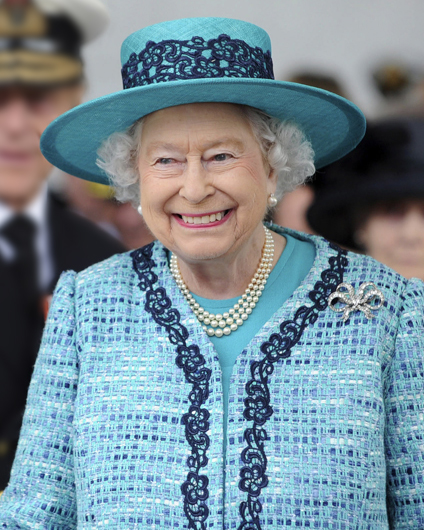
Elizabeth II in 2014

Michael D. Higgins paid the first state visit of a president of Ireland to the United Kingdom on 7 April 2014. The visit came three years after the first state visit by a reigning British monarch to what is now the Republic of Ireland following its independence.

President Michael D. Higgins and his wife Sabina Higgins were welcomed by Queen Elizabeth II on 8 April at Windsor Castle on the first day of a four-day visit. The President attended a formal meeting with Prime Minister David Cameron on the same day.

He also met opposition party leaders at Westminster, as well as meeting then-Mayor of London Boris Johnson.

== Programme ==
=== Departure (7 April) ===
President and Mrs Higgins left Áras an Uachtaráin with full military honours at 2.30pm. A Guard of Honour was provided by the 12th Infantry Battalion, and the Army No. 1 Band played the Presidential Salute. The President was accompanied by a motorcycle Escort of Honour to Baldonnel Aerodrome where he departed at 4pm for Heathrow Airport.

The party was greeted on arrival after 5pm by the Ambassador of Ireland to the United Kingdom, Daniel Mulhall, and his wife Greta; The 8th Viscount Hood, Lord-in-Waiting to the Queen; Sir David Brewer, Lord-Lieutenant of Greater London; and Sir Bernard Hogan-Howe, Commissioner of the Metropolitan Police. Members of the Queen's Colour Squadron of the Royal Air Force provided a guard of honour.

Tánaiste and Foreign Minister Eamon Gilmore and his wife Carol Hanney also travelled with the President. The Irish delegation included the Secretary General to the President, Adrian O'Neill; Secretary General to the Government, Martin Fraser; Department of Foreign Affairs Secretary General, David Cooney; the President's chief of protocol, Orla O'Hanrahan; adviser, Liam Herrick; and the President's aide-de-camp, Colonel Brendan McAndrew. The President spent the night at the Kensington Hotel, in South Kensington.

=== Day 1 (8 April) ===
The formal State Visit began the following morning when the President and Foreign Minister met Charles, Prince of Wales, and Camilla, Duchess of Cornwall, at the Irish Embassy.

The Irish and British parties then travelled together in royal limousines to the Royal Dais on Datchet Road, Windsor, where the town was decked with Tricolours and Union Flags and a formal ceremony of welcome was conducted by Queen Elizabeth and Prince Philip, Duke of Edinburgh. Afterwards, the royal party and visitors departed in horse-drawn carriages with full cavalry escort to Windsor Castle, where the President, accompanied by the Duke of Edinburgh, inspected a Guard of Honour provided by the 1st Battalion, Irish Guards. President Higgins presented a ceremonial red coat to its regimental mascot, an Irish Wolfhound called Domhnall of Shantamon. The President viewed Irish-related items from The Royal Collection at Windsor Castle.

Afterwards they departed for London and visited Westminster Abbey for a tour, where the President laid a wreath at the Grave of the Unknown Warrior and paid his respects with a bow to the tomb of Admiral of the Fleet The 1st Earl Mountbatten of Burma. After this the President visited the Palace of Westminster, where he addressed both Houses of Parliament.

In the evening, the President and Mrs. Higgins were guests of honour at a State Banquet hosted by the Queen at Windsor Castle along with 160 guests. The Queen made a speech before dinner and President Higgins replied, and proposed a toast to Her Majesty. Higgins and his wife were honoured as guests of the Queen at Windsor Castle for the remainder of their visit.

=== Day 2 (9 April) ===
The following morning, the President and Mrs. Higgins were escorted by the Duke of York to the Grand Stairs in Windsor Castle to view the Colours of the 1922 disbanded Irish Regiments. The President and his wife visited University College Hospital on Euston Road in Bloomsbury, and met with patients and Irish staff members, past and present. Later, President Higgins met David Cameron, Prime Minister of the United Kingdom, for lunch at 10 Downing Street. Afterwards, the President and Mrs. Higgins attended a Banquet hosted by Fiona Woolf, Lord Mayor of London, and the City of London Corporation at the Guildhall. After dinner, the President addressed the 700 invited guests.

=== Day 3 (10 April) ===
The President and Mrs. Higgins visited the Food Animal Initiative (FAI) Farms, in Oxford. In the early evening, the President attended a Northern Ireland-themed reception hosted by the Queen at Windsor Castle. A concert celebrating Irish music and culture was held in his honour at the Royal Albert Hall that night, which he attended along with One Direction's Niall Horan.

=== Day 4 (11 April) ===
On the morning of the final day of the visit, the President and Mrs. Higgins said farewell to the Queen and the Duke of Edinburgh at Windsor Castle. Later that morning they visited the Royal Shakespeare Company, in Stratford-upon-Avon. The President and his wife also visited Coventry Cathedral and took a tour of the ruins of the old Cathedral. The final event of the visit was a reception for members of the Irish community at St. Mary's Guildhall before the President departed from Coventry for Dublin.
