= Steward's Lodge =

Residence of Taoiseach of Ireland

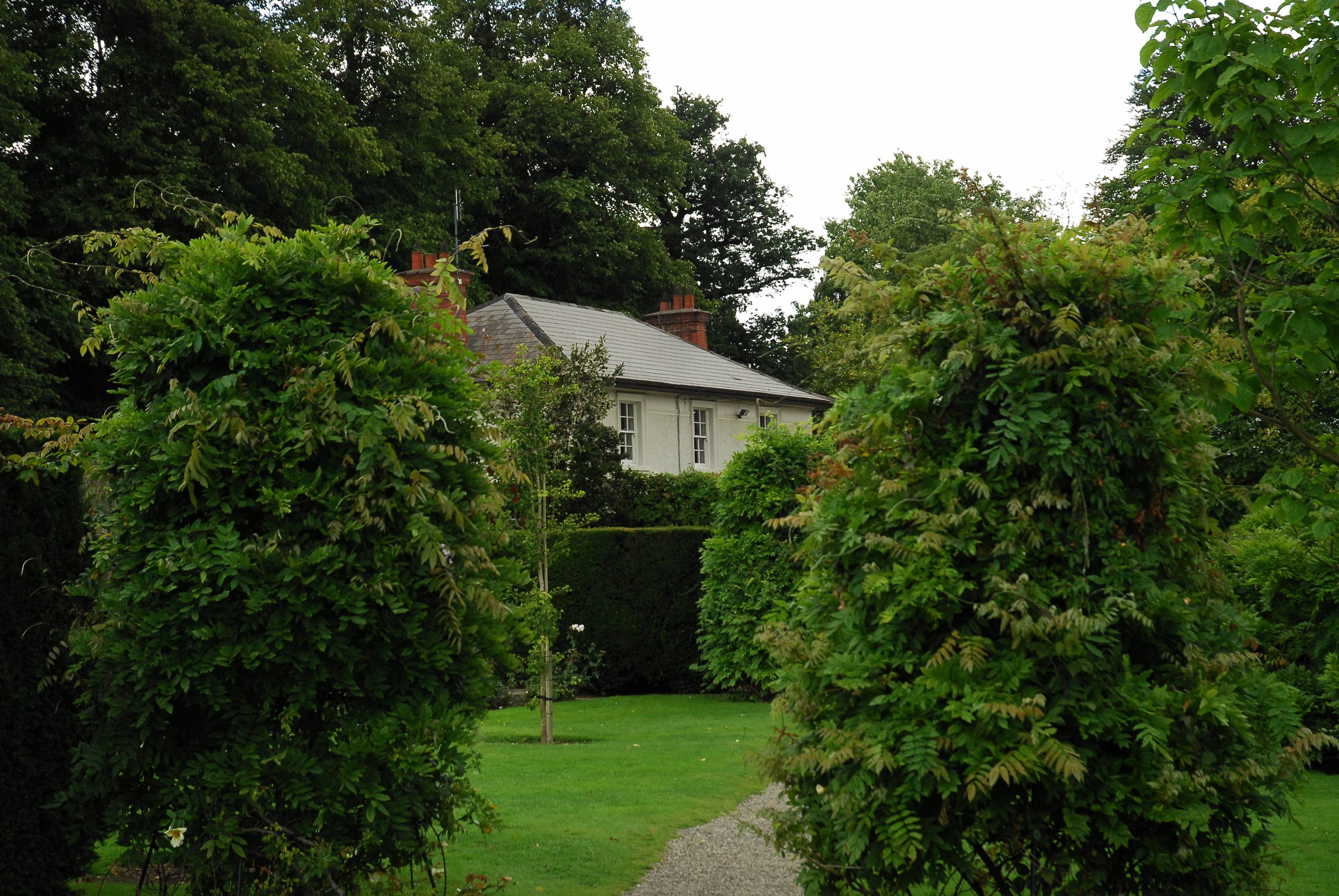
- View into Steward's Lodge grounds

- Location within Dublin

General information
- Location: Phoenix Park, Dublin, Ireland
- Coordinates: 53.36619°N 6.35802°W
- Current tenants: Taoiseach
- Renovated: 2006
- Renovation cost: €600,000
- Owner: Government of Ireland

Technical details
- Floor count: 2

The Steward's Lodge is a house which was originally part of the Farmleigh estate, alongside the Phoenix Park in Dublin. It is sometimes used as a residence by the taoiseach of Ireland.

== History ==
=== Origins ===
The Steward's Lodge was originally built in the grounds of Farmleigh house – an 18th-century estate which was formerly owned by members of the Guinness family. Originally accessible within the grounds of the estate, the lodge was subsequently separated from Farmleigh during refurbishment works.

=== Taoiseach's residence ===
There is no official residence of the taoiseach, with each taoiseach residing in either their own homes, or in an apartment in Dublin. In the 1970s, plans were made to turn the former Apostolic Nunciature (formerly the Under Secretary's Lodge) in the Phoenix Park into an official residence. However, the plans fell through and the Georgian building was subsequently demolished.

In 2006, it was announced by the Office of Public Works that the Steward's Lodge had been renovated, at a cost of nearly €600,000. It was speculated that the house would become the official private residence of the taoiseach after the 2007 general election, and any official engagements would be carried out in the nearby Farmleigh or Government Buildings.

There was political sensitivity at government level about the project, with some concerned that it could be depicted as a lavish "perk" for the taoiseach. In 2005, a spokeswoman for Bertie Ahern stated he had no interest in using it, and he remained resident in his private home in Drumcondra in Dublin. In 2008, it was reported that Brian Cowen might use it as his official residence. Media reports suggest that Garda concerns for the taoiseach's security precluded him from continuing to reside in his own Dublin home in the city centre. Cowen did not formally reside in the Steward's Lodge, preferring to return to his family home in County Offaly, but he did use it "from time to time". In 2011, it was reported that the then taoiseach, Enda Kenny, would make use of the residence, however he used it very rarely. Former taoiseach Leo Varadkar resided in his private apartment in Castleknock, but used the Lodge for occasional parties at his own expense. During the COVID-19 pandemic in the Republic of Ireland it was used as a residence by Varadkar due to its teleconferencing facilities.

In July 2024, it was reported that government security advisors were insisting that the taoiseach and his family move into Steward's Lodge for their security, following a number of anti-immigration disturbances and an increase in the number of attacks on politicians internationally.
