= Michael D. Higgins =

President of Ireland from 2011 to 2025

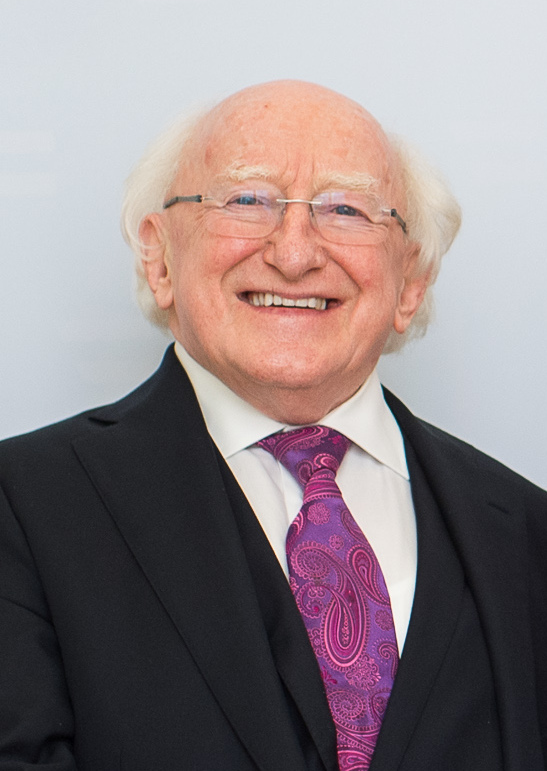
- Higgins in 2022

President of Ireland
- In office 11 November 2011 – 10 November 2025
- Taoiseach: Enda Kenny; Leo Varadkar; Micheál Martin; Simon Harris
- Preceded by: Mary McAleese
- Succeeded by: Catherine Connolly

Minister for Arts, Culture and the Gaeltacht
- In office 15 December 1994 – 26 June 1997
- Taoiseach: John Bruton
- Preceded by: Bertie Ahern
- Succeeded by: Síle de Valera
- In office 12 January 1993 – 17 November 1994
- Taoiseach: Albert Reynolds
- Preceded by: John Wilson
- Succeeded by: Bertie Ahern

Mayor of Galway
- In office 21 July 1990 – 3 May 1991
- Preceded by: Angela Lynch-Lupton
- Succeeded by: Michael Leahy
- In office 12 December 1981 – 29 November 1982
- Preceded by: Claude Toft
- Succeeded by: Pat McNamara

Teachta Dála
- In office February 1987 – February 2011
- Constituency: Galway West
- In office June 1981 – November 1982
- Constituency: Galway West

Senator
- In office 23 February 1983 – 3 April 1987
- Constituency: National University
- In office 1 June 1973 – 26 May 1977
- Constituency: Nominated by the Taoiseach

Personal details
- Born: Michael Daniel Higgins; 18 April 1941 (age 85) Limerick, Ireland
- Party: Independent (since 2011)
- Other political affiliations: Fianna Fáil (before 1968); Labour (1968–2011)
- Spouse: Sabina Coyne (m. 1974)
- Children: 4, including Alice-Mary
- Education: University College Galway; Indiana University; University of Manchester
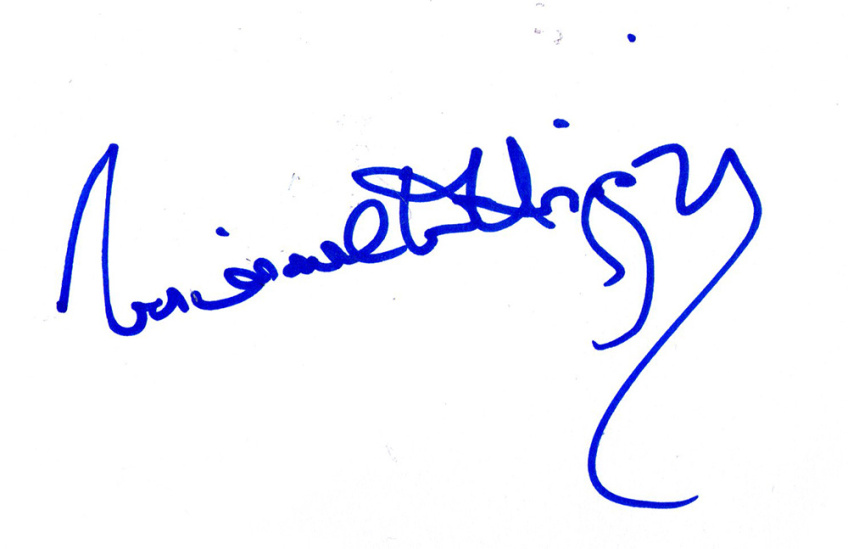
- Signature
- Website: Personal website

Michael Daniel Higgins (Irish: Mícheál Dónal Ó hUigínn; born 18 April 1941) is an Irish politician, poet and broadcaster who served as the president of Ireland from November 2011 to November 2025. Entering national politics through the Labour Party, he served as a senator from 1973 to 1977 and a Teachta Dála (TD) from 1981 to 1982, returning to the Seanad from 1983 to 1987 and the Dáil from 1987 to 2011. He served as minister for arts, culture and the Gaeltacht from 1993 to 1997 and as mayor of Galway from 1981 to 1982 and 1990 to 1991.

Higgins was elected president of Ireland in 2011 after being nominated by the Labour Party. He ran for a second term in 2018 and was re-elected in a landslide victory, with his 822,566 first-preference votes being the largest personal mandate in the history of the Republic of Ireland until Catherine Connolly's election as president in 2025. His second presidential inauguration took place on 11 November 2018.

Higgins used his presidency to address issues concerning justice, social equality, social inclusion, anti-sectarianism, anti-racism, and reconciliation. He made the first state visit by an Irish president to the United Kingdom in April 2014.

== Early life ==
Michael Daniel Higgins was born on 18 April 1941 in Limerick. His father, John Higgins, was from Ballycar, County Clare, and was a lieutenant with the Charleville Company, 3rd Battalion, 2nd Cork Brigade of the Irish Republican Army. John, along with his two brothers Peter and Michael, had been active participants in the Irish War of Independence.

When John's father's health grew poor, with alcohol abuse as a contributing factor, John sent Michael, aged five, and his four-year-old brother to live on his unmarried uncle and aunt's farm near Newmarket-on-Fergus, County Clare. His elder twin sisters remained in Limerick. He was educated at Ballycar National School, County Clare and St. Flannan's College, Ennis.

As an undergraduate at University College Galway (UCG), he served as vice-auditor of the college's Literary and Debating Society in 1963–64, and rose to the position of auditor in the 1964–65 academic year. He also served as president of UCG Students' Union in 1964–65. In 1967, Higgins graduated from the American Indiana University Bloomington with a Master of Arts degree in sociology. He also briefly attended the University of Manchester.

In his academic career, Higgins was a statutory lecturer in the Department of Political Science and Sociology at UCG and was a visiting professor at Southern Illinois University. He resigned his academic posts to concentrate fully on his political career.

Higgins is a fluent Irish language speaker and also speaks Spanish.

== Political career (1973–2011) ==
=== Seanad and Dáil Éireann (1973 to 1993) ===
Higgins originally joined Fianna Fáil in UCG while a mature student and was elected its branch chairman in 1966; he switched to the Labour Party shortly thereafter. He was a Labour candidate in the 1969 and 1973 general elections but was unsuccessful on both occasions. One of the people who canvassed for him was future leader of the Labour Party and Tánaiste, Eamon Gilmore, who was then a UCG student. Higgins was appointed to the 13th Seanad in 1973 by Taoiseach Liam Cosgrave.

Although placed in the Seanad by Fine Gael's Cosgrove, early in his career, Higgins quickly established a reputation as a "leftist firebrand" who opposed Labour going into coalition with Fine Gael. Higgins, alongside Emmet Stagg and Joe Higgins, were considered the main opponents of coalition within Labour following the departure of Noel Browne over the issue in 1977. During the 1980s Higgins involved himself in foreign affairs issues such as Nicaragua, El Salvador, and Cambodia.

Higgins also involved himself in issues such as equal pay for women and the rights of people with disabilities.

Higgins was first elected to Dáil Éireann at the 1981 general election as a Labour Party TD. He was re-elected at the February 1982 election; he lost his seat at the November 1982 election (blaming his loss in part on his opposition to the Eighth Amendment), but returned to the Seanad when he was elected by the National University constituency. After returning to the Seanad in 1983, he helped found the Oireachtas Foreign Affairs Committee and served as the Labour Party's spokesperson on foreign affairs. Speaking about Higgins' interest in foreign affairs, former Labour leader Frank Cluskey once quipped: "When it comes to running the Labour Party or saving the world, Michael D always chooses the easy option."

In 1982 Higgins began writing a regular column for Hot Press, something that would continue until 1992. The columns covered major issues of the time, including opposition to the Eighth Amendment, the campaign for divorce legalisation, critiques of US foreign policy, the Enniskillen bombing, and observations on Irish and international affairs. Higgins also tackled broader social issues like patriarchy and economic inequality, with a focus on marginalised communities.

It was also in 1982 that Higgins became Mayor of Galway for the first time.

In early 1982, Michael D. Higgins visited El Salvador to investigate reports of the El Mozote massacre, where over 1,000 civilians were killed by government forces. Initially deported by the army, Higgins later gained access and, along with Trócaire, helped expose what had occurred. His efforts, including contacting major U.S. newspapers like the New York Times and the Washington Post, sparked international outrage and congressional hearings in the US. Higgins faced criticism but persisted in highlighting human rights abuses, aiding in El Salvador's peace process by advocating recognition of the FMLN as a legitimate political force.

In June 1984, Higgins protested against US President Ronald Reagan speaking at University College Galway. Higgins criticised the US government for supporting the Contras in Nicaragua, opposing its stance toward the country's democratically elected left-wing government.

Higgins returned to the Dáil at the 1987 general election and held his seat until the 2011 general election.

In 1989, Higgins and Stagg voted against the expulsion of the "Militant Labour" faction within Labour (led by Joe Higgins) after the faction was accused of being entrist Trotskyites. The measure passed and members of Militant Labour subsequently formed the Trotskyist Socialist Party.

In 1991, Higgins became Mayor of Galway for a second time.

=== Minister for Arts, Culture and the Gaeltacht (1993 to 1997) ===
When the Fianna Fáil–Labour coalition came into office in 1993 under Taoiseach Albert Reynolds, Higgins, who had long challenged every Labour leader and opposed coalition arrangements, was appointed Ireland's first Minister for Arts, Culture and the Gaeltacht. Although some accused him of compromising his principles, Higgins argued that Fianna Fáil, unlike Fine Gael, was a party rooted in "na gnáth-daoine" (the ordinary people). Higgins felt comfortable with Fianna Fáil's self-declared left-of-centre stance and their republican ideals.

During his period as minister, Higgins re-established the Irish Film Board and set up the Irish language television station, Teilifís na Gaeilge (later renamed TG4). Higgins also repealed Section 31 of the Broadcasting Act, which had banned Sinn Féin from appearing on Irish media. This decision allowed Sinn Féin voices on air months before the Provisional IRA began a ceasefire in 1994, and it drew attention even in UK government circles. Tánaiste Dick Spring defended Higgins's decision, citing civil liberties concerns and pointing to Sinn Féin's low public support in the Republic. He also suggested that media exposure would subject Sinn Féin to greater scrutiny.

Higgins's stint as minister also saw him initiate a network of local arts venues and community cultural centres across Ireland. In addition, his department spearheaded a major inland waterways restoration program. Under this policy, Ireland's canal network was extensively rehabilitated: over 1,000 km of waterways were made navigable, creating jobs and tourism revenue in rural areas.

=== Post-Ministerial career (1997 to 2011) ===
Higgins was appointed to the Labour Party front bench in 2000. In 2003, Higgins succeeded Proinsias De Rossa in the symbolic position of the president of the Labour Party, while continuing as the party's spokesman on foreign affairs.

In January 2003, Higgins was actively involved in efforts to prevent the Iraq War. He met with Iraq's Deputy Prime Minister, Tariq Aziz, and proposed a peace plan to help avoid conflict. Higgins expressed deep concern about the devastating effects of war on Iraq's civilians, particularly women and children, citing the horrors of 1991's Gulf War. He warned against the destruction of essential infrastructure, which violated international laws. Higgins believed Ireland could play a role in peace efforts, but he accused the Irish government of lacking a clear position, which undermined the country's neutrality. He also condemned the aggressive U.S. foreign policy under figures like Donald Rumsfeld and denounced the use of religious justification for war. While he opposed Saddam Hussein's regime, he stressed that war was not the solution and that a civil society in Iraq could only be achieved through non-violent means. In February, Higgins was a prominent figure in the anti-Iraq War protests in Dublin, where around 100,000 people gathered to voice their opposition to the invasion of Iraq. The rally began at the Garden of Remembrance, with Higgins addressing the crowd. Higgins joined others in urging the Irish government not to allow Shannon Airport to be used by U.S. troops en route to the Gulf.

In September 2004, as Labour Party spokesman on foreign affairs, Higgins was contacted by Paul Bigley, the brother of British hostage Kenneth Bigley, who was being held in Iraq. Higgins reached out to Palestinian leader Yasser Arafat through his representatives in Dublin, and brought up Bigley's Irish heritage and Ireland's neutral stance on the Iraq war. Arafat instructed his officials to lobby Iraqi political factions for Bigley's release. Higgins also appeared on Al Jazeera to appeal to the captors and offered to travel to Iraq to assist in negotiations. Despite these efforts, Bigley was executed by his captors.

Higgins indicated his interest in contesting the 2004 presidential election for the Labour Party. The party decided on 16 September 2004 against running a candidate in the election, seeing Mary McAleese as unbeatable.

In August 2005, Higgins took part in a European fact-finding trip to Israel and Palestine, organised by United Civilians for Peace. The aim was to assess the situation after Israel pulled out of Gaza. Over a week, they visited Jerusalem, Ramallah, Bethlehem, Hebron, and Gaza. The group met with Israeli and Palestinian politicians, mayors from various towns, and representatives from NGOs and civil society groups, as well as diplomats from the countries involved in the delegation.

In October 2010, he announced he would not be standing at the 2011 general election. He had until this point been living in a two-bed apartment at Grattan Hall on Mount Street, Dublin. He also has a family home in Galway.

=== 2011 presidential campaign ===
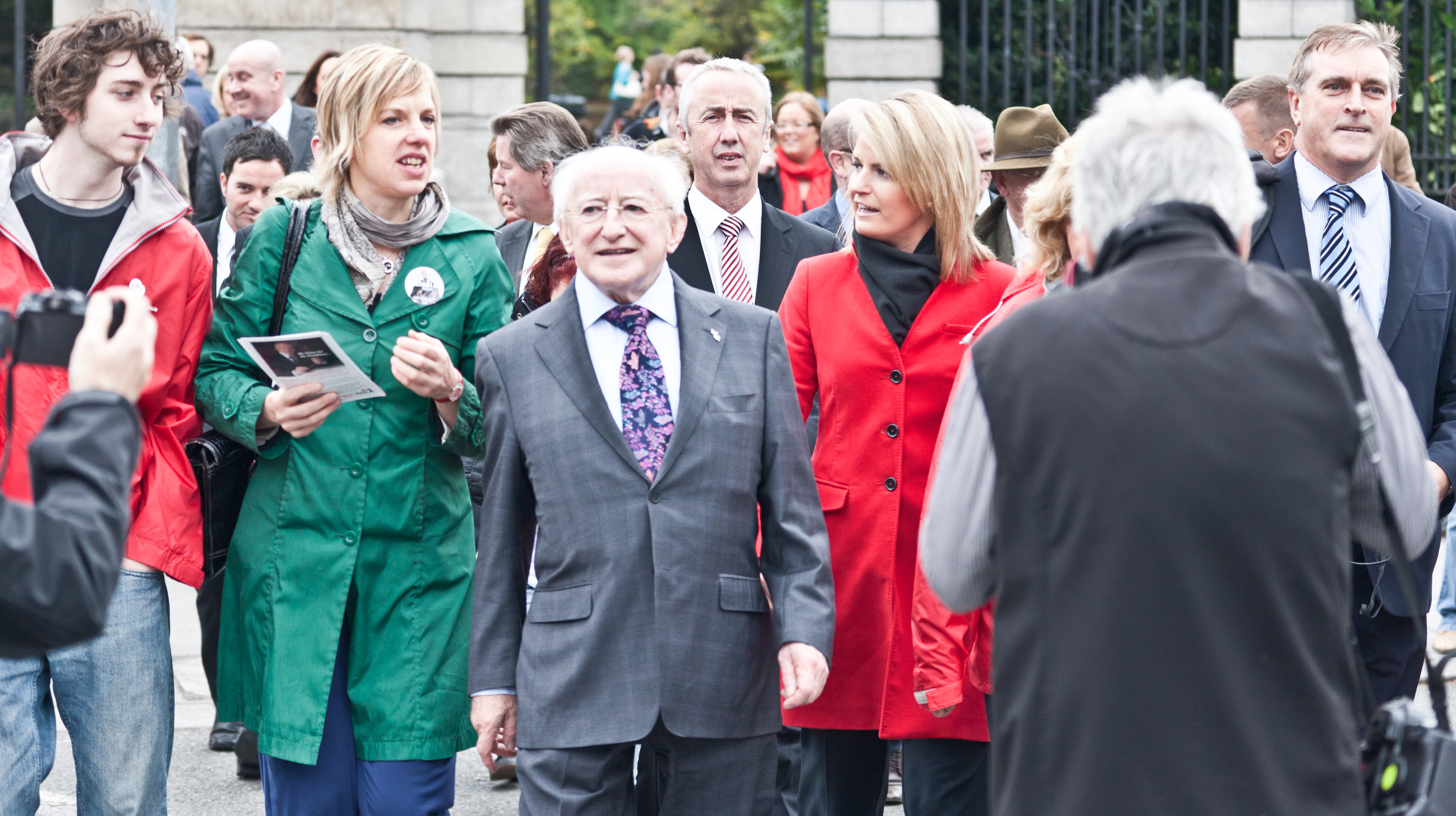
Higgins and Ivana Bacik campaigning during the 2011 presidential race

In September 2010, Higgins indicated that he was interested in receiving the Labour Party's nomination for the 2011 presidential election. He said prior to and during the election campaign that he would serve only one seven-year term as president, and not seeking a second term of office if elected.

He was selected as a candidate for the presidency at a convention in Dublin on 19 June 2011, beating former senator Kathleen O'Meara and former party adviser Fergus Finlay. His candidacy was endorsed by Hollywood actor Martin Sheen, who described Higgins as a "dear friend". Higgins assisted his rival David Norris by urging his party colleagues on Dublin City Council "in the interests of democracy" not to obstruct Norris's attempts to get onto the ballot at the last moment, adding that the nomination criteria were "outdated".

Higgins was confronted by former Tara mines workers while canvassing in County Meath. The workers were upset about their pensions being cut. Higgins was also pursued by his past links to Fianna Fáil, and admitted on 13 October that he had been elected chairman of the UCG Fianna Fáil university cumann in 1966. He admitted that he had smoked marijuana while at university in the United States. However, media reports said he was "spared the intense grilling Miriam O'Callaghan meted out to some of the others" during the Prime Time debate. Higgins promised he would be a neutral president if elected and not be a "handmaiden" to the government. The Labour Party's budget for the campaign was within €320,000.

On 29 October 2011, two days after the presidential election was held, Higgins was declared the winner with a total of 1,007,104 votes, far more than any Irish politician in the history of the republic. Thousands of people lined the streets of Galway to welcome him home the following day. International media coverage of his win reported his humble background, poetry and intellect, with The Washington Post noting "local satirists sometimes depict him as an elf, hobbit or leprechaun talking in riddles and verse". He is the first president of Ireland to have served in both Houses of the Oireachtas, having previously been a member of Dáil Éireann and Seanad Éireann.

Before his inauguration, Higgins and his family met his predecessor Mary McAleese and her husband Martin for lunch at Áras an Uachtaráin on 3 November. That night, he presented an award to Niall Tóibín, and received his own standing ovation as he entered the Irish Film Institute. On 5 November, he attended an important football game, featuring Galway United versus Monaghan United in the second leg in the League of Ireland promotion/relegation play-off at Terryland Park, wrapped in the scarf of his favourite team, and being greeted by a large banner hanging from a stand declaring "Welcome home to Galway, Mr President".

=== Dáil election results ===
Elections to the Dáil
Party	Election		FPv	FPv%	Result
Labour	Galway West	1969	1,174	4.9	Eliminated on count 3/8
Labour	Galway West	1973	3,346	13.5	Eliminated on count 8/8
Labour	Galway West	1975 by-election	5,269	18.9	Eliminated on count 3/4
Labour	Galway West	1977	4,952	11.7	Eliminated on count 9/9
Labour	Galway West	1981	6,226	12.3	Elected on count 6/8
Labour	Galway West	February 1982	5,718	11.8	Elected on count 6/7
Labour	Galway West	November 1982	4,449	9.0	Eliminated on count 6/6
Labour	Galway West	1987	3,878	7.4	Elected on count 13/13
Labour	Galway West	1989	7,727	15.8	Elected on count 4/7
Labour	Galway West	1992	8,910	17.7	Elected on count 1/10
Labour	Galway West	1997	4,856	10.1	Elected on count 11/11
Labour	Galway West	2002	5,213	10.6	Elected on count 15/16
Labour	Galway West	2007	6,086	11.1	Elected on count 10/13

== Presidency (2011–2025) ==
=== First term (2011–2018) ===
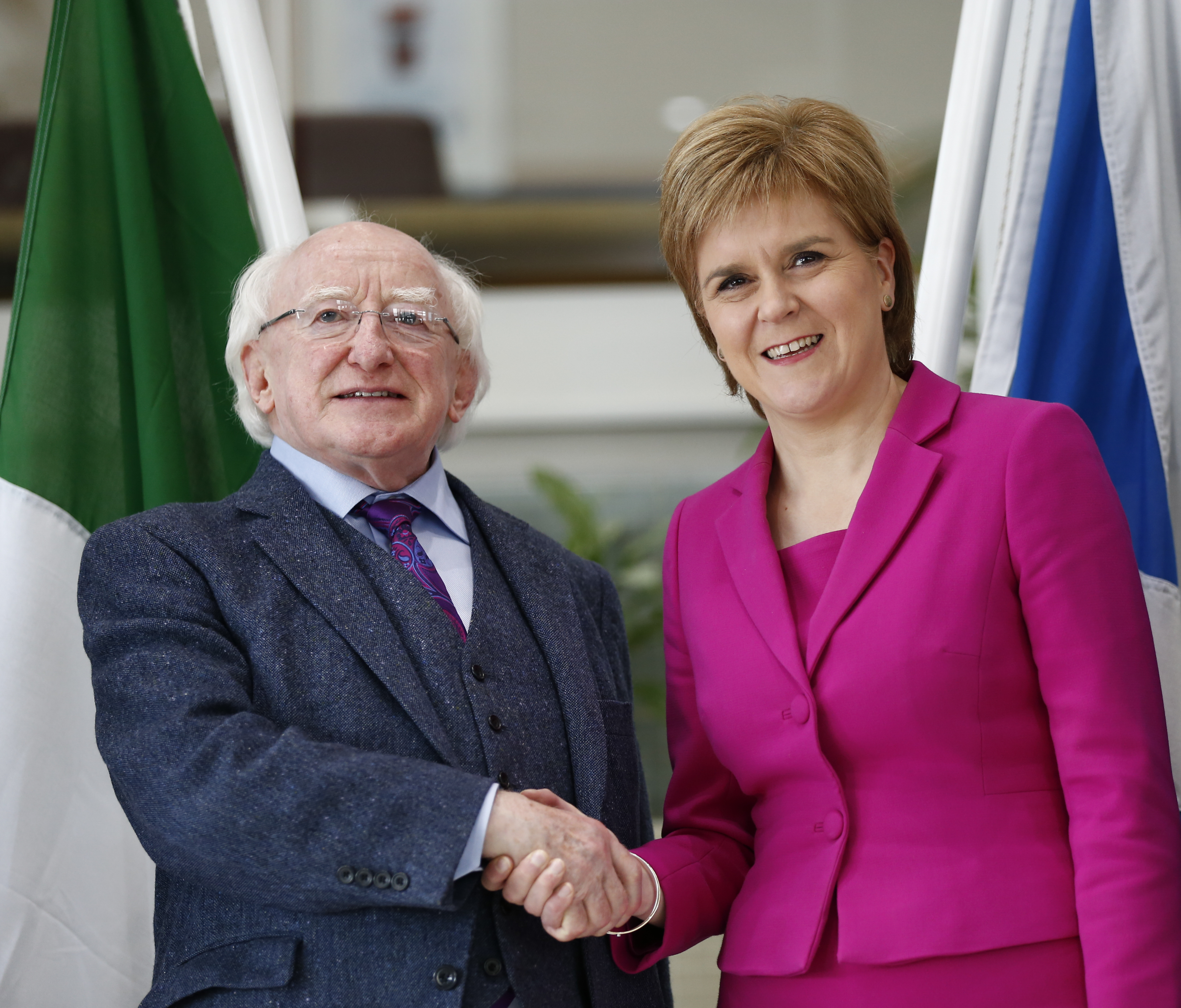
Higgins meets with First Minister of Scotland Nicola Sturgeon, June 2016

Higgins was inaugurated as president of Ireland at Dublin Castle on 11 November 2011. The ceremony had a humanist element, alongside Christian, Jewish, and Muslim ones. He received an annual salary of €250,000, having requested during his first term that the Department of Public Expenditure and Reform reduce his salary by 23.5% from €325,000.

Higgins travelled to Derry to attend the final of the All-Ireland School Choir of the Year competition on 13 November 2011 for his first official presidential engagement in Northern Ireland. In December 2011, he hosted a children's tea party at Áras an Uachtaráin. He attended the Bon Secours Hospital in Galway on 13 December for surgery on the kneecap that was broken in a fall during a visit to Buenaventura, Colombia in 2010.

Higgins made his first official trip abroad when he went to London on 21 February 2012. While there he was given a tour of the Olympic Stadium by Sebastian Coe, and attended a production of Juno and the Paycock at the Lyttelton Theatre. He made his first official visit to his alma mater NUI Galway on 24 February, where he opened an autism centre. On 21 March 2012, Higgins was announced as sole patron of the RTÉ National Symphony Orchestra. Addressing a conference organised by youth organisation Foróige on 24 March 2012, Higgins described homophobia and racism in Ireland as a "blight on society".

On 11 May 2012, he became the 28th Freeman of Galway. In June 2012, nonprofit housing organisation Habitat for Humanity Ireland announced that Higgins would be their sole Patron. In October 2012, Higgins and his wife Sabina went to South America for a two-week trip, visiting Argentina, Brazil and Chile. Higgins rushed home from a visit to Rome, Italy, to sign the Irish Bank Resolution Corporation Bill 2013 into law at Áras an Uachtaráin early on 7 February 2013, on the urgent request of the Government of Ireland. On 29 July 2013, he convened a meeting of the Council of State, the first of his presidency, to consult on the Protection of Life During Pregnancy Bill 2013.

Special advisor to the president, Mary van Lieshout, who formed part of the management team in Áras an Uachtaráin under Secretary General Adrian O'Neill, resigned in November 2013. The departure raised criticism over presidential management of the team. The presidential Christmas messages delivered by Higgins from 2011 to 2013 did not mention Christianity or religion, which was criticised by the Defence Forces' chaplain in a homily on Christmas Eve 2013. The Chief of Staff expressed regret for any offence caused by the chaplain.

In April 2014, Higgins paid the first state visit to the United Kingdom by an Irish president. He stayed as a guest of Queen Elizabeth II at Windsor Castle and addressed both Houses of Parliament. He also met various people, including British prime minister David Cameron and opposition party leaders at Westminster, and the lord mayor of London, Alan Yarrow. In December 2014, Higgins made a week-long state visit to China.

In November 2016, Higgins received criticism from some sections of the Irish media for praising Fidel Castro, saying in a statement that he learned of Castro's death with "great sadness".

On 25 August 2018, Higgins received Pope Francis at Áras an Uachtaráin during the Pope's visit to Ireland.

=== Second term (2018–2025) ===
On 10 July 2018, Higgins announced that he would stand for a second term as president in the 2018 Irish presidential election, despite having previously stated during the campaign for his first term that he would not. Higgins won the 2018 presidential election with 56% of the vote on the first count (822,566). His nearest rival, Peter Casey, finished on 23% (342,727). On 11 November 2018, Higgins was inaugurated as president of Ireland in St. Patrick's Hall, Dublin Castle, in a ceremony attended by Taoiseach Leo Varadkar, and former presidents Mary Robinson and Mary McAleese, as well as representatives of all political parties. The ceremony was held in the evening so that Higgins could attend Armistice Day commemorations in the morning.

On 3 July 2019, Higgins began a three-day state visit to Germany. While visiting Germany, Higgins met with German chancellor Angela Merkel and President of Germany Frank-Walter Steinmeier.

In July 2021, Higgins sent a letter to the Oireachtas expressing concern that there had been a tendency in recent years for him to be sent a large volume of complex legislation to be signed quickly.

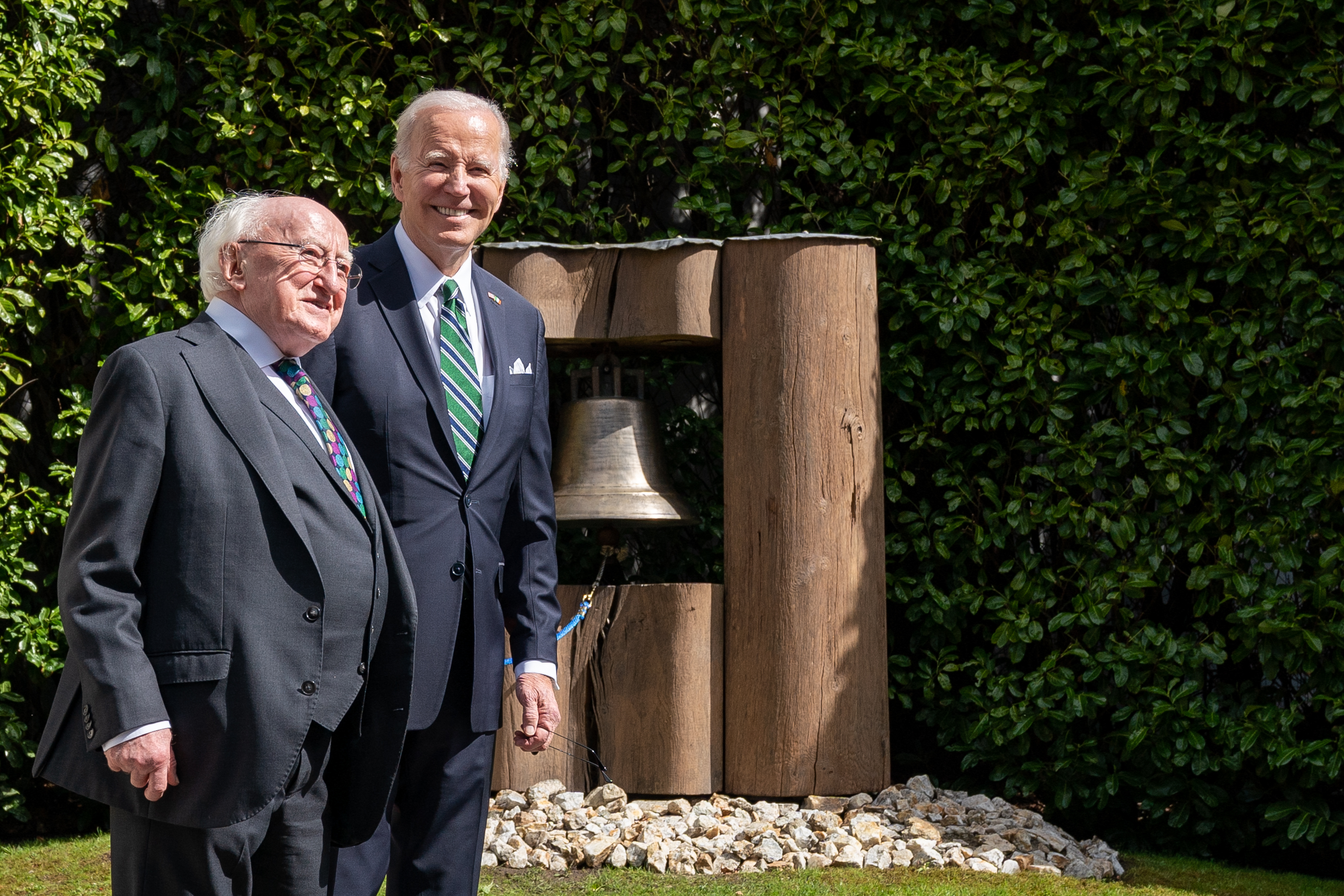
Higgins meeting U.S. president Joe Biden and ringing the Peace Bell, April 2023.

On 15 September 2021, Higgins declined an invitation to attend a church service with Britain's Queen Elizabeth II in October to mark Northern Ireland's centenary. Two days later on 17 September, Higgins defended his decision not to attend the service and decided it would be "inappropriate to attend". Pope Francis described Higgins as a "wise man of today" during an audience in the Vatican.

On 15 June 2022, Higgins described housing in Ireland as "our great, great failure," saying, "It isn't a crisis anymore — it is a disaster."

On 19 September 2022, Higgins was among 500 presidents, prime ministers, foreign royal family members and dignitaries who attended the state funeral of Queen Elizabeth II.

On 24 January 2023, Higgins began a five-day state visit to Senegal, his first time in Africa since 2014. While visiting Senegal, Higgins met with Senegalese president Macky Sall.

On 13 April, Higgins received U.S. President Joe Biden at Áras an Uachtaráin during his four-day visit to the island of Ireland.

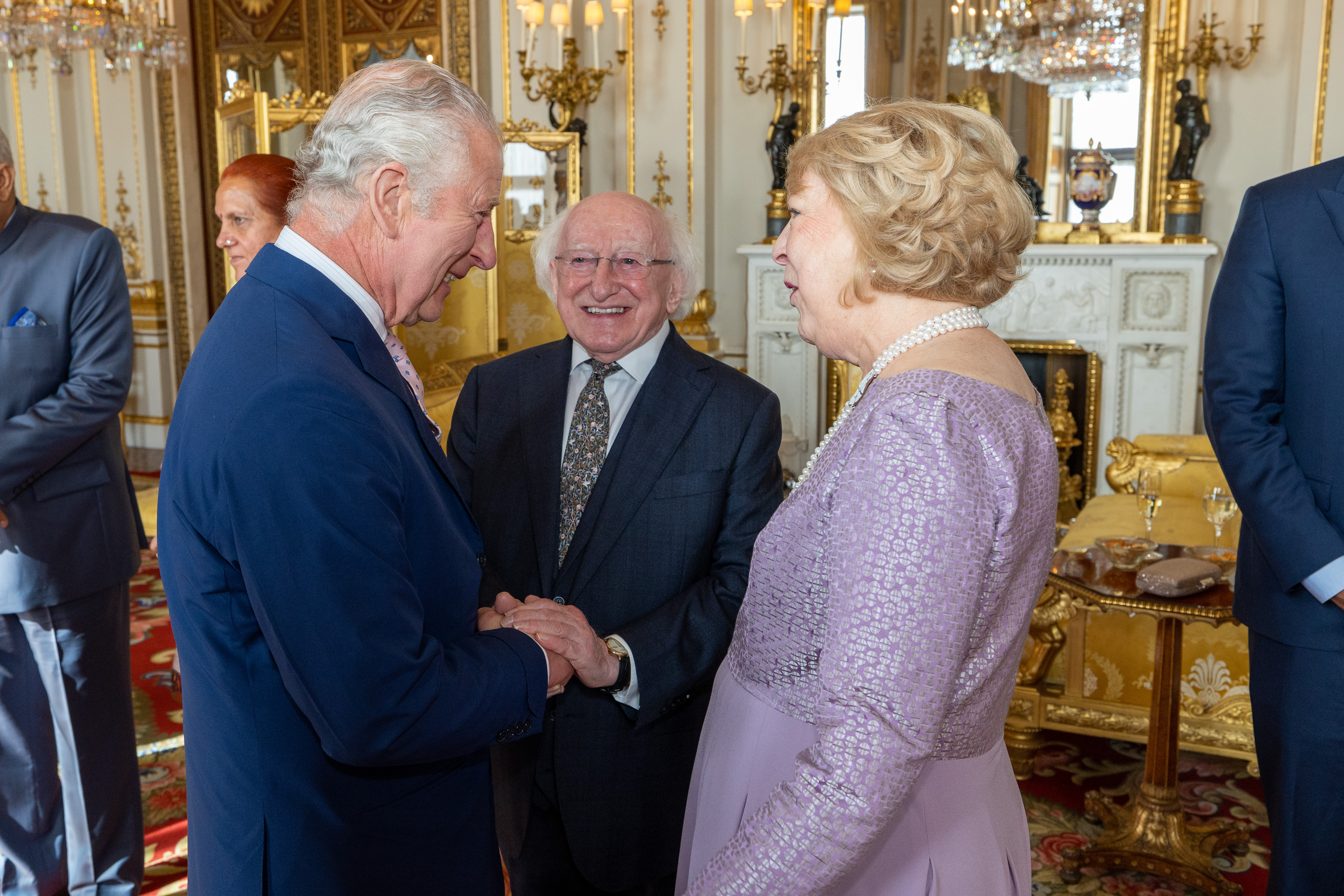
Higgins and his wife, Sabina, with Charles III, at a reception in Buckingham Palace, May 2023.

On 28 April, Higgins made a speech from Áras an Uachtaráin in which he criticised economists for being "obsessed" with economic growth and consumption and for promoting "neoliberalism". The same speech urged economists to be more environmentally conscious and to imagine a greener future. The speech was criticised by Irish economists, who responded by arguing that Higgins's criticisms were outdated by several decades and that the study of economics in 2023 pivoted long ago to be highly environmentally conscious, something Higgins would be aware of if he interacted with economists more. Labour senator Marie Sherlock defended Higgins's commentary while the Minister for Public Expenditure Paschal Donohoe stated he welcomed the debate brought about by Higgins's comments.

On 6 May, Higgins was at the Coronation of Charles III and Camilla, marking the first time that a President of Ireland had attended the coronation of a British monarch.

On 29 February 2024, Higgins was taken to hospital as a precaution after complaining of feeling unwell. On 24 April, Higgins confirmed he had suffered a mild stroke.

On 20 December 2024, Higgins delivered his final Christmas Message as President of Ireland, in which he called against worldwide conflict and the ensuing human rights violations, praised the Irish communities worldwide, wished well all new citizens welcomed to the country and thanked the people of Ireland for their support over his two terms as president.

On 27 January 2025, Higgins was accused by multiple Israeli Ministers and former Israeli Ambassador to Ireland Dana Erlich of "politicalising" a Holocaust Memorial Day Commemoration in Dublin to commemorate 80 years since the liberation of Auschwitz. One protester was removed and others left the event during Higgins's speech, when he said "Those in Israel who mourn their loved ones, those who have been waiting for the release of hostages, or the thousands searching for relatives in the rubble in Gaza will welcome the long-overdue ceasefire for which there has been such a heavy price paid." Tom O'Dowd, the chairperson of Holocaust Education Ireland (who organise the commemoration), said "It turned out to be a very small protest. It didn't stop the President in his stride. And I think it is worth pointing out that the President has spent a lifetime fighting for civil and human rights, and I don't think he would object to people objecting either." This was the seventh occasion on which Higgins had been invited to speak at the annual commemoration.

== Post-presidency ==
In his first post-presidency interview with the Galway Advertiser in February 2026, Higgins proposed reforms to presidential powers. He proposed reforms to Article 26 of the Constitution, to allow ordinary citizens to challenge legislation in the courts, if the Supreme Court rules that it is constitutional after referral by the president. Higgins also proposed a relook into Article 28 which stipulates how government is formed, how wars and emergencies are declared, and the requirement of the Taoiseach to keep the President generally informed on matters of domestic and international policy. Higgins also expressed criticism of the press during his presidency, and of the Department of Foreign Affairs for holding too much sway over the office of President. He reiterated comments, made during his presidency, that the volume of legislation to be reviewed by a president is onerous, and criticized British politician Nigel Farage, and Israel’s genocidal policy toward Palestinians.

In April 2026 Higgins returned €384,467 to the Exchequer in unspent funds from the allowance allocated to him for his second term, with a total return of €2,622,875 to the State over the course of his two terms, including €1,310,491 in Oireachtas and ministerial pensions and €689,474 in pay.

== Political positions and views ==
Higgins is generally described as a left-wing socialist. His political career has been marked by a focus on human rights, social justice, and opposition to neoliberal economics. He has been involved in causes such as gender equality, minority rights, and the protection of civil liberties, both in Ireland and internationally. Throughout his life, he has been a critic of militarism and imperialism, notably opposing American interventions in Latin America in the 1980s and the Iraq War in 2003. Higgins also places strong emphasis on cultural development, climate justice, and the idea of a more inclusive and compassionate Republic. A fluent Irish speaker and writer, Higgins has advocated for greater emphasis on the Irish language throughout his career. As part of this, he created Teilifís na Gaeilge (later renamed TG4) in late 1996, establishing a dedicated Irish-language television station aimed at promoting the language and culture.

Those critical of Higgins's views have called his views outdated. In 2022 Michael McDowell criticised him after Higgins suggested Ireland had been "ravaged due to decades of attack from an orthodox, laissez-faire economics". McDowell counterargued that Ireland had grown by leaps and bounds economically since the 1970s and to use terms like "ravaged" did not reflect reality. In 2023, Irish economists called Higgins out of touch after he suggested they were prioritising neoliberalism over environmental concerns, and argued they had already incorporated such viewpoints long ago. Others have been critical of Higgins's views of Cuba and Iran, arguing that these countries run counter to Higgins's anti-authoritarian values.

== Council of State ==
=== Presidential appointees ===
Higgins appointed the following Council of State nominees on 6 January 2012 for his first term as president: The nominees were:

- Michael Farrell – solicitor with Free Legal Advice Centres
- Deirdre Heenan – Provost and Dean of Academic Development at the University of Ulster
- Catherine McGuinness – former Senator, member of the Council of State, and former Supreme Court judge
- Ruairí McKiernan – community activist and social entrepreneur
- Sally Mulready – London-resident campaigner for the rights of survivors of Irish institutions and local councillor in the London Borough of Hackney
- Gearóid Ó Tuathaigh – Professor emeritus in history at the National University of Ireland, Galway.
- Gerard Quinn – Director of the Centre for Disability Law and Policy at the NUI Galway School of Law

Higgins's nominees for his second term of office were announced on 4 April 2019:

- Cara Augustenborg – a fellow in environmental policy at University College Dublin
- Sinéad Burke – writer, academic and disability activist
- Sindy Joyce – Irish Traveller human rights activist
- Maurice Malone – chief executive of the Birmingham Irish Association.
- Johnston McMaster – a Methodist minister and assistant professor at Trinity College Dublin
- Mary Murphy – senior lecturer at Maynooth University
- Seán Ó Cuirreáin – former radio producer and Irish language commissioner

== Writing ==
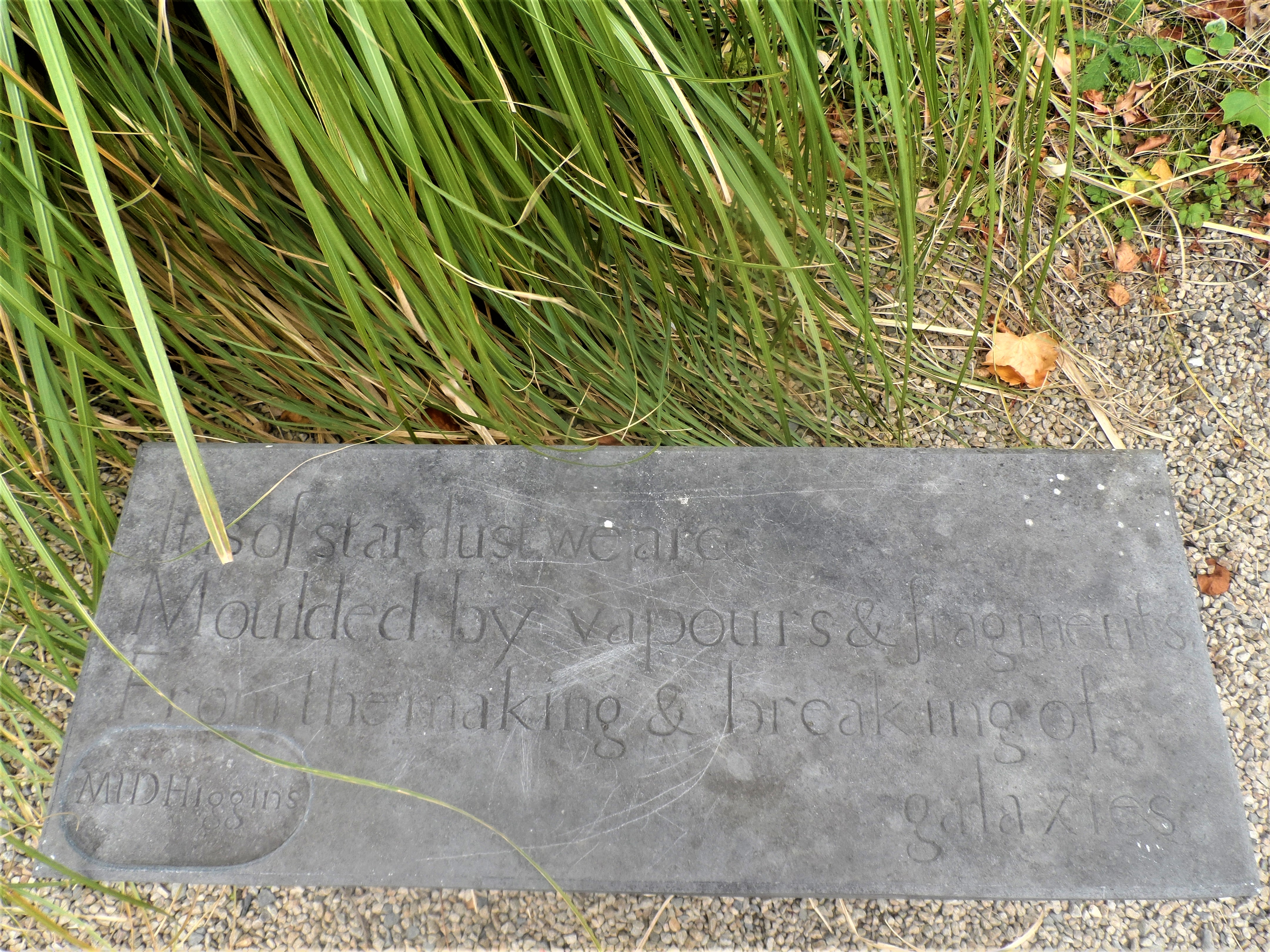
A piece of Higgins's poetry on a plaque in Cahir

As well as having a successful political career Higgins has had a career as a poet and broadcaster and has produced works of non-fiction. He has contributed widely to political and philosophical journals on numerous subjects, among them ideology, the sociology of literature, clientelism in politics, regionalism and the politics of the media. He wrote and presented a television film on Montserrat, entitled The Other Emerald Isle for Channel 4 and his documentary on the life of Noel Browne, for RTÉ, has also been screened.

Higgins has had poems published in a number of periodicals, as well as publishing four collections of his poetry, including The Betrayal (1990), his second book of poems The Season of Fire (1993) and his latest book An Arid Season (2004). His personal notes and work books reside at the National Library of Ireland.

Among Higgins's poems are "The death of the Red Cow" and "The Ass", an ode to a donkey.

Higgins wrote for Hot Press from 1983 to 1993 contributing with a forthnightly column. His writing tackled global issues like apartheid, US foreign policy, and Irish referendums on divorce and abortion, while celebrating arts and culture. A selections of these works were re-published in 2024 book Power to the People: The Hot Press Years.

Poetry

- The Betrayal (Salmon, Galway, 1990) ISBN 094833939X
- The Season of Fire (Brandon, Dingle, 1993) ISBN 0863221645
- An Arid Season (2004)
- New and Selected Poems (Liberties Press, Dublin, 2011)
- The Prophets are Weeping (M.D.H. 2014)
- Against All Certainty (Claddagh Records, Dublin 2025), with music by Myles O'Reilly

Non-fiction

- Causes for Concern (Liberties Press, Dublin, 2007)
- Renewing the Republic (Liberties Press, Dublin, 2011)
- Foreword to "Delinquent Genius: The Strange Affair of Man and His Technology" by Mike Cooley
- When Ideas Matter: Speeches for an Ethical Republic (Head of Zeus, London, 2017)
- Power To The People: The Hot Press Years (Hot Press Books, Dublin, 2024)

== Other work ==
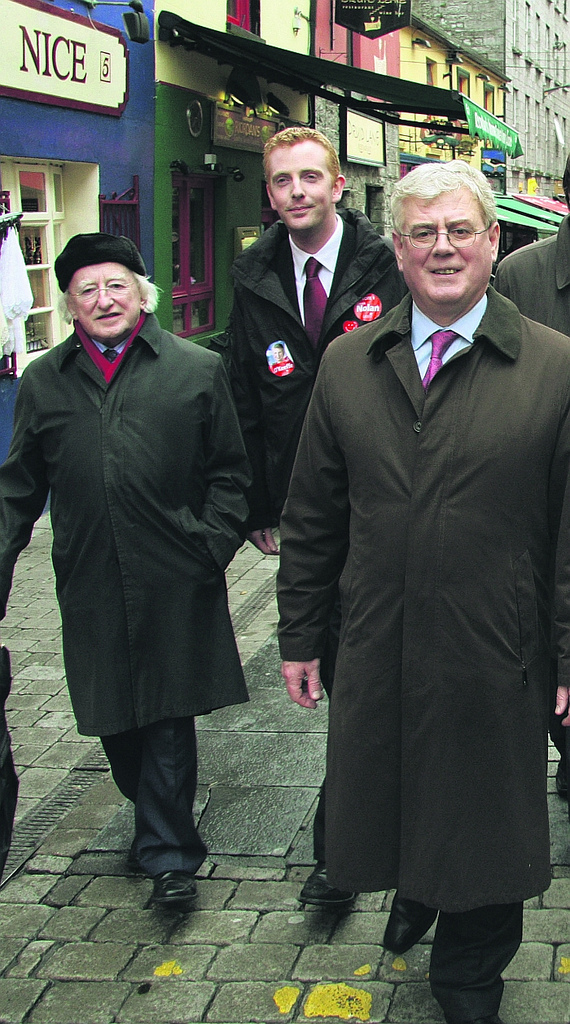
Higgins, Derek Nolan and Eamon Gilmore on the campaign trail, Galway, 2009

Higgins has campaigned for human rights and written of conflict in many parts of the world, including such areas as Nicaragua, Chile, Cambodia, El Salvador, Iraq, and Somalia. He spoke in the Dáil in defence of the 2010 Gaza Freedom Flotilla. In recognition of his work for peace with justice in many parts of the world, he became the first recipient of the Seán MacBride Peace Prize of the International Peace Bureau in Helsinki, Finland, in 1992. He was a noted critic of U.S. foreign policy under the Ronald Reagan administration. In 2005, in response to a column for the Irish Independent by Kevin Myers about the riots then erupting across immigrant areas in France and Britain, he said "the contents of his column today go beyond his usually crafted cowardice, staying one step on the safe side of prosecution for incitement to hatred or racism."

Higgins has voiced his support for the Campaign for the Establishment of a United Nations Parliamentary Assembly, an organisation which campaigns for democratic reformation of the United Nations, and the creation of a more accountable international political system.

Higgins's eclectic mix of interests also extends to sport; he is a regular at the Galway Races each summer and he has also previously served as president of Galway United F.C., is a well known football supporter and regularly attends League of Ireland games. In 2014 the Football Association of Ireland introduced a new association football super cup, the President's Cup, in his honour. On 25 February 2014, the cup itself was officially unveiled with a ceremony at Áras an Uachtaráin. Higgins subsequently attended the inaugural final at Richmond Park on 2 March 2014.

Higgins is the subject of the song "Michael D. Rocking in the Dáil" by popular Tuam band The Saw Doctors. The song first appeared as a B-side on the 1994 single "Small Bit of Love" and is also on the 2002 compilation Play It Again, Sham!.

== Honours and awards ==
=== Foreign honours ===
- El Salvador: Grand Cross of the Order of José Matías Delgado. Awarded in 2013 after Higgins returned to El Salvador as president of Ireland, where 31 years earlier he had visited on a fact-finding mission to investigate the El Mozote massacre.
- Peru: Grand Collar of the Order of the Sun of Peru. Awarded in 2017.
- United Nations: It was reported on 26 January 2024 that Higgins had been awarded the United Nations Agricola Medal (agricola means farmer in Latin). He would be presented with the award by the Director-General of the Food and Agriculture Organisation (FAO), Qu Dongyu, in a ceremony in Dublin later in the year. Higgins was selected by the FAO "in recognition of your contribution and commitment to the welfare of all peoples, your extraordinary support for FAO's fundamental goal of attaining universal food security, and the pursuit of the United Nations Sustainable Development Goals."

== Personal life ==
His wife, Sabina Higgins (née Coyne), is an actress and a native of Cloonrane, a townland in County Galway near Ballindine, County Mayo. She grew up on a farm there in a family of five girls and two boys.

Higgins met Coyne in 1969, at a party in the family home of journalist Mary Kenny in Dublin. Higgins proposed over Christmas 1973, and they married on 8 July 1974 at St Mary's Catholic Church, Haddington Road, Dublin. They have four children: Alice-Mary, Daniel, and twins, John and Michael Jr.; Alice-Mary was elected to Seanad Éireann in 2016.

Higgins has a Bernese Mountain Dog named Misneach ("Courage"). He previously had a number of other Bernese dogs - Síoda and Bród, who died in 2020 and 2023 respectively, and earlier in his presidency a dog called Shadow.

Party political offices
Preceded by Roddy Connolly	Chair of the Labour Party; 1978–1981	Succeeded by Mervyn Taylor
Civic offices
Preceded by Claude Toft	Mayor of Galway; 1981–1982	Succeeded by Pat McNamara
Preceded by Angela Lynch-Lupton	Mayor of Galway; 1990–1991	Succeeded by Michael Leahy
Political offices
Preceded by John Wilson	Minister for Arts, Culture and the Gaeltacht; 1993–1994	Succeeded by Bertie Ahern
Preceded by Bertie Ahern	Minister for Arts, Culture and the Gaeltacht; 1994–1997	Succeeded by Síle de Valera
Preceded by Mary McAleese	President of Ireland; 2011–2025	Succeeded by Catherine Connolly

Dáil	Election	Deputy (Party)	Deputy (Party)	Deputy (Party)	Deputy (Party)	Deputy (Party)
9th	1937	Gerald Bartley (FF)	Joseph Mongan (FG)	Seán Tubridy (FF)	3 seats 1937–1977	
10th	1938	Gerald Bartley (FF)	Joseph Mongan (FG)	Seán Tubridy (FF)	3 seats 1937–1977	
10th	1940 by-election	Gerald Bartley (FF)	Joseph Mongan (FG)	John J. Keane (FF)	3 seats 1937–1977	
11th	1943	Gerald Bartley (FF)	Joseph Mongan (FG)	Eamon Corbett (FF)	3 seats 1937–1977	
12th	1944	Gerald Bartley (FF)	Joseph Mongan (FG)	Michael Lydon (FF)	3 seats 1937–1977	
13th	1948	Gerald Bartley (FF)	Joseph Mongan (FG)	Michael Lydon (FF)	3 seats 1937–1977	
14th	1951	Gerald Bartley (FF)	John Mannion Snr (FG)	Peadar Duignan (FF)	3 seats 1937–1977	
15th	1954	Gerald Bartley (FF)	Fintan Coogan Snr (FG)	Johnny Geoghegan (FF)	3 seats 1937–1977	
16th	1957	Gerald Bartley (FF)	Fintan Coogan Snr (FG)	Johnny Geoghegan (FF)	3 seats 1937–1977	
17th	1961	Gerald Bartley (FF)	Fintan Coogan Snr (FG)	Johnny Geoghegan (FF)	3 seats 1937–1977	
18th	1965	Bobby Molloy (FF)	Fintan Coogan Snr (FG)	Johnny Geoghegan (FF)	3 seats 1937–1977	
19th	1969	Bobby Molloy (FF)	Fintan Coogan Snr (FG)	Johnny Geoghegan (FF)	3 seats 1937–1977	
20th	1973	Bobby Molloy (FF)	Fintan Coogan Snr (FG)	Johnny Geoghegan (FF)	3 seats 1937–1977	
20th	1975 by-election	Bobby Molloy (FF)	Fintan Coogan Snr (FG)	Máire Geoghegan-Quinn (FF)	3 seats 1937–1977	
21st	1977	Bobby Molloy (FF)	John Mannion Jnr (FG)	Máire Geoghegan-Quinn (FF)	Bill Loughnane (FF)	4 seats 1977–1981
22nd	1981	Bobby Molloy (FF)	John Donnellan (FG)	Máire Geoghegan-Quinn (FF)	Mark Killilea Jnr (FF)	Michael D. Higgins (Lab)
23rd	1982 (Feb)	Bobby Molloy (FF)	John Donnellan (FG)	Máire Geoghegan-Quinn (FF)	Frank Fahey (FF)	Michael D. Higgins (Lab)
24th	1982 (Nov)	Bobby Molloy (FF)	John Donnellan (FG)	Máire Geoghegan-Quinn (FF)	Frank Fahey (FF)	Fintan Coogan Jnr (FG)
25th	1987	Bobby Molloy (PDs)	John Donnellan (FG)	Máire Geoghegan-Quinn (FF)	Frank Fahey (FF)	Michael D. Higgins (Lab)
26th	1989	Bobby Molloy (PDs)	Pádraic McCormack (FG)	Máire Geoghegan-Quinn (FF)	Frank Fahey (FF)	Michael D. Higgins (Lab)
27th	1992	Bobby Molloy (PDs)	Pádraic McCormack (FG)	Máire Geoghegan-Quinn (FF)	Éamon Ó Cuív (FF)	Michael D. Higgins (Lab)
28th	1997	Bobby Molloy (PDs)	Pádraic McCormack (FG)	Frank Fahey (FF)	Éamon Ó Cuív (FF)	Michael D. Higgins (Lab)
29th	2002	Noel Grealish (PDs)	Pádraic McCormack (FG)	Frank Fahey (FF)	Éamon Ó Cuív (FF)	Michael D. Higgins (Lab)
30th	2007	Noel Grealish (PDs)	Pádraic McCormack (FG)	Frank Fahey (FF)	Éamon Ó Cuív (FF)	Michael D. Higgins (Lab)
31st	2011	Noel Grealish (Ind.)	Brian Walsh (FG)	Seán Kyne (FG)	Éamon Ó Cuív (FF)	Derek Nolan (Lab)
32nd	2016	Noel Grealish (Ind.)	Hildegarde Naughton (FG)	Seán Kyne (FG)	Éamon Ó Cuív (FF)	Catherine Connolly (Ind.)
33rd	2020	Noel Grealish (Ind.)	Hildegarde Naughton (FG)	Mairéad Farrell (SF)	Éamon Ó Cuív (FF)	Catherine Connolly (Ind.)
34th	2024	Noel Grealish (Ind.)	Hildegarde Naughton (FG)	Mairéad Farrell (SF)	John Connolly (FF)	Catherine Connolly (Ind.)
34th	2026 by-election	Noel Grealish (Ind.)	Hildegarde Naughton (FG)	Mairéad Farrell (SF)	John Connolly (FF)	Seán Kyne (FG)
