= Ashtown Castle =

Tower house in Phoenix Park in Dublin, Ireland

Coordinates: 53.365766°N 6.330574°W

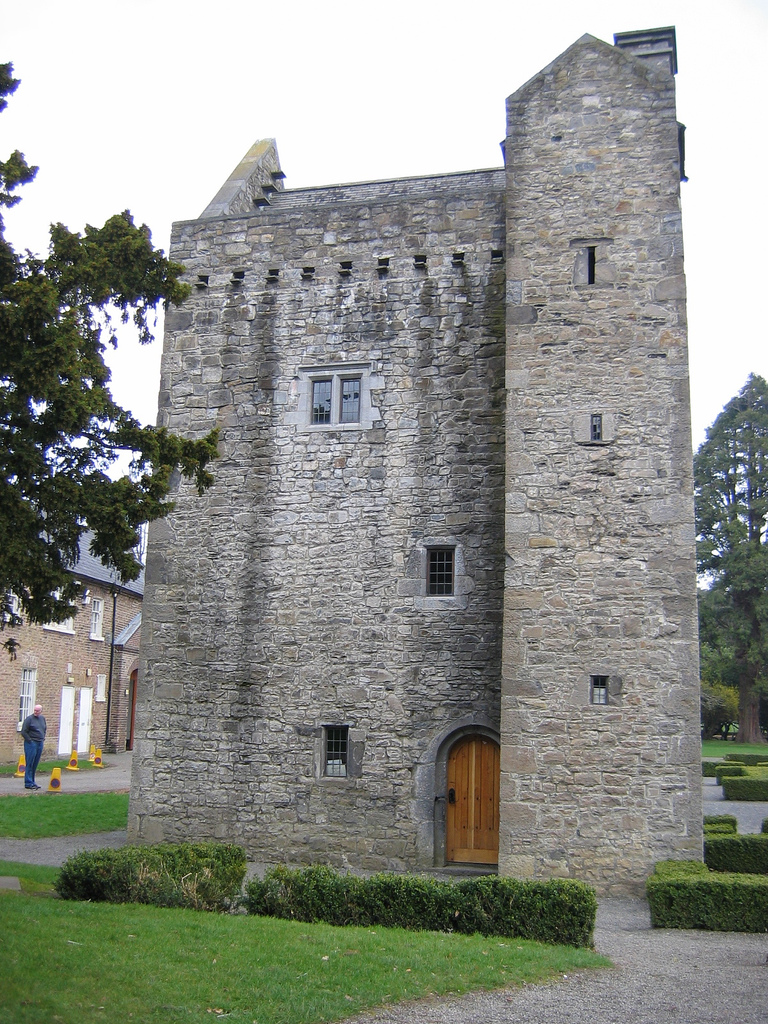
Ashtown Castle

Ashtown Castle (Irish: Caisleán Bhaile an Ásaigh) is a tower house in the Phoenix Park in Dublin, Ireland.

It was found hidden within the walls of a much larger and more recent Georgian building, the Under Secretary's Lodge also known as Ashtown Lodge, that was being used by the Papal Nuncio until 1978. At that time, the Lodge was deemed structurally irreparable due to dry rot. However, as the building was being demolished, Ashtown Castle was discovered. It has now been restored and forms part of the Phoenix Park Visitor Centre.

It is thought to originally date from the 1430s, as it is built to dimensions that conform with a government policy of the time that offered £10 to those who built a castle for their own safety.

== The Phoenix Park Visitor Centre ==
The Phoenix Park Visitor Centre is beside the Castle. It has visitor information, an exhibition of the Phoenix Park History dating back from 3500 BC to the present. There is a café in the visitor centre grounds.
