= Under Secretary's Lodge =

Coordinates: 53.365766°N 6.330574°W

The Under Secretary's Lodge was formerly the Dublin residence of the British Under-Secretary for Ireland (the British Administration's chief civil servant). After the creation of the Irish Free State in 1922, the office of Under Secretary was abolished as the British Administration came to an end.

The residence was rented by the Irish Free State to the Vatican for use as the Apostolic Nunciature (papal embassy). The Lodge was vacated by the Papal Nuncio in the mid-1970s, when he moved to a new purpose-built nunciature on the Navan Road in Dublin. It was intended to turn the Lodge into a Taoiseach's residence (residence of the prime minister of Ireland). But after some years' delay, it was decided that the Lodge (in a politically unappealing Georgian style) was in too poor a state of repair due to dry rot to be converted and so was demolished.

A preservable medieval tower house, a fortified structure dating from the 1430s, was found to be at the centre of the demolished Georgian building. It has been restored, and as Ashtown Castle it is used as an interpretative centre.

While it served as the Apostolic Nunciature, one of its most famous residents was Giovanni Montini, later Pope Paul VI, who worked as a young diplomat there.
