= Recorded Live in Ireland =

Live album by The Clancy Brothers and Tommy Makem
- Released: January 1965
- Recorded: 21 and 22 August 1964
- Venue: Ulster Hall, Belfast
- Genre: Irish folk music
- Label: Columbia
- Producer: Tom Wilson

The Clancy Brothers and Tommy Makem chronology
| The First Hurrah! (1964) | Recorded Live in Ireland (1965) | Isn't It Grand Boys (1966) |

Singles from Recorded Live in Ireland
- 1. "Wild Rover"/"Wella Wallia"

Recorded Live in Ireland is a 1965 album of Irish folk songs performed by The Clancy Brothers and Tommy Makem. It was the first live album to be recorded in stereo in Ireland. It was their sixth LP for Columbia Records and, unusually for the group, included two newly composed songs in the folk style. Music critic Joe Goldberg wrote the liner notes.

== Music on the album ==
The album contained the first recording of "Lament for Brendan Behan," a recently composed tribute to the late Irish author, Brendan Behan, whom the Clancys had personally known. Tommy Makem wrote "The Curlew's Song" for the album. Two more songs, "Butcher Boy" and "Beggar Man" (a.k.a. "The Little Beggarman"), Makem learned from his mother, Sarah, a source singer for folk song collectors. The sound fades briefly at the end of "Beggar Man" when Makem danced a jig onstage as the audience cheered. The group learned "Wild Rover" from Luke Kelly of The Dubliners, with whom they were friends. They sang the number "Wella Wallia" (a.k.a. "Weile Waile" and "The River Saile") for laughs, using fake Dublin accents to the delight of the audience. As was standard in their concerts, Tom Clancy recited the opening lines of James Joyce's novel, Finnegans Wake before the group sang "New Finnegan's Wake."

== Reception ==
Billboard chose the album as a "Special Merit Pick." The magazine's reviewer called the album "a happy package, packed with lots of folk zing." The reviewer also noted how the group had "an exuberant audience for their exuberant style" during the live concert.

== Other versions ==
A special mono version (XLP-78272-1A/XLP-78273-1A) of the album released only in Canada in 1965 contains some spoken material that is not included on the U.S. and British releases. On this mono LP, Paddy Clancy introduces the song, "The Rocks of Bawn"; on the standard version, there is no spoken introduction before the number. The dialogue before "Maid of Fife" is also longer, and Tom Clancy makes a comment after "New Finnegan's Wake" before the concert's intermission. This version also switches the order of the songs, "Wild Rover" and "Nightingale."

The American version of the LP was released in the United Kingdom by CBS Records in both stereo and mono versions. It was also released in Australia in EP format.

== Track listing ==
All songs are Traditional, except where noted.

Side one
| No. | Title | Writer(s) | Lead vocals | Length |
|---|---|---|---|---|
| 1. | "Wild Rover" | arranged by the Clancy Brothers, Tommy Makem & Luke Kelly | Liam Clancy | 3:15 |
| 2. | "Maid of Fife" | | Tom Clancy and Paddy Clancy | 2:57 |
| 3. | "Butcher Boy" | arranged by the CBTM & Sarah Makem | Tommy Makem | 3:29 |
| 4. | "Wella Wallia" | arranged by the CBTM | Each singer has solos | 2:27 |
| 5. | "Lament for Brendan Behan" | Fred Geis | Liam Clancy | 3:12 |
| 6. | "New Finnegan's Wake" | | Each singer has solos | 4:34 |

Side two
| No. | Title | Writer(s) | Lead vocals | Length |
|---|---|---|---|---|
| 1. | "Beggar Man [with part of Galway Races]" | arranged by the CBTM & Sarah Makem | Tommy Makem [and Liam Clancy] | 2:01 |
| 2. | "Ar Fol Lol La Lo" | arranged by the CBTM & Archie Fisher | Liam Clancy | 3:14 |
| 3. | "Rocks of Bawn" | arranged by the CBTM | Paddy Clancy | 3:29 |
| 4. | "Nightingale" | arranged by the CBTM | Liam Clancy | 3:01 |
| 5. | "The Curlew's Song" | Tommy Makem | Tommy Makem | 3:14 |
| 6. | "They're Moving Father's Grave to Build a Sewer [with My Old Man (Said Follow the Van)]" | J. & H. Kennedy; [Fred W. Leigh; Charles Collins] | Tom Clancy | 2:42 |

== Personnel ==
- Paddy Clancy - vocals, harmonica
- Tom Clancy - vocals
- Liam Clancy - vocals, guitar
- Tommy Makem - vocals, banjo, tin whistle
