= Older But No Wiser =

Studio album by The Clancy Brothers and Robbie O'Connell
- Released: November 7, 1995
- Recorded: 1995
- Genre: Irish folk
- Length: 45:49
- Labels: Vanguard; VSD 79488 2 CD
- Producer: Garry O'Briain

The Clancy Brothers and Robbie O'Connell chronology
Tunes 'n' Tales of Ireland (1988)	Older But No Wiser (1995)

Professional ratings
Review scores
Source	Rating
Allmusic	link

Older But No Wiser is a 1995 album by the Irish folk group, The Clancy Brothers and Robbie O'Connell. This was the Clancy Brothers' final album, released almost four decades after the group's first album, The Rising of the Moon. It was also their third album for Vanguard Records. The songs on Older But No Wiser are notable for their thicker musical accompaniment than was typical of Clancy recordings, as well their first use of female back-up singers.

This was the only album that Paddy Clancy, Bobby Clancy, Liam Clancy, and their nephew, Robbie O'Connell, recorded together. For all previous Clancy Brothers recordings, the group had different line-ups.

== Background and music ==
The inspiration for this album came from the Clancy Brothers' performance at Bob Dylan's 30th Anniversary Concert Celebration, where the group performed, "When the Ship Comes In". Except for this live number, which they re-recorded in a studio, the Clancy Brothers had never before recorded any of the tracks on this album. Liam Clancy performed the most solos.

The Clancy Brothers and Robbie O'Connell focused this album largely on the theme of aging and nostalgia. Three of the numbers, "When the Ship Comes In" and "Ramblin' Gamblin' Willie" by Bob Dylan and "Those Were the Days" by Gene Raskin, were written by the Clancys' old friends from Greenwich Village during the American folk music revival of the 1960s. Bob Dylan had originally based "Ramblin' Gamblin' Willie" on the Clancy Brothers' version of the Irish rebel song, "Brennan on the Moor," one of the group's most popular songs in the early 1960s. The tavern mentioned in the song, "Those Were the Days," referred to the White Horse Tavern in Greenwich Village, where the Clancy Brothers used to drink and informally sing.

Paddy Clancy's one solo on the album, "Let No Man Steal Your Thyme," was a song that he recorded Robin Roberts performing in 1959 for Tradition Records, a small record label that he ran at the time. The numbers, "Roll on the Day" and "Lily Marlene," deal with themes of death and loss, respectively. The Clancys had known "The Boys of Wexford" since their boyhoods, and a few other songs on the album were written by old friends, including "The Flower of Scotland," by the late Roy Williamson of The Corries.

The group recorded the album at Ring Studios next to Liam Clancy's home in County Waterford, Ireland. Older But No Wiser was the Clancy Brothers' first studio album since their 1974 LP, Greatest Hits.

== Reception ==
Patrick Street, writing in the magazine, Dirty Linen, called this last Clancy Brothers album "probably the best studio recording of their distinguished career." He applauded all the singers and accompanists, while singling out Robbie O'Connell for having the best voice of the group.

The reviewer for the folk music magazine, Sing Out!, praised the "Clancy's patented hearty and gusty singing and O'Connell's more sensitive style" on the album.

== Track listing ==
All songs arranged by the Clancy Brothers & Robbie O'Connell and Garry O'Briain.

No.	Title	Writer(s)	Lead vocals	Length
1.	"Ramblin' Gamblin' Willie"	Bob Dylan	Each singer has solos	3:25
2.	"When the Ship Comes In"	Bob Dylan	Liam Clancy and Robbie O'Connell	3:46
3.	"Lily Marlene"	Norbert Schultze, Tommie Connor	Bobby Clancy	3:42
4.	"Roll On The Day"	Allan Taylor	Liam Clancy	3:08
5.	"Let No Man Steal Your Thyme"	Traditional	Paddy Clancy	4:09
6.	"Salonika"	Traditional	No solos	2:31
7.	"Flower of Scotland"	Roy Williamson	Liam Clancy	3:02
8.	"The Curragh of Kildare"	Traditional	Robbie O'Connell	3:36
9.	"The Boys of Wexford"	Arthur Warren Darley, Patrick Joseph McCall	Bobby Clancy, Paddy Clancy and Liam Clancy	3:55
10.	"The Final Trawl"	Archie Fisher	Liam Clancy	4:53
11.	"The Lads of the Fair"	Brian McNeill	Robbie O'Connell	3:25
12.	"Those Were the Days"	Boris Fomin, Gene Raskin	Liam Clancy	5:46

== Personnel ==
The Clancy Brothers and Robbie O'Connell

- Paddy Clancy - vocals, harmonica
- Liam Clancy - vocals, concertina
- Bobby Clancy - vocals, harmonica
- Robbie O'Connell - vocals, guitar

with:

- Miss Brown To You - backup vocals
- Dónal Clancy - guitar
- Martin Murray - fiddle, mandolin, viola
- Dave Prim - bass
- Martin Cooney - banjo
- Mairtin O'Connor - accordion
- Tommy Keane - uilleann pipes
- Harry Doherty - clarinet, alto saxophone
- Donnachadha Gough - bodhrán
- Damien Foley - trombone, euphonium
- Garry O'Briain - mando-cello
- Geraldine Cullen - cello

Technical

- Recorded and mixed at Ring Studios, County Waterford, Ireland
- Martin Murray - engineering, mixing
- Jeff Zaraya, Sound Byte, NY - mastering
- Jim McKague - executive producer
- Norton Associates, Dublin - photography
- Georgette Cartwright - creative services
