= Bobby Clancy =

Irish singer and musician

- Bobby Clancy in 1970.

Background information
- Born: Robert Joseph Clancy; 11 May 1927
- Origin: Carrick-on-Suir, County Tipperary, Ireland
- Died: 6 September 2002 (aged 75) Carrick-on-Suir, County Tipperary, Ireland
- Genres: Folk; traditional Irish
- Occupations: Singer; musician
- Instruments: Vocals; banjo; guitar; harmonica; bodhrán
- Years active: 1950s–2002
- Formerly of: The Clancy Brothers; The Clancys and Eddie Dillon; Cherish the Ladies

Robert Joseph 'Bobby' Clancy Jr (11 May 1927 – 6 September 2002) was an Irish singer and musician best known as a member of The Clancy Brothers, one of the most successful and influential Irish folk groups. He accompanied his songs on five-string banjo, guitar, bodhrán, and harmonica.

== Early years ==
Bobby Clancy was born in Carrick-on-Suir, County Tipperary, Ireland to Robert J. Clancy and Johanna McGrath. He was the twin brother of Joan Clancy.

Clancy left home in the late 1940s to join the Royal Air Force (RAF) where he travelled all over Europe, including Greece and Egypt where he learned many folk songs. He later joined his older brothers Paddy Clancy and Tom Clancy in New York City, where they worked as actors. The trio would sometimes sing, informally beginning the group later known as the Clancy Brothers.

In 1955 Bobby returned to Ireland to settle down and run his father's insurance business. While his youngest brother Liam Clancy took his place in America and officially formed the Clancy Brothers and Tommy Makem with Paddy, Tom Clancy and friend Tommy Makem, Bobby forged his own solo career, as well as performing the other half of two duos with sister Peg Clancy and an American folk singer named Sharon Collen. Bobby and sister Peg Clancy (also known as Peg Power) recorded two albums together, "Songs From Ireland' in 1962 and As We Roved Out in 1964 and toured as a duo, appearing on several Irish television programs in the 1960s, such as As Zosimus Said. The other duo, Bobby Clancy and Sharon Collen, appeared on Irish television's Ballad Session in 1965. According to several newspaper articles on Google News Archives they performed some shows in the United States. As a solo, Bobby brought his show to the small screen with his own TV series on Irish television, When Bobby Clancy Sings.

He married Moira Mooney, a school teacher in the mid-1960s. Together they had four children; three daughters, Aoife in 1966, Roisin in 1967, and Aideen in 1979, and one son, Finbarr in 1970. Aoife Clancy and Finbarr Clancy followed in their father's footsteps and now tour as Irish folk Singers. In 2007, son Finbarr became a member of The High Kings.

== The Clancy Brothers ==
When Tommy Makem left in 1969, Bobby took his place and became a member of the Clancy Brothers for the first time. The four brothers, Paddy, Tom, Bobby and Liam released three studio albums, Clancy Brothers Christmas, Flowers in the Valley and Welcome to Our House. The first two albums were produced under Columbia Records while the latter was released under Audio Fidelity Records.

Bobby's initial tenure with the Clancy Brothers was short-lived. According to fans who spoke with the group over the years, but unverified in the media, he and Liam got into an argument which resulted in Bobby quitting the group. Bobby resumed his solo work, releasing a solo album Good Times When Bobby Clancy Sings and appearing live on a compilation album from a 1974 German Folk Festival, both in 1974. Living in Mattapoisett, Massachusetts in the early 1970s, Bobby made a surprise cameo on his brothers' Brockton, Massachusetts TV special in 1974 where he led the brothers and current fourth member Louis Killen on "Mountain Tay."

In 1976, the Clancy Brothers disbanded for a few months. Liam Clancy and Louis Killen left the group and remaining brothers Paddy and Tom decided to go on a hiatus. In 1977 plans went into motion to regroup and Paddy and Tom asked Bobby to join. The three brothers recruited their nephew, singer-songwriter Robbie O'Connell.

The quartet toured part-time, performing three-month-long tours each year in March, August and November only in the United States. They released two albums, both live, one in 1982 and the other in 1988, Clancy Brothers and Robbie O'Connell Live! and Tunes and Tales of Ireland respectively. During the remaining part of the year, Bobby continued running the insurance business in Carrick-on-Suir and continued performing solo in Ireland.

Youngest brother Liam Clancy rejoined Bobby, Paddy and Robbie in 1990 when brother Tom was diagnosed and later succumbed to stomach cancer in November 1990. The Clancy Brothers and Robbie O'Connell, now Paddy, Bobby and Liam performed more frequently than they had in the 1970s and 1980s, appearing on numerous TV shows in America and Ireland, notably Live with Regis and Kathie Lee in 1991, 1993 and 1995, Bob Dylan's The 30th Anniversary Concert Celebration in 1992, and RTÉ's Lifelines in 1994. The quartet released the group's first studio album in over 20 years, Older But No Wiser, in late 1995, an album title coined by Bobby's wife Moira. Soon after the album's release, Liam Clancy and Robbie O'Connell left the group. Bobby and Paddy continued performing with Bobby's son Finbarr Clancy and friend Eddie Dillon from Boston. This new line-up toured until November 1998 when Paddy died from lung cancer.

== Later years and death ==
Now as a trio, the Clancys and Eddie Dillon recorded two live albums, Clancy Sing-a-Long Songs and Once in a Lifetime: An Evening of Fine Irish Music. Bobby Clancy released an additional two solo albums, The Quiet Land and Make Me a Cup, in 1999 and 2000 on the Ark Albums label, a recording studio and company in Fairhaven, Massachusetts.

In 1999 Bobby was diagnosed with pulmonary fibrosis and by 2000 he was unable to perform on his feet. The trio had to do all their concerts sitting down. By March 2002, he was unable to perform and had to quit a scheduled tour. On 6 September 2002, Bobby Clancy died at the age of 75. He left behind a twin sister, siblings Peg and Liam, his wife, four children, and two grandchildren.

== Solo discography/guest appearances ==
- 1962 – So Early in the Morning – Tradition LP/Rykodisc CD
- 1963 – Peg & Bobby Clancy: Songs From Ireland – Tradition LP/Collectables CD
- 1964 – As We Roved Out – London Globe LP
- 1974 – Irish Folk Festival – Intercord LP/CD
- 1974 – Good Times When Bobby Clancy Sings – Talbot LP
- 1999 – The Quiet Land – ARK CD
- 1999 – Clancy Sing Along Songs – ARK CD
- 1999 – Cherish the Ladies: At Home – RCA Victor CD
- 2000 – Cherish the Ladies: The Girls Won't Leave the Boys Alone – Windham Hill CD
- 2000 – Make Me a Cup – ARK CD
- 2001 – Once in a Lifetime: An Evening of Fine Irish Music – ARK CD (out of print)
- 2002 – Aoife Clancy: Silvery Moon – Appleseed CD

*Other appearances can be found on the Clancy Brothers Discography
