= The Bonnie Lass o' Fyvie =

Scottish folk song

The Bonnie Lass o' Fyvie (Roud # 545) is a Scottish folk song about a thwarted romance between a soldier and a woman. Like many folk songs, the authorship is unattributed, there is no strict version of the lyrics, and it is often referred to by its opening line "There once was a troop o' Irish dragoons". The song is also known by a variety of other names, the most common of them being "Peggy-O", "Fennario", and "The Maid of Fife".

The song depicts Irish dragoons marching through the village of Fyvie, and their captain Ned falling in love with a "lass" (girl or young woman) named Peggy who has yellow hair. The unrequited love of the Irish captain is rejected, because Peggy has no intention to marry a foreigner or a soldier. The captain soon dies due to either a broken heart or battle wounds, possibly both. The historical context is unclear, though the song may allude to the 1644 capture of the Fyvie Castle by James Graham, 1st Marquess of Montrose during the Scottish campaigns of the Wars of the Three Kingdoms. Part of Montrose's Royalist (Cavalier) forces was composed of Irish soldiers, though they did not include dragoons.

== Lyrics ==
Of the many versions, one of the most intricate is:

There once was a troop o' Irish dragoons
Cam marching doon through Fyvie-o
And the captain's fa'en in love wi' a very bonnie lass
And her name it was ca'd pretty Peggy-o

There's many a bonnie lass in the Howe o Auchterless
There's many a bonnie lass in the Garioch
There's many a bonnie Jean in the streets of Aiberdeen
But the floower o' them aw lies in Fyvie-o

O come doon the stairs, Pretty Peggy, my dear
Come doon the stairs, Pretty Peggy-o
Come doon the stairs, comb back your yellow hair
Bid a last farewell to your mammy-o

It's braw, aye it's braw, a captain's lady for to be
And it's braw to be a captain's lady-o
It's braw to ride around and to follow the camp
And to ride when your captain he is ready-o

O I'll give you ribbons, love, and I'll give you rings
I'll give you a necklace of amber-o
I'll give you a silken petticoat with flounces to the knee
If you'll convey me doon to your chamber-o

What would your mother think if she heard the guineas clink
And saw the haut-boys marching all before you o
O little would she think gin she heard the guineas clink
If I followed a soldier laddie-o

I never did intend a soldier's lady for to be
A soldier shall never enjoy me-o
I never did intend to gae tae a foreign land
And I never will marry a soldier-o

I'll drink nae more o your claret wine
I'll drink nae more o your glasses-o
Tomorrow is the day when we maun ride away
So farewell tae your Fyvie lasses-o

The colonel he cried, mount, boys, mount, boys, mount
The captain, he cried, tarry-o
O tarry yet a while, just another day or twa
Til I see if the bonnie lass will marry-o

Twas in the early morning, when we marched awa
And O but the captain he was sorry-o
The drums they did beat o'er the bonnie braes o' Gight
And the band played the bonnie lass of Fyvie-o

Long ere we came to Oldmeldrum toon
We had our captain to carry-o
And long ere we won into the streets of Aberdeen
We had our captain to bury-o

Green grow the birks on bonnie Ythanside
And low lie the lowlands of Fyvie-o
The captain's name was Ned and he died for a maid
He died for the bonnie lass of Fyvie-o

== Meaning ==
The song is about the unrequited love of a captain of Irish dragoons for a beautiful Scottish girl in Fyvie. The narration is in the third person, through the voice of one of the captain's soldiers. The captain promises the girl material comfort and happiness, but the girl refuses the captain's advances saying she would not marry a foreigner or a soldier. The captain subsequently leaves Fyvie. In two different variations of the song, he threatens to burn the town(s) if his offer is rejected, or alternately save the town if his offer is accepted. He later dies of a broken heart, or battle wounds, or possibly both.

Several variations on this theme exist. The soldier also proposes marriage in some versions. Some versions have the girl declare her love for the soldier, but only to be stopped short by a reluctant mother.

You're the one that I adore, Sweet Willy-o,
You're the one that I adore, Sweet Willy-o,
But your fortune is too low,
And I fear my mother would be angry-o.

== Geographical and historical allusions ==
The song is set in Fyvie, a small town with a historic castle in Aberdeenshire, Scotland. Some sources claim that the original song suggests the region of Fife (as the "Fair Maid of Fife"), but the references to the River Ythan, Aberdeen and other locations near Fyvie like Gight, confirm that the original song was set in Fyvie, Scotland.

It is probably better not to read strong historical associations into the song, although it is just possible that the song refers to the capture of the Fyvie Castle by Montrose's Royalist army in 1644. (A large part of this army was Irish, but they were not dragoons.)

== Variants across time and space ==
The oldest known version of the Scottish ballad is called "The Bonnie Lass O' Fyvie". Another early transcribed version is given under the title "Bonnie Barbara-O". An early English version "Handsome Polly-O" is also present, though in slightly different settings. Another English version is called "Pretty Peggy of Derby". The song probably travelled with Scottish immigrants to America. It is recorded in the classic English Folk Songs from the Southern Appalachians by Cecil Sharp. Variants of the song refer to the War of 1812 and the American Civil War. A Dixie version of the song makes the final resting place of the captain to be Louisiana.

The last two stanzas from the Bob Dylan version is typical of such Americanized forms, and goes as follows:

The lieutenant he has gone
The lieutenant he has gone
The lieutenant he has gone, Pretty Peggy-O
The lieutenant he has gone
Long gone
He's a-riding down in Texas with the rodeo.

Well, our captain he is dead
Our captain he is dead
Our captain he is dead, Pretty Peggy-O
Well, our captain he is dead
Died for a maid
He's buried somewheres in Louisiana-O.

Over time, the name of Fyvie also got corrupted, and phonetically similar permutations like "Fennario", "Fernario", "Finario", "Fidio", "Ivory" or "Ireo" were placed in its stead to fit the metre and rhyme. As a result, the song is commonly referred to as "Fennario". The 1960s folk music movement saw "Peggy-O" become a common song in many concerts owing to its clear melody and lilting rhyme.

== Linguistics ==
The song was originally composed and sung in Scots. It then made its way into mainstream English, but retains its Scottish flavour. Words like birk (for birch), lass and bonnie are typically Scots as are words like brae (hill) and braw (splendid). As is typical of such cases, quite a few of the less familiar words degenerated into nonsense words as the song travelled over cultures, the most interesting ones probably being Ethanside for Ythanside (banks of the River Ythan), and brasselgeicht for braes o' Gight (hills of Gight).

== Renditions ==
=== Traditional Recordings ===
Many traditional singers have recorded versions of the song, including Scotsman John Strachan (from close to Fyvie) and the Irish singer Thomas Moran. Many Scottish recordings made by James Madison Carpenter between 1929 and 1934, including one of the Aberdeenshire singer Bell Duncan (1849-1934), can be heard on the Vaughan Williams Memorial Library website.

=== Popular Recordings ===
==== Bob Dylan ====
The Southern American version of the song was arranged for the harmonica by Bob Dylan on his eponymous debut album in 1962, under the title "Pretty Peggy-O". He starts off the song with the introduction "I've been around this whole country but I never yet found Fennario", as a playful remark on the fact that the song has been borrowed and cut off its original "setting". Dylan began playing the song live again in the 90s, using the lyrics and melody of the Grateful Dead version.

==== Joan Baez ====
Joan Baez recorded a lyrical version under the title "Fennario" on her 1963 Vanguard Records album Joan Baez in Concert, Part 2.

==== Simon and Garfunkel ====
Peggy-O by Simon & Garfunkel
24 second sample from Wednesday Morning, 3 A.M.

Simon and Garfunkel also recorded a heavily harmonized arrangement of the song titled "Peggy-O" as part of their Wednesday Morning, 3 A.M. album of 1964 and Columbia Records studio recordings of the 1960s (which was released on the box set The Columbia Studio Recordings (1964-1970) in 2001). Simon and Garfunkel sing the variant of the song where the captain threatens to burn the city down if his advances are refused.

==== The Grateful Dead ====
The Grateful Dead have variously arranged and sung this song on 265 known occasions between 1973 and 1995, using Fen-nar-io and Fi-dio as the name of the place depending on metre constraints. The place Fennario is also mentioned in their song "Dire Wolf", on the album Workingman's Dead. The song was titled "Peggy-O", and was sung by Jerry Garcia using the following lyrics:

As we rode out to Fennario
As we rode out to Fennario
Our captain fell in love with a lady like a dove
And he called her by name pretty Peggy-O

Will you marry me, pretty Peggy-O
Will you marry me, pretty Peggy-O
If you will marry me, I will set your cities free
And free all the ladies in the area-O

I would marry you, sweet William-O
I would marry you, sweet William-O
I would marry you, but your guineas are too few
And I feel my mama would be angry-O

What would your mama think, pretty Peggy-O
What would your mama think, pretty Peggy-O
What would your mama think if she heard my guineas clink
And saw me marching at the head of my soldiers-O

If ever I return, pretty Peggy-O
If ever I return, pretty Peggy-O
If ever I return, your cities I will burn
Destroy all the ladies in the area-O

Come stepping down the stairs, pretty Peggy-O
Come stepping down the stairs, pretty Peggy-O
Come stepping down the stairs, combing back your yellow hair
And bid a last farewell to your William-O

Sweet William he is dead, pretty Peggy-O
Sweet William he is dead, pretty Peggy-O
Sweet William he is dead, and he died for a maid
And he's buried in the Louisiana country-O

As we rode out to Fennario
As we rode out to Fennario
Our captain fell in love with a lady like a dove
And he called her by name pretty Peggy-O

The song appears as "Fennario" on the reissue of Jerry Garcia's album Run for the Roses. Following the Grateful Dead's disbandment in 1995 after Garcia's death, "Peggy-O" continued to be performed by offshoot bands including Bob Weir & RatDog, Phil Lesh & Friends, the Other Ones, the Dead, BK3, Furthur, Billy & the Kids, Dead & Company, and Bob Weir & Wolf Bros.

==== Other artists ====
- The Clancy Brothers recorded the song as "The Maid of Fife-E-O" on the 1961 album, The Clancy Brothers and Tommy Makem, and later as "Maid of Fife" on their 1965 album, Recorded Live in Ireland, with Tommy Makem and on their 1973 album, Greatest Hits, with Louis Killen.
- The Journeymen (John Phillips, Scott McKenzie, Richard Weissman) recorded a version with an American Civil War context as "Fennario" on their 1961 debut album The Journeymen (Capitol Records ST 1629).
- Judy Collins recorded a version as "Fannerio" on her 1962 album Golden Apples of the Sun.
- Hoyt Axton recorded a version of "Peggy O" for the album Greenback Dollar (1963).
- The Chad Mitchell Trio recorded a variant (in which the colonel shoots the captain after the call to tarry) on their 1963 album Singin' Our Minds under the title, "Bonny Streets of Fyve-io".
- Les Compagnons De La Chanson released a cover version in French on a 7-inch EP, under the title "Peggy O" in 1963.
- The Corries recorded a version on their first album in 1964.
- Bob Lind included a similar version of the song, but under the title "Fennario", on the Verve album The Elusive Bob Lind, released in 1966.
- Martin Carthy recorded a song sharing some lyrics, but with a quite different tune and narrative arc, called "Handsome Polly-O" on his album Shearwater in 1972.
- The Black Watch included "Lass of Fyve" on their 1975 album Scotch on the Rocks, sung by a trio with the pipes and drums joining in at the end of the song.
- WWE recorded a version of the song to serve as the entrance theme for Rowdy Roddy Piper, replacing Scotland the Brave.
- The Aberdeen-based group, Old Blind Dogs covered the song on their New Tricks album in 1992.
- Malinky, with lead vocals by Karine Polwart, included "The Bonnie Lass of Fyvie"' on their 2000 album Last Leaves.
- "Peggy-O" has been covered by the bluegrass band Trampled By Turtles, such as at their 10,000 Lakes Festival performance in 2007.
- Jefferson Starship recorded a version of "Frenario" for the 2008 album Jefferson's Tree of Liberty.
- The Irish Rovers recorded the song on The Irish Rovers' Gems.
- Antonio Breschi arranged the song as "Fennario" on his album Songs of the North in 1996.
- The National recorded the song for the Grateful Dead tribute Day of the Dead in 2015.
- Iona Fyfe released a Scots version of the song with the title Bonnie Lass of Fyvie on January 29, 2020.
- Vampire Weekend performed a version of the song on SiriusXM.
- The Mountain Goats' "Going to Fennario", which also references Sweet William, was inspired by the Grateful Dead version and released ahead of schedule on 16 January 2026 in memory of Bob Weir, who had died the previous week. The song was featured on the album Days in August 2026.
