= Isn't It Grand Boys =

Studio album by The Clancy Brothers and Tommy Makem
- Released: 21 February 1966
- Recorded: December 1965; New York City
- Genre: Irish folk
- Labels: Columbia; CL 2477 (mono); CS 9277 (stereo)
- Producer: David Rubinson

The Clancy Brothers and Tommy Makem chronology
Recorded Live in Ireland (1965)	Isn't It Grand Boys (1966)	Freedom's Sons (1966)

Singles from Isn't It Grand Boys
- 1. "Isn't It Grand Boys"/"Nancy Whisky"

Isn't It Grand Boys is a 1966 studio album by the Clancy Brothers and Tommy Makem. It was the Irish folk group's seventh album for Columbia Records and their tenth album over all. Tommy Makem wrote the liner notes.

The album reached #22 on the UK Albums Chart on 16 April 1966. It remained on the chart for five weeks.

== Reception ==
New York Times music critic, Robert Shelton, praised the album for its sound quality and presence. About the singing, he noted: "The ensemble efforts have just enough polish to show a firm professionalism, and just enough rough edges to retain a native folk quality." He singled out the songs "Nancy Whisky," "Isn't It Grand Boys," and "Westering Ho" for their "hearty virility."

== Track listing ==
All songs are traditional and were adapted and arranged by The Clancy Brothers and Tommy Makem, except where noted.

Side one
No.	Title	Lead vocals	Length
1.	"Nancy Whisky"	Each singer has a solo verse	2:53
2.	"Galway Races"	Liam Clancy	2:08
3.	"What Would You Do If You Married A Soldier"	Tom Clancy	1:03
4.	"Eileen Aroon"	Liam Clancy	3:36
5.	"Isn't It Grand Boys"	Each singer has a solo verse	2:58

Side two
No.	Title	Lead vocals	Length
1.	"Galway City"	No solos	2:12
2.	"My Son Ted" (arranged by Joan Clancy)	Paddy Clancy	1:54
3.	"Westering Ho"	No solos	1:33
4.	"The Cobbler" (arranged by Tommy Makem)	Tommy Makem	2:57
5.	"Mingulay Boat Song"	Tommy Makem	2:49
6.	"O'Donnell Abu"	No solos	1:40

== Personnel ==
- Paddy Clancy - vocals, harmonica
- Tom Clancy - vocals
- Liam Clancy - vocals, guitar
- Tommy Makem - vocals, banjo, tin whistle
