= The Butcher's Boy (folk song) =

American folk song

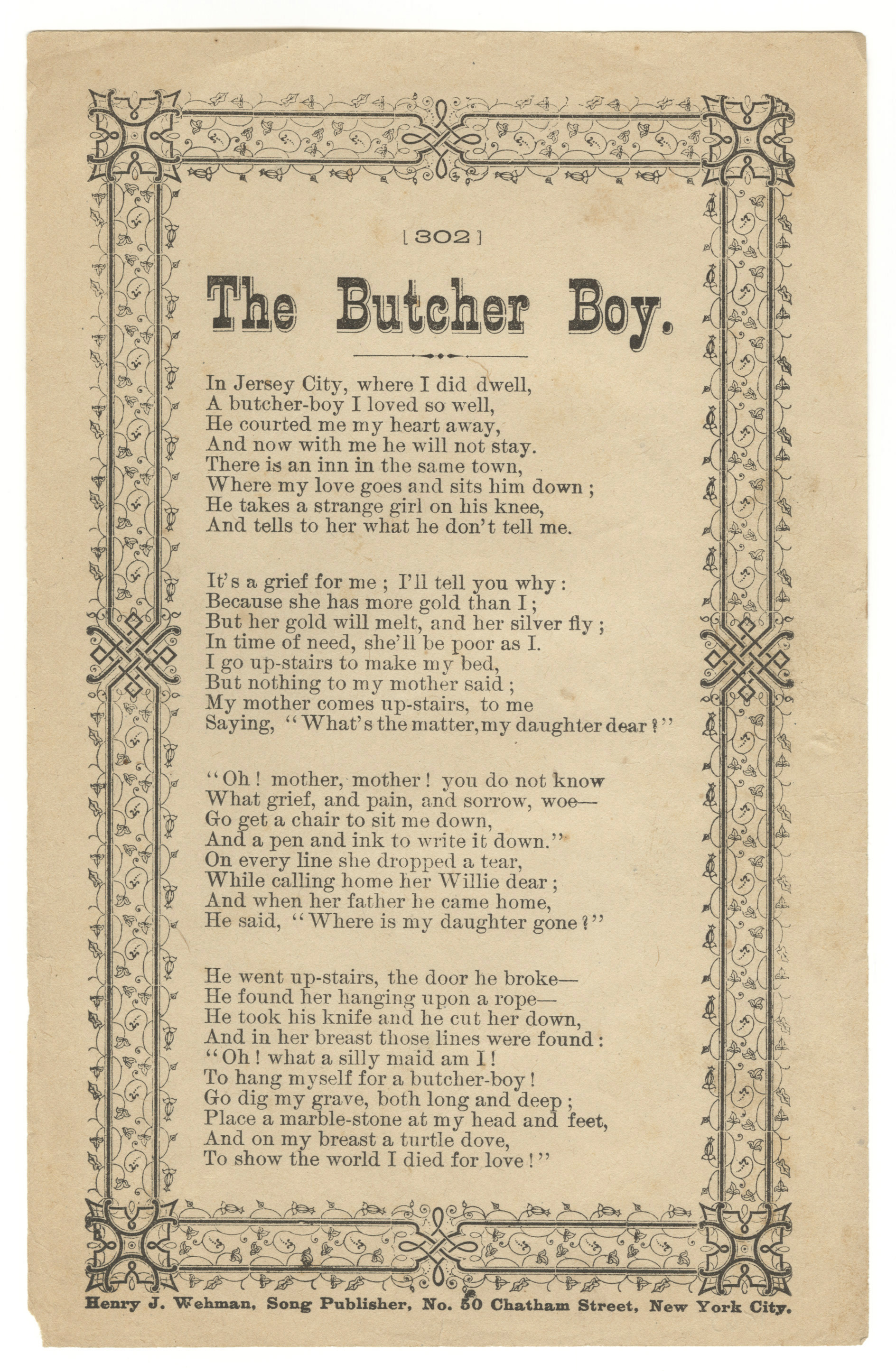
- A broadside print of the song published in New York City during the 1890s.

Song
- Genre: Broadside ballad, folksong
- Songwriter: Unknown

"The Butcher’s Boy" or "The Butcher Boy" (Laws P24, Roud 409) is an American folk song derived from traditional English ballads. Folklorists of the early 20th century considered it to be a conglomeration of several English broadside ballads, tracing its stanzas to "Sheffield Park", "The Squire's Daughter", "A Brisk Young Soldier", "A Brisk Young Sailor" and "Sweet William (The Sailor Boy)" and "Died for Love".

Steve Roud describes it as, "One of the most widely-known 'forsaken girl' songs in the American tradition, which is often particularly moving in its stark telling of an age-old story."

In the song, a butcher's apprentice abandons his lover, or is unfaithful toward her. The lover hangs herself and is discovered by her father. She leaves a suicide note, which prescribes that she be buried with a turtle dove placed upon her breast, to show the world she died for love. This narrative use of the turtle dove is derived from Old World symbolism; it is analogous to the folksong interment motif of a rose, briar, or lily growing out of the neighboring graves of deceased lovers. In this respect, "Butcher's Boy" is related to the ballads "Earl Brand", "Fair Margaret and Sweet William", "Lord Thomas and Fair Annet", "Barbara Allen", and "Lord Lovel".

Commercial recordings have been made by Kelly Harrell, by Buell Kazee (frequently re-issued, notably in the Anthology of American Folk Music) and by the Blue Sky Boys.

== Variations ==
In some versions of the story, the heroine is impregnated by her lover before being abandoned. In others, he leaves her for a woman who is wealthier than she.

The final line of the song often differs between some versions. For example, some lyrics include "till cherries grow on an apple tree." The location of the song also varies in certain versions; some set the song in More Street, or London City.

The ballad has been popularly covered by commercially successful artists. Joan Baez followed the text of Buell Kazee, and therefore changed the title to "The Railroad Boy." Jean Ritchie recorded her adaptation of this song with Doc Watson as "Go Dig My Grave." Tommy Makem learned the version sung by his mother Sarah Makem, and recorded it both on a solo album and with The Clancy Brothers. Kirsty MacColl also recorded the song, and Sinéad O'Connor recorded it for the soundtrack of the film The Butcher Boy.

The ballad's tune is used for the American song "The Ballad of the Green Berets" by Barry Sadler.

== Recordings ==
- Kelly Harrell "Butcher's Boy" 1925.
- Henry Whitter "Butcher Boy" 1925.
- Vernon Dalhart "The Butcher's Boy" 1927
- Jeff Calhoun "The Butcher Boy" 1927.
- Carson Robison "The Butcher Boy" 1928.
- Bradley Kincaid "Butcher Boy" 1928.
- Buell Kazee "The Butcher's Boy (The Railroad Boy)" 1928. Vocal solo with 5-string banjo. Original Issue Brunswick 213A (032)
- Buell Kazee "The Butcher's Boy" recorded in New York: January 16, 1928. Included on Anthology of American Folk Music: Smithsonian Folkways Recordings 1997.
- Ephraim Woodie & The Henpecked Husbands "The Fatal Courtship" 1929.
- The Blue Sky Boys "The Butcher's Boy" 1940.
- Peggy Seeger "The Butcher Boy" on Songs of Courting and Complaint 1955.
- Joan Baez "The Railroad Boy" on Joan Baez Volume 2 1961.
- Tommy Makem "The Butcher Boy" on Songs of Tommy Makem 1961.
- Jean Ritchie "Go Dig My Grave" on Precious Memories 1962.
- Vern Smeiser "The Butcher's Boy" 1963 on Art of Field Recording Volume 2.
- Jean Ritchie and Doc Watson "Go Dig My Grave" on Jean Ritchie and Doc Watson Live at Folk City 1963.
- The Goldebriars "The Railroad Boy" 1964 on The Goldebriars.
- Tommy Makem with The Clancy Brothers "The Butcher Boy" on Recorded Live in Ireland.1965.
- Sarah Makem "The Butcher Boy" 1967 on The Voice of the People: Sarah Makem: The Heart Is True.
- Caroline Hughes "The Butcher Boy" 1968 on The Voice of the People: I'm A Romany Rai.
- Ryan's Fancy "The Butcher Boy" on Newfoundland Drinking Songs 1973.
- Bob Dylan & Joan Baez "Railroad Boy" on Rolling Thunder Revue: The 1976 Live Recordings 2026.
- Kirsty MacColl "The Butcher Boy" on Caroline 1995.
- Sinéad O'Connor "The Butcher Boy" on The Butcher Boy (soundtrack) 1997.
- Lambchop "The Butcher Boy" on Nixon 2000.
- Dave Van Ronk "The Butcher Boy" on Dave Van Ronk: The Mayor of MacDougal Street 2005.
- Lau "Butcher Boy" on Lightweights and Gentlemen 2007.
- Elvis Costello "The Butcher's Boy" on The Harry Smith Project: Anthology of American Folk Music Revisited 2006.
- Kronos Quartet and Natalie Merchant "The Butcher's Boy" on Folk Songs (Kronos Quartet album) 2017.
- Susanna Wallumrød "Go Dig My Grave" on Go Dig My Grave 2018.
- The Mary Wallopers "The Butcher Boy" 2022.
- Lankum "Go Dig My Grave" on False Lankum 2023.
- Tilda Swinton & Tarwater (band) on Sick Bag Song (Audio Play) 2023.
