= The Rocks of Bawn =

Irish traditional folk song

The Rocks of Bawn is an Irish traditional folk song, originating in County Cavan in the early 18th century. It has been catalogued in the Roud Folk Song Index, as number 3024. It has been recorded and sung publicly by numerous Irish folk singers.

The meaning of the song has been debated, but may refer to the displacement of native Irish farmers from their traditional lands during the reign of Oliver Cromwell, as some versions reference Patrick Sarsfield, 1st Earl of Lucan, a Jacobite leader during the 17th century.

"In 1790, Rev. Patrick Dillon served as parish priest of Mullahoran. Without a church building, his altar was the Rocks of Bawn, where parishioners gathered in secrecy for Mass. This sacred site became famous through the ballad of the widow Bawn O'Reilly and her workman John Sweeney of Glan." Source: Our Parish, Our Faith: A Legacy of Clergy and Commitment in Mullahoran and Loughduff" published 2025 by the 6th class of Mullahoran Parish.

The following is outdated as of 20 June 2026: Moreover, the location of the eponymous Rocks of Bawn has been a source of discussion and curiosity for many years. Frank McNally of the Irish Times attempted to locate them, and decided that multiple sites could be considered, but the song's age precluded answering with any certainty.

== Lyrics ==
Come all you loyal heroes wherever you might be
Don’t hire with any master till you know what your work will be
For he will rise you early from the clear daylight till dawn
And you never will be able for to plough the Rocks of Bawn

Oh, rise up lovely Sweeney and give your horse some hay
and give him out a feed of oats before you start the day
Don’t feed him on soft turnips, take him to yon green lawn
And then he will be able for to plough the Rocks of Bawn

Well, my curse attend you Sweeney, you have me nearly robbed
you’re sitting by the fire side with your dúidín in your gob
Sitting by the fire side from the clear daylight till dawn
And you never will be able for to plough the Rocks of Bawn

Oh I wish the Queen of England would send for me in time
And place me in some regiment all in my youth and prime
And I’d fight for Ireland’s glory from the clear daylight till dawn
And I never will return again for to plough the Rocks Of Bawn

== Performances ==
- The Clancy Brothers and Tommy Makem
- Joe Heaney
- Christy Moore
- Paul Brady
- Liam O'Flynn
- Séamus Ennis
- The Jolly Rogers
- Lankum (as "The Rocks of Palestine")
