= The Clancy Brothers' Greatest Hits =

Studio album by The Clancy Brothers
- Released: 1973, re-release 1986
- Genre: Irish folk music
- Length: 1:04:11
- Label: Vanguard

The Clancy Brothers chronology
Live on St. Patrick's Day (1973)	The Clancy Brothers' Greatest Hits (1973)	The Clancy Brothers and Robbie O'Connell Live! (1982)

Professional ratings
Review scores
Source	Rating
Allmusic	link

The Clancy Brothers' Greatest Hits is an original studio album of some of The Clancy Brothers' most popular hits re-recorded with Louis Killen. The Clancys had performed each of these songs previously with different arrangements with their former partner Tommy Makem in the 1960s. This was the group's first of three albums for Vanguard Records, their last album with Killen, and the final album they would release for almost a decade. The recording was initially released as a double album. A backing musician on a few of the tracks is Don McLean, best known for his song "American Pie".

In 2000, Vanguard re-released the album on a CD entitled The Best of the Vanguard Years. In addition to including the entirety of the Greatest Hits album, the CD included four previously unreleased tracks from the Clancy Brothers' follow-up album Live! (1982).

== Track listing ==
1. "Maid of Fife" – 2:19
2. "Jug of Punch" – 2:55
3. "Gallant Forty-Twa" – 2:15
4. "Whistling Gypsy" – 3:11
5. "The Leaving of Liverpool" – 3:50
6. "Mountain Dew" – 1:45
7. "The Nightingale" – 3:27
8. "Roddy McCorley" – 3:11
9. "Castle of Dramore" – 2:46
10. "Father's Grave" – 2:08
11. "Johnny McAdoo" – 1:39
12. "The Irish Rover" – 2:58
13. "Old Woman from Wexford" – 1:59
14. "Bonnie Charlie" – 4:35
15. "Jolly Tinker" – 1:52
16. "Haul Away Joe" – 2:18
17. "The Shoals of Herring" – 3:32
18. "The Mermaid" – 2:41
19. "Kelly-The Boy from Killarn" – 2:31
20. "Rosin the Bow" – 2:48
21. "Whiskey is the Life of Man" – 2:44
22. "MacPherson's Lament" – 3:08
23. "Whiskey You're the Devil" – 2:12
24. "Holy Ground" – 2:02
