= The 30th Anniversary Concert Celebration =

1993 Bob Dylan anniversary live album

Live album by various artists
- Released: August 24, 1993
- Recorded: October 16, 1992
- Venues: Madison Square Garden, New York City
- Genre: Rock
- Length: 148:24
- Label: Columbia
- Producers: Jeff Kramer; Jeff Rosen; Don DeVito

Bob Dylan chronology
| Good as I Been to You (1992) | The 30th Anniversary Concert Celebration (1993) | World Gone Wrong (1993) |

Professional ratings
Review scores
| Source | Rating |
|---|---|
| AllMusic | 4.5/5 stars |
| The Encyclopedia of Popular Music | 3/5 stars |

The 30th Anniversary Concert Celebration is a live double-album release in recognition of Bob Dylan's 30 years as a recording artist. Recorded on October 16, 1992, at Madison Square Garden in New York City, it captures most of the concert, which featured many artists performing classic Dylan songs, before ending with three songs from Dylan himself.

The house band for the show were the surviving members of Booker T. & the M.G.'s: Booker T. Jones on organ, Donald "Duck" Dunn on bass, and Steve Cropper on guitar. Joining them was drummer Anton Fig filling in for the late Al Jackson, plus drummer Jim Keltner. Longtime Saturday Night Live bandleader and initial lead guitar player in Dylan's Never Ending Tour G. E. Smith served as the music director of the whole event as well as a sideman on guitar and mandolin for several artists. Background singers were Sheryl Crow and Sue Medley among others.

The 30th Anniversary Concert Celebration, which reached No. 40 (in the US and went gold), was released in August 1993 just before Dylan was about to deliver his second folk studio set inside of a year, World Gone Wrong. The concert was dubbed "Bobfest" by Neil Young at the beginning of his "All Along the Watchtower" cover.

A VHS collection of the same name was released on August 25, 1993. On March 4, 2014, the concert was released in Deluxe Edition 2-DVD and Blu-ray sets with bonus performances and behind-the-scenes rehearsal footage, as well as a 2-CD set with two bonus rehearsal tracks.

== Track listing ==
All tracks are written by Bob Dylan.

Disc one
| No. | Title | Performer(s) | Length |
|---|---|---|---|
| 1. | "Like a Rolling Stone" | John Cougar Mellencamp | 6:53 |
| 2. | "Leopard-Skin Pill-Box Hat" | John Cougar Mellencamp | 4:20 |
| 3. | "Introduction" | Kris Kristofferson | 0:55 |
| 4. | "Blowin' in the Wind" | Stevie Wonder | 8:53 |
| 5. | "Foot of Pride" | Lou Reed | 8:47 |
| 6. | "Masters of War" | Eddie Vedder and Mike McCready of Pearl Jam | 5:06 |
| 7. | "The Times They Are A-Changin'" | Tracy Chapman | 3:01 |
| 8. | "It Ain't Me Babe" | June Carter Cash and Johnny Cash | 3:50 |
| 9. | "What Was It You Wanted" | Willie Nelson | 5:47 |
| 10. | "I'll Be Your Baby Tonight" | Kris Kristofferson | 3:04 |
| 11. | "Highway 61 Revisited" | Johnny Winter | 5:05 |
| 12. | "Seven Days" | Ronnie Wood | 5:26 |
| 13. | "Just Like a Woman" | Richie Havens | 5:50 |
| 14. | "When the Ship Comes In" | The Clancy Brothers, Robbie O'Connell and Tommy Makem | 4:23 |
| 15. | "You Ain't Going Nowhere" | Mary Chapin Carpenter, Rosanne Cash and Shawn Colvin | 3:52 |
| 16. | "Don't Think Twice, It's All Right" (rehearsal bonus track from the 2014 Remastered Deluxe Edition) | Eric Clapton | 6:27 |
| Total length: | | | 81:39 |

Disc two
| No. | Title | Performer(s) | Length |
|---|---|---|---|
| 1. | "Just Like Tom Thumb's Blues" | Neil Young | 5:38 |
| 2. | "All Along the Watchtower" | Neil Young | 6:20 |
| 3. | "I Shall Be Released" | Chrissie Hynde | 4:26 |
| 4. | "Don't Think Twice, It's All Right" | Eric Clapton | 6:09 |
| 5. | "Emotionally Yours" | The O'Jays | 5:43 |
| 6. | "When I Paint My Masterpiece" | The Band | 4:23 |
| 7. | "Absolutely Sweet Marie" | George Harrison | 4:43 |
| 8. | "License to Kill" | Tom Petty and the Heartbreakers | 4:52 |
| 9. | "Rainy Day Women #12 & 35" | Tom Petty and the Heartbreakers | 4:44 |
| 10. | "Mr. Tambourine Man" | Roger McGuinn with Tom Petty and the Heartbreakers | 4:10 |
| 11. | "It's Alright, Ma (I'm Only Bleeding)" | Bob Dylan | 6:21 |
| 12. | "My Back Pages" | Bob Dylan, Roger McGuinn, Tom Petty, Neil Young, Eric Clapton and George Harrison | 4:39 |
| 13. | "Knockin' on Heaven's Door" | All | 5:38 |
| 14. | "Girl from the North Country" | Bob Dylan | 5:12 |
| 15. | "I Believe in You" (rehearsal bonus track from the 2014 Remastered Deluxe Edition) | Sinéad O'Connor | 6:20 |
| Total length: | | | 79:18 |

== Personnel ==
- Bob Dylan – guitar, vocals, harmonica

=== Additional musicians ===
- The Band
  - Rick Danko – guitar, bass guitar, vocals
  - Levon Helm – mandolin, vocals
  - Garth Hudson – accordion
  - Richard Bell – accordion
  - Randy Ciarlante - drums, vocals
  - Jim Weider – guitar, vocals
- Jerry Barnes – choir, chorus
- Katreese Barnes – choir, chorus
- Mary Chapin Carpenter – guitar, vocals
- John Cascella – accordion, keyboards
- Johnny Cash – vocals
- June Carter Cash – vocals
- Rosanne Cash – guitar, vocals
- Tracy Chapman – guitar, vocals
- The Clancy Brothers
  - Bobby Clancy – bodhrán, vocals
  - Liam Clancy – guitar, vocals
  - Paddy Clancy – harmonica, vocals
- Eric Clapton – guitar, vocals
- Leotis Clyburn – choir, chorus
- Dennis Collins – background vocals, choir, chorus
- Shawn Colvin – guitar, vocals
- Steve Cropper – guitar
- Sheryl Crow – background vocals, choir, chorus
- Donald "Duck" Dunn – bass guitar
- Ron Fair – piano
- Anton Fig – percussion, drums
- Lisa Germano – violin
- Nanci Griffith – guitar, vocals (home video edition only)
- David Grissom – guitar
- George Harrison – guitar, vocals
- Richie Havens – guitar, vocals
- Sophie B. Hawkins – vocals
- Carolyn Hester – vocals
- Cissy Houston – choir, chorus
- Chrissie Hynde – guitar, vocals
- Darryl Keith John – background vocals
- Booker T. Jones – organ
- Jim Keltner – drums
- Brenda King – background vocals, choir, chorus
- Curtis King – background vocals, choir, chorus
- Al Kooper – organ
- Kris Kristofferson – guitar, vocals
- Tommy Makem – banjo, vocals
- Kerry Marx – guitar
- Mike McCready – guitar
- Roger McGuinn – guitar, vocals
- Sue Medley – background vocals
- John Mellencamp – vocals
- Willie Nelson – guitar, vocals
- Robbie O'Connell – guitar, vocals
- Sinéad O'Connor – vocals
- Christine Ohlman – background vocals, choir, chorus
- The O'Jays
  - Eddie Levert – vocals
  - Sam Strain – vocals
  - Walter Williams – vocals
- Pat Peterson – percussion, background vocals
- Tom Petty and the Heartbreakers
  - Mike Campbell – guitar
  - Howie Epstein – guitar, lap-steel guitar, bass guitar, vocals
  - Stan Lynch – drums
  - Tom Petty – guitar, vocals
  - Benmont Tench – organ
- Mickey Raphael – harmonica
- Lou Reed – guitar, vocals
- G. E. Smith – music director, guitar, mandolin, bass
- Cesar Diaz – Guitar & Amp Tech
- George Thorogood – guitar
- Eddie Vedder – vocals
- Mike Wanchic – guitar
- Don Was – bass guitar
- Johnny Winter – guitar, vocals
- Stevie Wonder – harmonica, piano, vocals
- Ronnie Wood – guitar, vocals
- Neil Young – guitar, vocals
- Reggie Young – guitar

=== Technical ===
Jeff Kramer- production

- Don DeVito – production
- Jeff Rosen – production

David Hewitt Engineer Remote Recording Services Silver Truck

- David Thoener – mixing
- Kevin Wall – executive production
- Lou Volpano – Project Manager
- David Wild – liner notes

== Certifications ==
| Region | Certification | Certified units/sales |
|---|---|---|
| Australia (ARIA) video | Gold | 7,500^{^} |
| United States (RIAA) | Gold | 500,000^{^} |
^{^} Shipments figures based on certification alone.

== See also ==
- List of songs written by Bob Dylan
- List of artists who have covered Bob Dylan songs
