= Songs from Ireland (Peg and Bobby Clancy album) =

Studio album by Peg and Bobby Clancy
- Released: 1962
- Genre: Folk music
- Label: Tradition TLP 1045

Songs from Ireland is a 1962 album by sister and brother Peg and Bobby Clancy. It was Bob's second solo album, alongside his recordings with The Clancy Brothers and Peg's only album. The album was well received, and was reissued in 1972 on Ember 2054, and digitally remastered for CD in 2011.

== Track listing ==
1. "On the Banks of the Roses"
2. "The Jail of Clonmel"
3. "Soldier Soldier"
4. "Willie Crotty"
5. "The Woman from Wexford"
6. "The Bonny Boy"
7. "Me Grandfather Died"
8. "I Know Where I'm Going"
9. "I'll Tell Me Ma"
10. "Maderine Rue" (Little Red Fox)
11. "The Bonny Bunch of Roses-O"
12. "The Cobbler"
13. "Bungle Rye"
14. "All around the Loney-O"
15. "She Didn't Dance"
16. "Love and Porter"
