= When the Ship Comes In =

Song by Bob Dylan

from the album The Times They Are a-Changin'
- Released: January 13, 1964
- Recorded: October 23, 1963
- Genre: Folk
- Length: 3:18
- Label: Columbia
- Songwriter: Bob Dylan
- Producer: Tom Wilson

"When the Ship Comes In" is a folk song by Bob Dylan, released on his third album, The Times They Are a-Changin', in 1964.

== Background and composition ==
Joan Baez states in the 2005 documentary film No Direction Home that the song was inspired by a hotel clerk who refused to allow Dylan a room due to his "unwashed" appearance (he was not famous outside of the folk movement at this time). The song then grew into a sprawling epic allegory about vanquishing the oppressive "powers that be." Another inspiration was the Bertolt Brecht/Kurt Weill song, "Pirate Jenny".

According to biographer Clinton Heylin, "When the Ship Comes In" was written in August 1963 "in a fit of pique, in a hotel room, after his unkempt appearance had led an impertinent hotel clerk to refuse him admission until his companion, Joan Baez, had vouched for his good character". Heylin speculates that "Jenny's Song" from Brecht and Weill's Threepenny Opera was also an inspiration: "As Pirate Jenny dreams of the destruction of all her enemies by a mysterious ship, so Dylan envisages the neophobes being swept aside in 'the hour when the ship comes in'." Dylan's former girlfriend Suze Rotolo recalls that her "interest in Brecht was certainly an influence on him. I was working for the Circle in the Square Theater and he came to listen all the time. He was very affected by the song that Lotte Lenya's known for, 'Pirate Jenny'."

The lyrics include Biblical references, such as the drowning of Pharaoh and his people in the Red Sea and the defeat of Goliath. Some of the lyrics are said to have been inspired by Dylan Thomas' poem "Fernhill" (Bob Dylan took his stagename from this Welsh poet).

== Live performances ==
Shortly after Dylan wrote the song, he and Baez performed it together at the March on Washington on August 28, 1963, as heard on Dylan's Live 1962-1966: Rare Performances From The Copyright Collections album (2018). Dylan later performed the song at Carnegie Hall on October 26, 1963; this performance was included on The Bootleg Series Vol. 7: No Direction Home: The Soundtrack (2005).

Dylan performed the song during Live Aid on July 13, 1985, accompanied by Keith Richards and Ron Wood of the Rolling Stones.

The song was performed by the Clancy Brothers at The 30th Anniversary Concert Celebration, at Madison Square Garden in New York City on October 16, 1992.

== Other versions ==
An early demo version, in which Dylan plays piano rather than guitar, was released in the 2010 compilation The Bootleg Series Vol. 9: The Witmark Demos: 1962–1964. In a review of the compilation for The A.V. Club, Keith Phipps singled the track out, writing that "the lo-fi version ... has its own intimate hold. [Dylan] sounds like what he was beneath the myth he was already constructing for himself." Siddarth Cidambi wrote in The Stanford Daily that the demo's firmer vocals and simple piano accompaniment make it "all the more beautiful".

Peter, Paul and Mary released "When the Ship Comes In" as a single in 1965. Billboard described this version as an "exciting rouser from the pen of Bob Dylan with an outstanding performance by the trio." Cash Box described it as "a rhythmic, fast-moving bluesy ditty on warm-hearted somewhat euphoric theme." Record World called it "a moving Bob Dylan song" and that there is "joy, joy, joy in [the trio's] voices."

In 1972, Arlo Guthrie recorded the song for the album Hobo's Lullaby, with an organ backing Guthrie. The Pogues recorded it on their 1996 album Pogue Mahone, as an upbeat Irish-trad tune with Spider Stacy on vocals.
