= The Gallant Forty Twa =

"The Gallant Forty Twa" is a traditional Scottish song associated with the 42nd Foot regiment known as the Black Watch. It is generally dated to the mid-19th century, although it may have been based on an older tune from Ulster. It was reportedly sung by soldiers from the regiment during the Dunkirk evacuation.

The song was revived by the Irish folk group The Clancy Brothers in the 1960s. It has also been recorded by Ryan's Fancy and Andy Stewart.
