= Sarah Makem =

Irish singer

Sarah Makem (18 October 1900 – 20 April 1983) was a traditional Irish singer from Keady, County Armagh, Northern Ireland. She was married to fiddler Peter Makem and was the mother of musicians Tommy Makem and Jack Makem. Several of her descendants also became musicians, including members of The Makem Brothers and Barley Bree. Makem and her cousin Annie Jane Kelly were members of the Singing Greenes of Keady, a local family singing tradition.

In the 1950s, song collectors from the United States toured Ireland recording its musical heritage. Makem was visited and recorded by, among others, Diane Guggenheim Hamilton, Jean Ritchie, Peter Kennedy and Sean O'Boyle. Her rendition of "As I Roved Out" opened the BBC Radio folk music programme of the same name in the 1950s.

== Background ==
Sarah Makem lived in Keady her whole life. Living in the border region of Ulster and in a market town, she was influenced by Irish, Scottish, and English traditions. Makem learned songs from her mother while she was doing household chores such as cooking. Makem would often pick up these songs while sitting with her mother after just one repetition. Makem also learned some of her repertoire from songs the children would sing in school.

Sarah left school early to work as a factory weaver as many of the girls did in her town. She would work from 7 am to 6:30 pm then come home to have sessions with many of the other musicians living in the same area. Makem married Peter Makem in 1919.

== Musical career ==
Sarah Makem would not consider herself a musician; however, she had an extensive musical career. She was a ballad singer who had over five hundred songs in memory. These songs she describes as life stories of murder and love and emigration songs. Makem recorded many of her songs, mostly for collection purposes. One of those songs, "As I Roved Out" was used to open a BBC radio program featuring Irish folk music named after Makem's ballad. Makem did not intend to use this recording as such, and was very embarrassed to know her voice would be heard everyday across Ireland.

== Songs ==
Note: Footnotes take you to lyrics, but not necessarily to the recordings of Sarah Makem, as many of the songs are traditional.

Makem collected, performed and/or composed, and handed down hundreds of songs including:

- "As I Roved Out"
- "Barbara Allen"
- "Barney Mavourneen"
- "Blow Ye Winds"
- "The Butcher Boy"
- "Caroline and her Young Sailor Bold"
- "The Cobbler"
- "The Cot in the Corner"
- "Derry Gaol"
- "Dobbin's Flowery Vale"
- "The Factory Girl"
- "Farewell My Love, Remember Me"
- "I Courted a Wee Girl"
- "John Mitchel"
- "The Jolly Thresher"
- "Little Beggarman"
- "Magpie's Nest"
- "A Man in Love He Feels No Cold"
- "Mary of Kilmore"
- "May Morning Dew"
- "Month of January" ("The Forsaken Mother & Child")
- "On the Banks of Red Roses"
- "Our Ship She's Ready to Bear Away"
- "Robert Burns and his Highland Mary"
- "A Servant Maid in her Father's Garden"
- "Willie Reilly"
- "The Wind That Shakes the Barley"

== Recordings ==
Sarah Makem has been recorded extensively, and is included on the following recordings:

- Derry Gaol and talk about the song (14/7/1952) – Sarah Makem [From the BBC collection, collected by Sean O'Boyle and Peter Kennedy]
- Field Trip (1954) – Jean Ritchie
- The Lark in the Morning – Liam Clancy and others (1956)
- Ulster Ballad Singer (1967) – Sarah Makem
- Best of the Clancy Brothers (1994) – The Clancy Brothers
- Sea Songs & Shanties (1994) – Various Artists
- Traditional Songs of Ireland (1995) – Various Artists
- Ancient Celtic Roots (1996) – Various Artists
- Celtic Mouth Music (1997) – Various Artists
- Irish Voices: The Best in Traditional Singing (1997) – Various Artists
- Celtic Reflections (1998) – Various Artists
- Celtic Voices (1999) – Various Artists
- The Voice of the People, Vol. 1

Come Let Us Buy the License (1999) – Various Artists.

- The Voice of the People Vol. 8: A Story I’m Just About to Tell (1999) – Various Artists
- The Voice Of The People, Vol 10: Who's That At My Bedroom Window – Songs Of Love & Amorous Encounters – Topic Records 1998/1999 – Various Artists.
- The Voice of the People Vol. 17: It Fell on a Day a Bonny Summer Day (1999) – Various Artists
- The Voice of the People: A Selection (2000) – Various Artists
- The Voice Of The People: Good People, Take Warning – Ballads sung by British & Irish Traditional Singers. 2011 (3cd set)
- The Voice of the People: Sarah Makem: The Heart Is True (2012) – Sarah Makem
- As I Roved Out (3 CD set with long booklet, Rereleased as MP3 + Document download)

In 2009, "The Banks of Red Roses" from Sarah Makem: Ulster Ballad Singer was included in Topic Records 70 year anniversary boxed set Three Score and Ten as track three of the third CD

- Note; the booklet that Sarah Makem's 3CD compilation, 'As I Roved Out' mentions "...she (Sarah Makem) herself had several long-playing records to her credit, notably Sarah Makem Sings, and Sarah Makem, Ulster Ballad Singer." While it is clear the latter refers to the 1967 (if you are going by recording year, or 1968, if you're going by release year) album of hers, I could find no evidence of the existence of the former, Sarah Makem Sings long-playing record, or any other of the "...several long playing records..."

.
