= Tom Clancy (singer) =

Irish singer and actor (1924–1990)

Thomas "Tom" Clancy
- Tom Clancy in 1956.

Background information
- Also known as: Tommy Clancy; Thomas J. Clancy
- Born: Thomas Joseph Clancy; 29 October 1924
- Origin: Carrick-on-Suir, County Tipperary, Ireland
- Died: 7 November 1990 (aged 66) Cork City, County Cork, Ireland
- Genres: Folk; traditional Irish
- Occupations: Singer; actor
- Years active: 1947–1990
- Formerly of: The Clancy Brothers

Thomas Joseph Clancy (29 October 1924 – 7 November 1990) was a member of the Irish folk group the Clancy Brothers. He had the most powerful voice of the brothers and had previously been an actor in numerous stage productions, appearing with Orson Welles in King Lear. He also performed often on television and occasionally in the movies.

== Early years ==
Tom Clancy was one of eleven children born to Johanna McGrath and Robert Joseph Clancy in Carrick-on-Suir, County Tipperary. After being apprenticed as a baker, Clancy followed his older brother Patrick "Paddy" Clancy into the Royal Air Force (RAF) in 1943 during World War II, despite both having been members of the Irish Republican Army. In the RAF, Clancy worked as a radio operator on bombing runs over Germany.

Discharged from the RAF at the war's end, Clancy toured with a British repertory company. In 1947 he and his brother Paddy emigrated to Canada. They then moved to New York where Tom met his first wife and his oldest daughter was born in 1950. They then soon moved to Cleveland, Ohio, to live with relatives. Tom worked for a while as a repertory actor at the Cleveland Playhouse, before returning temporarily to Ireland. While in Ireland, Clancy worked for the Shakespeareana Internationale company run by English actor and manager Geoffrey Kendal. After Paddy sent him extra money, Tom Clancy returned to the United States. The brothers planned to move to California, but their car broke down. They decided to try New York City instead and found work as actors, both on and off Broadway.

== The Clancy Brothers ==
In 1956, their brother Liam Clancy joined them, accompanied by his friend Tommy Makem. Liam Clancy and Tommy Makem began singing together, and in 1959 were joined by the older Clancy brothers as The Clancy Brothers and Tommy Makem. The group performed together until Liam left in 1976. Makem had left in 1969 to be replaced for a brief time by Bobby Clancy and later Louis Killen.

Tom Clancy continued singing with The Clancy Brothers until 1976, when the group was disbanded. The group reformed in 1977 with a new line-up. Clancy performed with his brothers Paddy and Bobby and their nephew Robbie O'Connell until his death. He also performed with Paddy, Liam, and Tommy Makem during their reunion tour from 1984 to 1985.

Tom took the lead vocals on many of the group's songs, such as "The Rising of the Moon", "The Moonshiner", "Haul Away Joe", "Red Haired Mary", "The Barnyards of Delgaty", "Carrickfergus", "I Once Loved a Lass", and "The Bold Fenian Men", among others.

== Later acting career ==
Clancy continued to act during his singing career, appearing in the movies The Killer Elite (1975) and Swashbuckler (1976). He also appeared on episodes of Little House on the Prairie, Starsky and Hutch, and The Incredible Hulk, among others. He acted in several TV movies as well.

After an absence of fifteen years, Clancy returned to Broadway in May 1974 in Eugene O'Neill's A Moon for the Misbegotten. The Irish Times reviewed his performance of Phil Hogan: "In 'Moon' he deftly measures up to the formidable company in which he finds himself – a wily, sly rogue with a whimsical humour and a genuine concern for his daughter". The play was a hit and won three Tony Awards.

== Death ==
Clancy died from stomach cancer, which had been diagnosed with six months previously, at the age of 66 in 1990 at Mercy Hospital in Cork City, County Cork.

He was survived by his wife Joan and their three daughters, Rayleen, Blawneen and Rosie, who was only two years old (at the time of his death, it was incorrectly reported that he and wife Joan had four daughters). Before his marriage to his wife Joan, he had had two children, Eileen and Thomas, with Yvonne Marcus, in Cleveland, Ohio. He also had a daughter, Cait, with his second wife Laine, in the mid-1950s.

His last recording was made in 1988 with Robbie O'Connell, Bobby Clancy, and Paddy Clancy at St. Anselm College in Goffstown, New Hampshire. Unfortunately, the recording is marred by unevenly mixed instruments and voices. After Tom's death, Liam returned to the Clancy Brothers to fill in his place.

== Filmography ==
Year	Title	Role	Notes
1975	The Killer Elite	O'Leary	
1976	Swashbuckler	Mr. Moonbeam	
1980	The Incredible Hulk	Edgar Tucker	Episode "Deep Shock"
1981	Full Moon High	Priest	
1981	The Ghost of Flight 401 (Dutch)		
1984	The House of God	Police Commissioner	(final film role)

== Guest recordings ==
- 1956: The Countess Cathleen – Tradition LP
- 1980: Seamus Kennedy: Raise Your Weary Hearts – Gransha LP (Liner notes only, no spoken part)
