= Lou Killen =

English folk singer (1934–2013)

Louisa "Lou" Jo Killen (born Louis Killen; 10 January 1934 – 9 August 2013) was an English folk singer from Gateshead, Tyneside, who also played the English concertina.

== Career ==
Killen formed one of Britain's first folk clubs in 1958 in Newcastle upon Tyne, and became a professional folk singer in 1961. In the 1970s Killen recalled: "When I started Folk Song and Ballad in Newcastle in 1958 there weren't twenty folk clubs in the whole country, and when I left for the States (in 1966) there were maybe three hundred." Recordings of Killen singing some Tyneside songs were included on both The Iron Muse (Topic Records 12T86, 1963) and the revised version on CD (Topic Records TSCD465) issued in 1993. The accompanying book to the Topic Records 70 year anniversary boxed set Three Score and Ten has a dust jacket picture featuring Killen with Frankie Armstrong; and one of the songs featured on both albums of The Iron Muse, The Blackleg Miners is track six of the sixth CD in the set.

Killen emigrated to the United States in 1967 and worked with Pete Seeger before joining The Clancy Brothers. In 1971, the Clancy Brothers brought in the singer who had introduced the English concertina to the music mix, Lou Killen. They recorded two studio albums on the Audio Fidelity label: Save the Land and Show Me the Way. Their next, and final, album for Audio Fidelity was a live album, Live on St. Patrick's Day in 1973, recorded the previous year at the Bushnell Auditorium in Hartford, Connecticut. In the mid-1970s Killen left the Clancys.

In the 1990s, Killen worked as the volunteer coordinator at the San Francisco Maritime Museum, also singing chanties there and interpreting to the public.

A few years before Killen's death, she underwent a gender reassignment to become Louisa Jo.

Killen died in 2013, at the age of 79.

== Selected discography ==
=== Collaborations ===
- Isla Cameron and Lou Killen - The Waters of Tyne: Northumbrian Songs & Ballads (Prestige International, INT 13059, 1962)
- Louis Killen, Johnny Handle, Colin Ross - Along the Coaly Tyne: Old and New Northumbrian Songs (Topic Records, 12T189, 1968)
- Peter Bellamy with Louis Killen - Won't You Go My Way? (Argo, 1972)
- Lou & Sally Killen - Bright Shining Morning (Front Hall Records, FHR-06, 1975)
- Louis Killen, Jeff Warner, Gerret Warner, Fud Benson - Steady as She Goes: Songs and Chanties from the Days of Commercial Sail (Collector Records, 1977)
- Louis Killen, Stan Hugill and the X-Seamen's Institute - Sea Songs (Folkways Records, FTS 37311, 1979)

=== Solo recordings ===
Sources:

- Ballads and Broadsides (Topic Records, 12T126, 1965/2009)
- 50 South to 50 South (Seaport, SPT-102, 1972)
- Sea Chanteys (ESP-Disk', ESP 1085, 1973/1994). Also known as Good Ale.
- Old Songs, Old Friends (Front Hall, FH 012, 1978)
- Gallant Lads Are We: Songs of the British Industrial Revolution (Collector Records, 1932, 1980)
- The Rose in June (KnockOut!, KO-01, 1989)
- A Bonny Bunch (KnockOut!, KO-02, 1993)
- Sailors, Ships & Chanteys (KnockOut!, KO-03, 1995)
- A Seaman's Garland: Sailors, Ships & Chanteys, Vol. 2 (KnockOut!, KO-04, 1997)

=== Appearances on compilations ===
- The Iron Muse (A Panorama of Industrial Folk Music) (Topic Records, 12T86, 1963; TSCD465, 1993)
- Tommy Armstrong of Tyneside (Topic Records, 12T122, 1965/1997)

=== Lou Killen, Paddy Clancy, Tom Clancy, and Liam Clancy ===
- Show Me The Way Audio Fidelity Records (1972)
- Save the Land! Audio Fidelity Records (1972)
- Live on St. Patrick's Day Audio Fidelity Records (1973)
- The Clancy Brothers' Greatest Hits Vanguard Records (1973) – Vanguard LP/CD
  - This was reissued as 'Best of the Vanguard Years' with bonus material from the 1982 Live! album with Bobby Clancy and Robbie O'Connell.
