= Audio Fidelity Records =

American record company

- Parent company: 43 North Broadway, LLC
- Founded: 1954
- Founder: Sidney Frey
- Defunct: 1997
- Genre: Various
- Country of origin: U.S.
- Location: New York City

Audio Fidelity Records was a record company based in New York City, most active during the 1950s and 1960s. They are best known for having produced the first mass-produced American stereophonic long-playing record in November 1957 (although this was not available to the general public until March of the following year). The Audio Fidelity label was acquired by 43 North Broadway, LLC.

== History ==
Audio Fidelity, Inc. was founded in 1954. A British branch, A-F England, Ltd., was established in 1959. Sidney Frey sold the company in 1965 to Herman Gimbel (né Herman Levy; 1913–1978). Audio Fidelity Records, Inc., changed its name to Audiofidelity Enterprises, Inc., in May 1971. The last known releases under the Audio Fidelity label were circa 1984. In 1997, Audio Fidelity Records was purchased out of bankruptcy by Colliers Media Company. The Audio Fidelity label was acquired by 43 North Broadway, LLC.

== Background ==
Sidney Frey (1920–68), founder and president of Audio Fidelity, had Westrex, owner of one of the two rival stereo disk-cutting systems, cut a stereo LP disk for release before any of the major record labels, several of which had the Westrex equipment but had not yet produced a stereo disk. Side 1 was the Dukes of Dixieland; Side 2 was railroad sound effects. This demonstration disc was introduced to the public on December 13, 1957, at the Times Auditorium in New York City. 500 copies of this initial demonstration record were pressed. On December 16, 1957, Frey advertised in the trade magazine Billboard that he would send a free copy to anyone in the industry who wrote to him on company letterhead. Frey became known as "Mr. Stereo" during that era.

Stereophonic sound was not entirely new to the public. In 1952 sound engineer Emory Cook developed a "Binaural" disk that used two separate grooves and playback needles to produce stereophonic sound; the following year he had a catalog of about 25 disks available for audiophiles. Multi-channel sound was integral to the widescreen motion picture processes Cinerama (1952) and CinemaScope (1953). Stereophonic audio tapes had been commercially available to audiophiles, although expensive, since the early-1950s. After the release of the Audio Fidelity demonstration disks, the other spur to the popularity of stereo disks was the reduction in price of a stereo magnetic cartridge, for playing the disks, from $250 to $29.95 in June 1958. The first four stereo discs available to the general public were released by Audio Fidelity in March, 1958--Johnny Puleo and his Harmonica Gang Volume 1 (AFSD 5830), Railroad - Sounds of a Vanishing Era (AFSD 5843), Lionel - Lionel Hampton and his Orchestra (AFSD 5849) and Marching Along with the Dukes of Dixieland Volume 3 (AFSD 5851). By the end of March the company had four more stereo LPs available.

In the summer of 1958, Audio Fidelity recorded 13 classical LPs in London's Walthamstow Town Hall. The orchestra was the specially formed Virtuoso Symphony of London, which consisted of London orchestral players and leading instrumentalists including Anthony Pini, Frederick Riddle, Reginald Kell and Marie Goossens. Six of the LPs were conducted by Alfred Wallenstein, who concentrated on the symphonic repertoire (including Brahms's 4th Symphony, Tchaikovsky's Pathetique, and Berlioz's Symphonie Fantastique) and six by Arthur Winograd (both conductors were ex-cellists) who recorded lighter fare, such as operatic marches and popular overtures. The 13th LP (Strauss Waltzes) was conducted by Emanuel Vardi.

== Archives ==
Collector Don W. Reichle compiled a comprehensive database and collection of Audio Fidelity recordings which are now housed at the Syracuse University Library. The collection consists of:

- 1,404 different catalog numbers
- 1,176 different artists identified and cross-linked with album details.
- 5,857 different track titles identified and cross-linked with album details.
- 640 different pictures of album jackets cross-linked with album details.

== See also ==
- Albums released on Audio Fidelity Records
- Artists who have recorded for Audio Fidelity Records
