= Paddy Clancy =

Irish singer (1922–1998)

Patrick "Paddy" Clancy
- Clancy in 1956

Background information
- Born: Patrick Michael Clancy; 7 March 1922
- Origin: Carrick-on-Suir, County Tipperary, Ireland
- Died: 11 November 1998 (aged 76) Carrick-on-Suir, County Tipperary, Ireland
- Genres: Folk; traditional Irish
- Occupations: Singer; record producer; actor
- Instruments: Vocals; harmonica
- Years active: 1951–1998
- Formerly of: The Clancy Brothers

Patrick Michael Clancy (7 March 1922 – 11 November 1998), usually called Paddy Clancy or Pat Clancy, was an Irish folk singer best known as a member of the Clancy Brothers and Tommy Makem. In addition to singing and storytelling, Clancy played the harmonica with the group, which is widely credited with popularizing Irish traditional music in the United States and revitalizing it in Ireland. He also started and ran the folk music label Tradition Records, which recorded many of the key figures of the American folk music revival.

== Early years ==
Clancy was one of eleven children and the eldest of four boys born to Johanna McGrath and Robert Joseph Clancy in Carrick-on-Suir, County Tipperary. During World War II he served as a flight engineer in the Royal Air Force in India; he also reportedly had been a member of the Irish Republican Army. After his demobilization, Clancy worked as a baker in London. In 1947 he emigrated to Toronto, Canada with his brother Tom Clancy. The following year, the two brothers moved to Cleveland, Ohio to stay with relatives. Later, they attempted to move to California, but their car broke down and they relocated to the New York City area instead.

== Greenwich Village and Tradition Records ==
After moving to Greenwich Village in 1951, both Paddy and Tom Clancy devoted themselves primarily to careers in the theater. In addition to appearing in various Off-Broadway productions and television shows, they produced and starred in plays at the Cherry Lane Theatre in Greenwich Village and at a playhouse in Martha's Vineyard. Their productions included an 18-week run of Seán O'Casey's The Plough and the Stars.

After losing money on some unsuccessful plays, the brothers began singing concerts of folk songs after their evening acting jobs were over. They soon dubbed these concerts "Midnight Specials" and the "Swapping Song Fair." Paddy and Tom were often joined by other prominent folk singers of the day, including Pete Seeger, Woody Guthrie, and Jean Ritchie.

In 1956 their younger brother Liam Clancy immigrated to New York, where he teamed up with Tommy Makem, whom he had met while collecting folk songs in Ireland. The two began singing together at Gerde's Folk City, a club in Greenwich Village. Paddy and Tom Clancy sang with them on occasion, usually in informal folk 'sing-songs' in the Village. Around the same time, Paddy founded Tradition Records with folk-song collector and heiress Diane Hamilton, and in 1956 the Clancy Brothers and Tommy Makem released their first album, The Rising of the Moon, with only Paddy's harmonica as musical accompaniment.

However, the Clancys and Makem did not become a permanent singing group until 1959. In the meanwhile, Paddy Clancy signed and recorded established folk artists for Tradition Records, including Alan Lomax, Ewan MacColl, Paul Clayton, Ed McCurdy, Oscar Brand, and Jean Ritchie. Tradition also produced Odetta's first solo LP, Odetta Sings Ballads and Blues, which Bob Dylan (a friend of the Clancys) later cited as his inspiration to become a folk singer. Carolyn Hester's self-titled album with Tradition led to her first public recognition and her signing with Columbia Records.

In addition to planning what the label would record, Clancy edited many of the ensuing albums himself. While still president of Tradition Records, he went as a cameraman on an expedition to Venezuela in search of alluvial diamonds, ostensibly as part of a documentary crew.

== Clancy Brothers ==
In the late 1950s, Clancy with his brothers and Makem began to take singing more seriously as a permanent career, and soon they recorded their second album, Come Fill Your Glass with Us. This album proved to be more successful than their debut album, and they began receiving job offers as singers at important nightclubs, including the Gate of Horn in Chicago and the Blue Angel in New York City. The group garnered nationwide fame in the United States after an appearance on The Ed Sullivan Show, which led to a contract with Columbia Records in 1961.

Over the course of the 1960s, the Clancy Brothers and Tommy Makem recorded approximately two albums a year for Columbia. By 1964, Billboard Magazine reported that the group was outselling Elvis Presley in Ireland. Two of their albums, In Person at Carnegie Hall and The First Hurrah!, were also hits in the United States.

Paddy Clancy considered In Person at Carnegie Hall to be their best record.

The group performed together on stage, recordings, and television to great acclaim in the United States, Ireland, the United Kingdom, Canada, and Australia until Tommy Makem left to pursue a solo career in 1969. They continued performing first with Bobby Clancy and then with Louis Killen until Liam left in 1976 also to pursue a solo career. In 1977 after a short hiatus, the group reformed with Paddy, Tom, and Bobby Clancy and their nephew Robbie O'Connell. Liam returned in 1990 after the death of Tom Clancy.

In a 2008 documentary, The Yellow Bittern, Liam Clancy recalled Paddy as the "alpha male" of the group, who "quietly laid down the law" that his younger brothers and Makem followed "without questioning his authority." On another occasion, Liam noted about Paddy: "Being the eldest brother he was always the leader of the pack. His word was kind of gospel."

Paddy often acted as the spokesman for the Clancys, and he frequently included funny stories and jokes in his concerts. His signature song was the classic Irish drinking song, "A Jug of Punch." He was also well known for his renditions of "Mountain Dew," "Rosin the Bow," "The Foggy Dew," the humorous songs, "The Old Woman from Wexford" and "Mr. Moses Ri-Tooral-I-Ay," the Scottish song, "Johnny Lad", and several others.

== Return to Ireland and death ==
After two decades in North America, in 1968 Clancy returned to live in Carrick-on-Suir, where he had bought a dairy farm and bred exotic cattle. When not on tour or working on his farm, he spent much of his time fishing, reading, and doing crossword puzzles.

In the late 1990s, he was diagnosed with a brain tumor. The tumor was successfully removed, but he was also stricken with terminal lung cancer around the same time. He continued performing until his failing health prevented him from doing so any longer.

Patrick Clancy died at home of lung cancer on 11 November 1998 at the age of 76. He was buried, wearing his trademark white cap, in the tiny village of Faugheen, near Carrick-on-Suir. He was survived by his widow, Mary Clancy (née Flannery), and their four children, Rory, Orla, Maura, and Conor. He was also survived by a daughter from his first marriage, Leish Clancy, and four siblings, Liam, Bobby, Peg, and Joan.

After his death, folklorist and broadcaster Ciarán Mac Mathúna identified him as the "strong man" of the Clancy Brothers, while Irish folk musician Mick Moloney asserted that he had been "a powerful figure in a group of strong willed men...Paddy's leadership quality always shone out when the Clancys performed." Moloney also noted what he saw as Clancy's legacy: "Irish music would not enjoy the success it has today if he had not made Irish music his career and paved the way for all of us."

== Solo singing discography/Guest appearances ==
- 1959 – Folk Festival at Newport, Volume 1 – Vanguard LP
- 1961 – Folk Music of the Newport Folk Festival: 1959-1960, Volume 1 – Folkways LP/CD
- 1984 – Mick Moloney: Uncommon Bonds – Green Linnet LP/CD
- Other recordings listed under The Clancy Brothers

== Albums edited ==
=== Tradition Records ===
- 1956 – Siobhán McKenna, John Neville, Tom Clancy: The Countess Cathleen
- 1956 – Ed McCurdy: A Ballad Singer's Choice
- 1956 – Norman Notley & David Brynley: Elizabethan Songs
- 1957 – Glenn Yarbrough: Come and Sit by My Side
- 1957 – John Jacob Niles: I Wonder as I Wander — Love Songs and Carols
- 1957 – Mary O'Hara: Songs of Ireland
- 1957 – Odetta: At the Gate of Horn
- 1957 – A. L. Lloyd and Ewan MacColl: Blow Boys Blow – Songs of the Sea
- 1960 – Peg & Bobby Clancy and the Clancy Grandchildren: So Early in the Morning
- 1960 – John Jacob Niles: An Evening with John Jacob-Niles
- 1960 – Theodore Alevizos: Songs of Greece
- 1961 – The Clancy Brothers and Tommy Makem: The Clancy Brothers and Tommy Makem
- 1961 – Carolyn Hester: Carolyn Hester
- 1961 – Tommy Makem: Songs of Tommy Makem
- 1961 – Peg & Bobby Clancy: Songs from Ireland
