= Tommy Makem =

Irish folk musician (1932–2007)

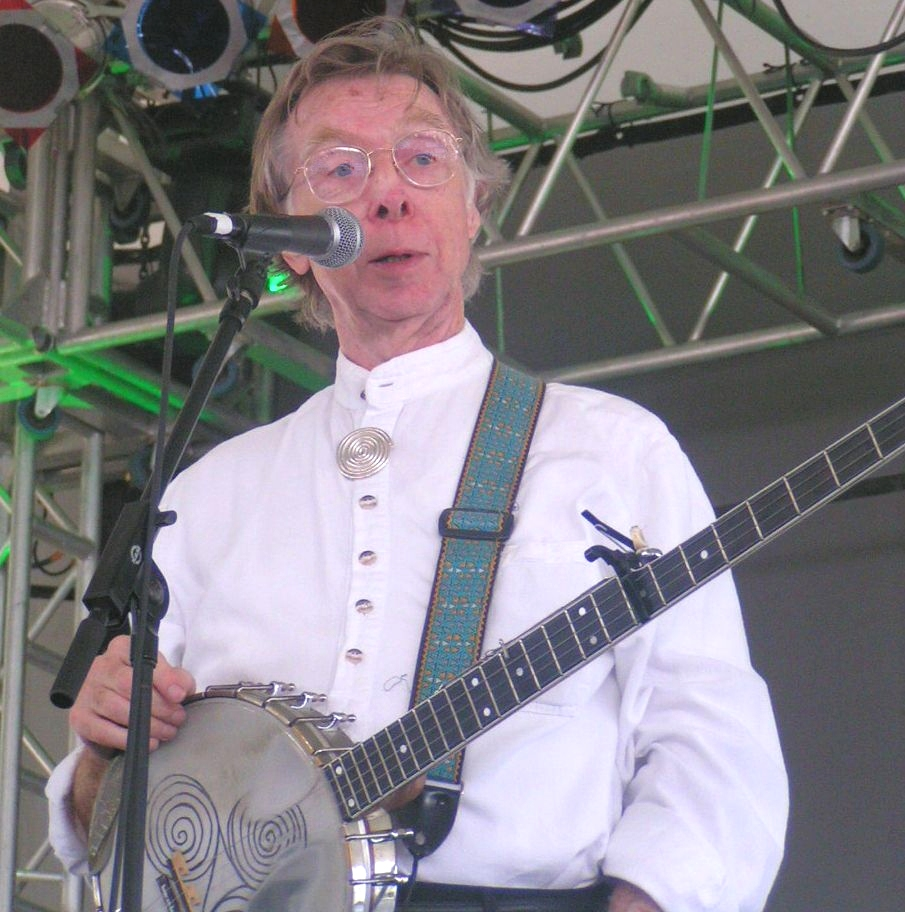
- Makem at the Dublin Irish Festival, 2005

Background information
- Born: Thomas Makem; 4 November 1932; Keady, County Armagh, Northern Ireland
- Died: 1 August 2007 (aged 74) Dover, New Hampshire, United States
- Genres: Folk; traditional Irish
- Occupations: Musician; songwriter; artist; poet
- Instruments: Vocals; banjo; tin whistle; guitar; bagpipes; bodhrán
- Years active: 1956–2007
- Formerly of: The Clancy Brothers; Makem and Clancy; The Makem Brothers; Barley Bree; Sarah Makem
- Website: makem.com

Thomas Makem (4 November 1932 – 1 August 2007) was an Irish folk musician, artist, poet and storyteller. He was best known as a member of the Clancy Brothers and Tommy Makem. He played the long-necked 5-string banjo, tin whistle, low whistle, guitar, bodhrán and bagpipes, and sang in a distinctive baritone. He was sometimes known as "The Bard of Armagh" (taken from a traditional song of the same name) and "The Godfather of Irish Music".

== Biography ==
Makem was born and raised in Keady, County Armagh (the "Hub of the Universe" as Makem always said), in Northern Ireland. His mother Sarah Makem, an important source of traditional Irish music, was visited and recorded by among others Diane Guggenheim Hamilton, Jean Ritchie, Peter Kennedy and Sean O'Boyle. His father Peter Makem was a fiddler who also played the bass drum in a local pipe band named "Oliver Plunkett" after a Roman Catholic martyr of the reign of Charles II of England. His brother and sister were folk musicians also. From the age of 8, Makem was a member of the St. Patrick's church choir for 15 years where he sang Gregorian chant and motets. He did not learn to read music but he made it in his "own way".

Makem started to work at 14 as a clerk in a garage and later he worked for a while as a barman at Mone's Bar, a local pub, and as a local correspondent for The Armagh Observer.

He emigrated to the United States in 1955, carrying his few possessions and a set of bagpipes from his time in a pipe band. Arriving in Dover, New Hampshire, Makem worked at Kidder Press, where in 1956 his hand was accidentally crushed by a press. With his arm in a sling, he left Dover for New York to pursue an acting career.

The Clancys and Makem were signed to Columbia Records in 1961. The same year, at the Newport Folk Festival, Makem and Joan Baez were named the most promising newcomers on the American folk scene. During the 1960s, the Clancy Brothers and Tommy Makem performed sold out concerts at such venues as Carnegie Hall and made television appearances on shows like The Ed Sullivan Show and The Tonight Show. The group performed for President John F. Kennedy. They also played in smaller venues such as the Gate of Horn in Chicago. They appeared jointly in the UK Albums Chart in April 1966 when Isn't It Grand Boys reached number 22.

Makem left the group in 1969 to pursue a solo career. In 1975, he and Liam Clancy were both booked to play a folk festival in Cleveland, Ohio and were persuaded to do a set together. Thereafter they often performed as Makem and Clancy, recording several albums together. Makem once again went solo in 1988. Throughout the 1970s and 1980s, he performed both solo and with Liam Clancy on The Irish Rovers' various television shows, which were filming in Canada and Ireland. In 1974 he co-hosted the Tommy Makem and Ryan's Fancy show that was filmed in St. John's, Newfoundland and broadcast on CBC.

In the 1980s and 1990s, Makem was a principal in a well-known Irish music venue in New York, "Tommy Makem's Irish Pavilion". This East 57th Street club was a prominent performance spot for a wide range of musicians. Among the performers and visitors were Paddy Reilly, Joe Burke, and Ronnie Gilbert. Makem was a regular performer, sometimes as a soloist and sometimes as part of Makem and Clancy, particularly in the late fall and holiday season. The club was also used for warm-up performances in the weeks before the 1984 reunion concert of The Clancy Brothers and Tommy Makem at Lincoln Center. In addition, the after-party for Bob Dylan's legendary 30th Anniversary Concert Celebration at Madison Square Garden in 1992 was held at the Irish Pavilion.

In 1997 he wrote a book, Tommy Makem's Secret Ireland and in 1999 premiered a one-man theatre show, Invasions and Legacies, in New York. His career included various other acting, video, composition, and writing credits. He also established the Tommy Makem International Festival of Song in South Armagh in 2000.

== Personal life and death ==
Makem was married to Mary Shanahan, a native of Chicago, for 37 years, and had four children – daughter Katie Makem-Boucher, and sons Shane, Conor and Rory. They also had two grandchildren, Molly Dewar née Makem and Robert Boucher. Mary died in 2001. The Makems initially moved from New York to Ireland early in their marriage, but returned to the United States to escape the Troubles, settling permanently in Dover, New Hampshire in 1972. Makem became an American citizen in 1986.

Makem's three sons (who performed as "The Makem Brothers") and nephews Tom and Jimmy Sweeney continue the family folk music tradition.

Makem died in Dover on 1 August 2007, after suffering from lung cancer for some time, and was buried next to his wife at Saint Mary's New Cemetery. He continued to record and perform until close to the end. Paying tribute to him after his death, Liam Clancy said, "He was my brother in every way."

== Compositions ==
Makem was a prolific composer/songwriter. His performances were always full of his compositions, many of which became standards in the repertoire. Some, notably "Four Green Fields", became so well known that they were sometimes described as anonymous folk songs. During the fall of the Iron Curtain, Makem often proudly told the story that his song "The Winds Are Singing Freedom" had become a sort of folk anthem among Eastern Europeans seeing a new future opening before them.

Makem's best-known songs include "Four Green Fields", "Gentle Annie", "The Rambles of Spring", "The Winds Are Singing Freedom", "The Town of Ballybay", "Winds of the Morning", "Mary Mack", and "Farewell to Carlingford". Even though many people mistakenly believe that Makem wrote "Red is the Rose", it is a traditional Irish folk song.

== Performance notes ==
Makem had a forceful and charismatic stage presence – the result of years of public performance, a strong personality and a bard's voice. Performances frequently included the following elements:

- Original Makem compositions; the first set often began with "The Rambles of Spring"
- The standard repertoire of folk and Irish music, both well-known and little-known (but never "Danny Boy", "When Irish Eyes are Smiling", "Toorah Loorah Looral", or other standards forbidden from requesting)
- Oddball songs, such as "Bridie Murphy and the Kamikaze Pilot" (Colm Gallagher) or "William Bloat" (Raymond Calvert)
- Poetic recitations, often as introductions to songs; a frequent source was William Butler Yeats. (Thus "Gentle Annie" usually began with "When You Are Old and Grey", and Four Green Fields usually began with Seamus Heaney's "Requiem for the Croppies".)
- Jokes, often silly, made funnier through repetition:

"If your nose is running and your feet smell, you're upside down."

- Rarely: monologues, such as Marriott Edgar's "The Lion and Albert"
- Exhortations, nearly always successful, for the audience to join in the singing

== Awards and honours ==
He received many awards and honours, including three honorary doctorates: one from the University of New Hampshire in 1998, one from the University of Limerick in 2001, and one from the University of Ulster in 2007; as well as the World Folk Music Association's Lifetime Achievement Award in 1999. With the Clancy Brothers he was listed among the top 100 Irish-Americans of the 20th century in 1999.

A bridge over the Cochecho River on Washington Street in Makem's long-time home of Dover, New Hampshire, was named the Tommy and Mary Makem Memorial Bridge in 2010.

In 2015 a new Tommy Makem Arts Centre was opened in his home town of Keady.

== Discography ==
Makem made dozens of recordings.

Specific examples follow (solo recordings only).

- Songs of Tommy Makem (1961) – Tradition (also on CD)
- Tommy Makem Sings Tommy Makem (1968) – Columbia
- In the Dark Green Wood (1969) – Columbia
- The Bard of Armagh (1970) – GWP
- Love Is Lord of All (1971) – GWP
- Listen...for the rafters are ringing (1972) – Bard (US) / Columbia (overseas)
- Recorded Live – A Room Full of Song (1973) – Bard/Columbia (as above)
- In the Dark Green Woods (1974) – Polydor (Ireland Only)
- Ever the Winds (1975) – Polydor (Ireland Only)
- 4 Green Fields (1975) – HAWK (A compilation of songs from The bard of Armagh, Love is lord of all, and Winds are singing freedom, mentioned below)
- Lord of the Dance (exclusive live version) / Winds are Singing Freedom – Bard

Following releases all available on Shanachie CD unless noted otherwise

- Lonesome Waters (1985)
- Rolling Home (1989)
- Songbag (1990) – reissued on 'Red Biddy'
- Live at the Irish Pavilion (1993)
- Tommy Makem's Christmas (1995)
- Ancient Pulsing Poetry With Music (1996) – Red Biddy
- The Song Tradition (1998)

Guest recordings

- The Lark in the Morning by Liam Clancy, Tommy Makem, Family and Friends (1955) – Tradition (also on CD)
- Folk Festival at Newport, Volume 1 (1959) – Vanguard
- The Newport Folk Festival, Volume 1 (1960) – Vanguard
- Songs for a Better Tomorrow (1963) – UAW
- Songs of the Working People (1988) – Flying Fish
- The Makem Brothers – On the Rocks (1995) – Red Biddy
- Where Have All The Flowers Gone?: The Songs of Pete Seeger (1998) – Appleseed
- Schooner Fare – A 20th Anniversary Party (1999) – Outer Green
- Barra MacNeils – The Christmas Album (1999) – label unknown
- Cherish the Ladies – The Girls Won't Leave the Boys Alone (2000) – Windham Hill
- Roger McGuinn – Treasures from the Folk Den (2001) – Appleseed
- 25th Annual Sea Music Festival (2004) – Independent release
- Barra MacNeils – The Christmas Album II (2006) – unknown label
- Various - Ar Stáitse (Volume 1 of 2) (Recorded 1973, released 2011) - RTÉ

Posthumous releases

- Legendary Tommy Makem Collection (2007) – Emerald

== Videos ==
- The Story of the Clancy Brothers and Tommy Makem (1984) – Shanachie
- Reunion Concert: Belfast (1984) – Shanachie
- Pete Seeger's Rainbow Quest (1965) (circa 1985) – Central Sun / reissued on Shanachie
- Tommy Makem and Friends in Concert (1992) – WMHT/PBS
- Bob Dylan: The 30th Anniversary Concert Celebration (1993) – Sony
- Tommy Makem in Concert With Pete Seeger and the Egan-Ivers Band (1994) – WMHT/PBS
- Tommy Makem in Concert With Odetta and The Barra MacNeils (1994) – WMHT/PBS
- Tommy Makem's Ireland (1994) – WMHT/PBS
- A Christmas Tradition (1995) – WMHT/PBS
- The Road Taken With Tommy Makem (2001) – WMHT/PBS
- The Makem and Spain Brothers In Concert (2006) – WMHT/PBS
- The Best of 'Hootenanny' (2007) – Shout! (Clancy Brothers featured in 3 performances)
- Come West Along the Road (2007) – RTÉ (completion video, featured in one performance)

== Film ==
- A Time to Remember (1988) - Christmas Film Debut as Father Halloran, with Donald O'Connor, Morgana King, and child singer Ruben Gomez.
