= Chance of a Start =

Studio album by Patrick Clifford
- Released: 1 October 2012
- Recorded: January 2011 – August 2012, New Jersey USA
- Genres: World, Irish, Celtic, folk, Irish folk
- Length: 46:40
- Label: The Irish Side
- Producer: Patrick Clifford

Patrick Clifford chronology
American Wake (2010)	Chance of a Start (2012)

Chance of a Start is the second studio album by American Irish folk musician Patrick Clifford, released in 2012. It was named by the Irish Voice newspaper as one of the eight best Irish music albums of 2012.

As on American Wake, the album uses instrumentation typical of the American folk music idiom (such as harmonica, piano, bass, and organ), to arrange six notable twentieth-century Irish folk standards and four original songs. Clifford described the resulting sound as "Irish at its heart with an American manifestation."

Unlike American Wake, Chance of a Start contains no instrumental tracks.

David Yeates and Martin Kelleher provide backing vocals on numerous tracks, the first published recordings of Four to the Bar members' collaboration since the band's 1995 release, Another Son.

== Songs ==
The album includes one song by Pete St John: "The Ferryman".

Two songs by Ewan MacColl, "Freeborn Man of the Traveling People" and "The Shoals of Herring", are given modern arrangements, featuring piano and synthesizer as well as more typical instruments such as guitar and fiddle.

Dominic Behan's "The Auld Triangle" appears as a lament, complemented by an ostinato on the violin and a men's chorus.

The traditional waltz "The Galtee Mountain Boy" is reworked as a folk ballad, and the traditional ballad "The Parting Glass" is given a dark setting, with polyrhythm.

An original song, "The Morning Sun", has been characterized as a "sunny acoustic alt-country arrangement hid[ing a] down-on-his-luck character."

The three remaining tracks-- "Pole to Pole", "Don't Look Now", and "Travel" are also original compositions.

== Track listing ==
1. "The Ferryman" (Pete St. John) – 03:19
2. "Pole to Pole" (Clifford) – 03:40
3. "The Morning Sun" (Clifford) – 05:05
4. "Freeborn Man of the Traveling People" (Ewan MacColl) – 04:31
5. "The Auld Triangle" (Dominic Behan) – 04:32
6. "The Shoals of Herring" (Ewan MacColl) – 05:36
7. "The Galtee Mountain Boy" (Trad.; arr. Clifford) – 05:05
8. "Don't Look Now" (Clifford) – 04:26
9. "Travel" (Clifford) – 05:07
10. "The Parting Glass" (Trad.; arr. Clifford) – 05:19

== Personnel ==
- Randy Decker: Drums/Percussion, backing vocals
- Marty Guilfoyle: Accordion
- Wolf Hul: Fiddle
- Ed Hummel: Fiddle
- Peter Kane: Fiddle
- Martin Kelleher: Backing vocals
- Judy Minot: Vocals
- Dan O'Dea: Fiddle, mandolin
- Mark Stewart: Bouzouki
- David Yeates: Backing vocals

== Reception ==
Initial critical response to Chance of a Start was positive. The music critic for the Irish Voice (New York) said that the album "showcases the talents of one of the most compelling singer/songwriters that has crossed my path in many a moon." The review compared Clifford favorably to Glen Hansard and Christy Moore, both calling him a "master of interpretation" and noting that he "does a fine job crafting stories of his own in the four tracks he penned."

Tony Lawless at tradconnect.com called the album "an accomplished piece of work" with "surprising hidden depths." The review noted "worthy reinterpretations of some familiar songs"—such as "The Parting Glass," which it called "wonderful"—and likened Clifford to Darden Smith, Dermot Hegarty, Johnny McEvoy, Poco, and Gram Parsons.

In December 2012, the Irish Voice selected Chance of a Start as one of the eight best albums of 2012, noting that it "re-imagines six classics by 20th century Irish and folk songwriters such as Pete St. John, Ewan MacColl and Dominic Behan, revitalizing them for a new generation, lest they be forgotten or (worse yet) fall into irrelevance for a lack of thoughtful stewardship."
