= Winifred Horan =

- Horan at Richmond Folk Festival in 2026

Background information
- Born
- Origin: New York City
- Genres: Classical Celtic, Irish folk
- Occupation: Musician
- Instrument: Violin/Fiddle
- Labels: Compass, Shanachie
- Website: https://www.winifred-horan.com/

Winifred Horan is an American violinist/fiddler of Irish descent. After classical training, she played with the all-female Celtic music ensemble Cherish the Ladies before becoming an original member of the Irish traditional music group Solas.

== Biography ==
Horan was born in New York City to Irish parents and studied piano (taught by her father, a carpenter and musician) and Irish fiddle playing at a young age. She attended and graduated from the New England Conservatory in Boston, Massachusetts, where she studied classical violin, and the Aspen Music Festival and School in Aspen, Colorado. She played with multiple orchestras, including the Boston Pops Orchestra, and string quartets, before joining the all-female Celtic music ensemble Cherish the Ladies in 1990. She co-founded Solas in 1994, and is on fiddle and backing vocals. On her participation in Solas and, in particular, touring with the group, Horan expressed in a 2008 interview: "Traveling the world with Solas has been one of the best things about being in the band."

Outside of her work with Solas, Horan was a member of and toured with The Sharon Shannon Band, and also performed with Irish singer-songwriter Pierce Turner. She was "featured fiddler" on When Juniper Sleeps, a 1996 solo album by Séamus Egan, and co-writer of certain tracks for the 1995 film The Brothers McMullen. She is also a nine-time champion Irish stepdancer and an All-Ireland fiddle champion, having won an All-Ireland Junior Championship at age eleven. In a December 2001 interview, Horan identified Liz Carroll, Egan, and Sharon Shannon as her top musical influences.

Horan released her first solo album, Just One Wish, in October 2002 on Shanachie Records. In 2006, she and fellow Solas member Mick McAuley, an accordionist, released Serenade on Compass Records, with covers of "After the Gold Rush" by Neil Young and "Make You Feel My Love" by Bob Dylan. Siobhán Long, writing for The Irish Times, listed Serenade as fifth on her list of top five Irish traditional music albums released in 2006. Horan composed two of the album's tracks: "Little Mona Lisa" and "A Daisy in December", which was featured during the third season of the American reality television competitive dance series So You Think You Can Dance.

By 2024, Horan was performing with Reverie Road, a Celtic/Irish folk ensemble with fellow Solas co-founder John Williams, former Gaelic Storm fiddler Katie Grennan, and pianist Utsav Lal.

== Selected discography ==
=== with Cherish The Ladies ===
- 1992 – The Back Door
- 1993 – Out And About
- 1998 – One and All: The Best of Cherish the Ladies

=== with Solas ===
- 1996 — Solas
- 1997 — Sunny Spells and Scattered Showers
- 1998 — The Words That Remain
- 2000 — The Hour Before Dawn
- 2002 — The Edge of Silence
- 2003 — Another Day
- 2005 — Waiting for an Echo
- 2006 — Reunion: A Decade of Solas – CD and DVD
- 2008 — For Love and Laughter
- 2010 — The Turning Tide
- 2013 — Shamrock City

=== Solo and other selected albums ===
- 1996 — The Irish Isle: Traditional Irish Music (James Keane with Winifred, Seamus Egan, Sue Richards)
- 2002 — Just One Wish
- 2002 — Pleasures Of Home (Cracker Barrel label)
- 2006 — Serenade (with Mick McAuley)
- 2014 — Lost Girl Found
- 2019 — The Memory of Magic
- 2024 — Reverie Road (with John Williams, Katie Grennan, and Ustav Lal)
