= Craic =

Term for news, gossip, fun, entertainment, and enjoyable conversation

Craic (/kræk/) and crack are terms for news, gossip, fun, entertainment, and enjoyable conversation, particularly prominent in Ireland. It is often used with the definite article – the craic – as in the expression "What's the craic?", meaning "How are you?" or "What's happening?". The Scots and English crack was borrowed into Irish as craic in the mid-20th century and the Irish spelling was then reborrowed into English. Under both spellings, the term has become popular and significant in Ireland.

== History ==
The word crack is derived from the Middle English crak, meaning "loud conversation, bragging talk". A sense of crack found in Northern England and Scotland meaning "conversation" or "news" produces expressions such as "What's the crack?", meaning "how are you?" or "have you any news?", similar to "what's up?", "how's it going?", or "what's the word?" in other regions. The context involving "news" and "gossip" originated in Northern English and Scots. A book on the speech of Northern England published in 1825 equates crack with "chat, conversation, news". The term is recorded in Scotland with this sense as far back as the 16th century, with both Robert Fergusson and Robert Burns employing it in the 1770s and 1780s.

The Scottish song "The Wark o The Weavers", which dates back to the early part of the 19th century, published by David Shaw, who died in 1856, has the opening line "We're a' met thegither here tae sit an tae crack, Wi oor glesses in oor hands...." A collection of folk songs from Cumberland published in 1865 refers to villagers "enjoying their crack". "Crack" is prominent in Cumbrian dialect and everyday Cumbrian usage (including the name of an online local newspaper), with the meaning "gossip". A glossary of Lancashire terms and phrases published in 1869 lists crack as meaning "chat", as does a book on the local culture of Edinburgh published in the same year. Glossaries of the dialects of Yorkshire (1878), Cheshire (1886), and Northumberland (1892) equate crack variously with "conversation", "gossip", and "talk". These senses of the term entered Hiberno-English from Scots through Ulster at some point in the mid-20th century and were then borrowed into Irish.

The Dictionary of the Scots Language records use of the term in Ulster in 1929. Other early Irish citations from the Irish Independent relate to rural Ulster: from 1950, "There was much good 'crack'... in the edition of Country Magazine which covered Northern Ireland"; or from 1955, "The Duke had been sitting on top of Kelly's gate watching the crack." At this time the word was, in Ireland, associated with Ulster dialects: in 1964 linguist John Braidwood said of the term, "perhaps one of the most seemingly native Ulster words is crack.... In fact the word is of English and Scots origin." It can frequently be found in the work of 20th century Ulster writers such as Flann O'Brien (1966) "You say you'd like a joke or two for a bit of crack." and Brian Friel (1980): "You never saw such crack in your life, boys".

Crack was borrowed into the Irish language with the Gaelicized spelling craic. It has been used in Irish since at least 1968, and was popularised in the catchphrase Beidh ceol, caint agus craic againn ("We'll have music, chat and craic"), used by Seán Bán Breathnach for his Irish-language chatshow SBB ina Shuí, broadcast on RTÉ from 1976 to 1982. The Irish spelling was soon reborrowed into English, and is attested in publications from the 1970s and 1980s. Craic has also been used in Scottish Gaelic since at least the early 1990s, though it is unknown if it was borrowed directly from Irish or from English.

At first the craic form was uncommon outside Irish, even in an Irish context. Barney Rush's 1960s song "The Crack Was Ninety in the Isle of Man" does not use the Irish-language spelling, neither is it used in Christy Moore's 1978 version. However, The Dubliners' 2006 version adopts the Irish spelling. The title of Four to the Bar's 1994 concert album, Craic on the Road, uses the Irish-language spelling as an English-language pun, as does Irish comedian Dara Ó Briain's 2012 show Craic Dealer.

Now, "craic" is interpreted as a specifically and quintessentially Irish form of fun. The adoption of the Gaelic spelling has reinforced the sense that this is an independent word (homophone) rather than a separate sense of the original word (polysemy). Frank McNally of The Irish Times has said of the word, "[m]ost Irish people now have no idea it's foreign."

== Criticism of spelling ==
The craic spelling has attracted criticism when used in English. Irish English language specialist Diarmaid Ó Muirithe wrote in his Irish Times column "The Words We Use" that "the constant Gaelicisation of the good old English-Scottish dialect word crack as craic sets my teeth on edge". Writing for the Irish Independent, Irish journalist Kevin Myers criticised the craic spelling as "pseudo-Gaelic" and a "bogus neologism". Other linguists have referred to the craic form as "fake Irish".

== Sociology ==
"The craic" has become a part of Irish culture. In a 2001 review of the modern Irish information economy, information sciences professor Eileen M. Trauth called "craic" an intrinsic part of the culture of sociability that distinguished the Irish workplace from those of other countries. Trauth wrote that even as Ireland transitioned away from an economy and society dominated by agriculture, the traditional importance of atmosphere and the art of conversation – "craic" – remains, and that the social life is a fundamental part of workers' judgment of quality of life.

Critics have accused the Irish tourism industry and the promoters of Irish theme pubs of marketing "commodified craic" as a kind of stereotypical Irishness. In his Companion to Irish Traditional Music, Fintan Vallely suggests that use of craic in English is largely an exercise on the part of Irish pubs to make money through the commercialisation of traditional Irish music. Likewise, Donald Clarke in The Irish Times associates the change of spelling to craic with the rebranding of the Irish pub as a tourist attraction during the 1990s.

== See also ==
- Language contact
- List of English words of Irish origin and Irish words used in English
