= Vincent Broderick (musician) =

Irish flute player

Vincent Broderick (1920 – 7 August 2008) was an Irish flute and tin whistle player and teacher and composer of Irish music.

He was born in the townland of Carramore, Bullaun, near Loughrea in County Galway.

He left Galway for Dublin in the early 1950s, where he became an enthusiastic member of the Pipers Club. In 1953 he won the All-Ireland flute competition performing one of his own compositions, and playing a copper-pipe flute that he had made himself. He was an exponent of the East Galway flute style.

In 1992 The Turoe Stone, a book containing 32 of his compositions, was published. A second volume was issued some years later. Many of his compositions became part of the repertoire of musicians playing Irish music worldwide and were recorded by dozens of artists and bands.

In 2003 he was awarded the TG4 Composer of the Year Award.

He died in Dublin in 2008.

== Select compositions ==
- "The Tinker's Daughter", also known as "Broderick's" (reel) (recorded by the James Last Orchestra on In Ireland (1986) and by many others)
- "The Milky Way" (reel) (recorded by Dervish on The Thrush in the Storm)
- "The Crock of Gold" (reel) (recorded by Eileen Ivers on Eileen Ivers and by many others)
- "The Mountain Stream" (barndance) (recorded by Kathryn Tickell on Instrumental) (2007)
- "The New Broom" (recorded by Cherish the Ladies on New Day Dawning) (1996)).
- "Around the Fairy Fort" (barndance) (recorded by Shaskeen on Walking Up Town and by many others)
- "Down the Rushy Glen" (polka) (recorded by Callanish on An Dara)
- "The Ring Around the Moon" (reel) (recorded by MacDara Ó Raghallaigh on Ego Trip)
- "The Turoe Stone" (jig) (recorded by Brian Holleran And Brian Bigley)
- "Whistler at the Wake" (jig) (recorded by Marcas Ó Murchú on Turas Ceoil and by many others)
- "The Flagstone of Memories" (reel) (recorded by John Redmond and by many others)
- "The Haunted House" and "The Banshees Wail" (Jigs) (Recorded by Catherine McEvoy on "Music in the Sligo Roscommon Style" (CIC 1996)
- "The Rookery" (Reel) (Recorded by Catherine McEvoy on "The Home Ruler" CIC 2007)
