= Four to the Bar (EP) =

EP by Four to the Bar
- Released: March 1993
- Recorded: January 1993
- Genre: Celtic, folk
- Label: Independent
- Producer: Henry Gorman

Four to the Bar chronology
| Four to the Bar (1993) | 'Craic on the Road' (1994) |

Four to the Bar was the first commercial release by the band of that name. A four-cut EP, it was released on cassette in 1993.

== Track listing ==
1. St. Brendan's Voyage (Moore)
2. Raglan Road (Traditional/Kavanagh)
3. Mr. Maguire (Traditional)
4. Amadeus Killeen/Passing Time (O'Neill)

== Personnel ==
- David Yeates: Vocals, whistle, bodhrán
- Martin Kelleher: Vocals, guitar, mandolin, bouzouki
- Patrick Clifford: Bass, backing vocals
- Keith O'Neill: Fiddle, tenor banjo

== Production ==
- All arrangements by Four to the Bar
- Recorded in New York City, Winter 1993
- Produced by Henry Gorman
- Photograph by James Higgins

== Trivia ==
- "Mr. Maguire" also appears on 1994's Craic on the Road.
- A later version of "Passing Time" appears as "Passing My Time" on 1995's Another Son.
- The "Killeen" in "Amadeus Killeen" is a tribute to a friend of composer Keith O'Neill.
- Martin Kelleher's first instrument was the mandolin. These tracks are the only known recordings of him playing the instrument.
- Producer Henry Gorman was a founding member of Big Stupid Guitars.
- The cover shot was taken by James Higgins, a staff photographer for the Irish Voice newspaper.
