= Mursheen Durkin =

Irish folk song about an Irish migrant to America

The Irish folk song "Muirsheen Durkin" tells the story of an emigrant from Ireland who goes to mine for gold in California during the California Gold Rush, 1849. The song is about emigration, although atypically optimistic for the genre. The name "Muirsheen" is a good phonetic approximation to the pronunciation of "Máirtín" (Martin) in Connacht Irish; it could alternatively be construed as a diminutive of "Muiris" (Maurice). A pratie is a potato, the historical staple crop of Ireland. "America" is pronounced "Americay", as was common among Gaelic peoples around Ireland.

The air to which it is sung is Cailíní deasa Mhuigheo (Pretty Girls of Mayo), which is a popular reel dating from the nineteenth century.

The song was first published by Colm Ó Lochlainn in his book More Irish Street Ballads in 1965. Ó Lochlainn had learned the song as a child but could only remember one verse. He wrote two more verses himself (or as he put it, "invented" them) and published the song with three verses, the ones he wrote as the first and second verses, with the traditional verse he remembered as the third verse.

The song became popular after it was recorded by Johnny McEvoy. McEvoy treated the traditional verse as a chorus, repeating it after each of the other verses. He also included a new third verse starting "Goodbye to all the boys at home".

It is in this form that the song became popular and is usually sung, sometimes with minor word changes.

== Performers ==
The song reached prominence when Johnny McEvoy's recording reached no. 1 in Ireland in 1966.

It has been covered by the following artists (and others):

- Christy Moore
- Sharon Shannon
- Four to the Bar on their live album Craic on the Road.
- The Pogues
- The Irish Rovers (both as "Muirsheen Durkin" and as "Goodbye Mrs. Durkin")
- Johnny McEvoy
- The Dubliners on their album More of the Hard Stuff
- The Poxy Boggards on their album Whiskey Business
- Golden Bough on their album Songs of the Irish Immigrants
- The Mollys on their album Hat Trick
- Off Kilter on their album Celtic Armadillo
- Darby O'Gill
- The Wolfe Tones on their album Up the Rebels
- 1916 on their album Last Call for Heroes
- Na Fianna on their album The Stable Sessions
- Fiddler's Green on their album The Green Machine

== Variations ==
"Molly Durkin" is a derivation made popular by Murty Rabbett in the 1940s in the United States. The song has a lively tempo and tells a whimsical tale of a man who decides to give up his work as a mortar shoveller in order to take up mining gold. The song is not so much a song of leaving Ireland as it is an Irishman's response to a woman's scorn.

Recordings:

- Murty Rabbett & His Gaelic Band: "Farewell To Ireland" Properbox 3(P1109-12) (1999/2005)
- Ballinasloe Fair-Early Recordings Of Irish Music In America Traditional Crossroads CD 4284, CD (1998/2005)
