= At Home (Cherish the Ladies album) =

Studio album by Cherish the Ladies
- Released: June 29, 1999
- Recorded: December 1998–January 1999
- Genre: Celtic
- Length: 57:28
- Label: RCA
- Producer: Brian Keane

Cherish the Ladies chronology
| Threads of Time (1998) | At Home (1999) | The Girls Won't Leave the Boys Alone (2001) |

Professional ratings
Review scores
| Source | Rating |
|---|---|
| Allmusic | 4/5 stars |

At Home is an album by Irish-American folk group Cherish the Ladies that was released in 1999 on the RCA label. It contains a combination of traditional Irish folk songs, such as the Irish language "Is Fada Liom Uaimí Uaimí," and purely instrumental numbers, including jigs, reels, and airs. Bobby and Liam Clancy of The Clancy Brothers made guest appearances on the album. One of the members of Cherish the Ladies, Aoife Clancy, was the daughter of Bobby and the niece of Liam. Her brother, Finbarr Clancy, sings with them on "John o' Dreams," while her cousin Dónal Clancy accompanies them on guitar. This was the second-to-last album on which any of the Clancy Brothers appeared together.

== Track listing ==
1. "The Limerick Lassies Set: Limerick Lassies/The Bird Feeder/The Bank of Ireland/Grampa's Ceili Band" – 4:58
2. "Matt Hyland" – 5:35
3. "The Tapas Reel Set: Harvest Moon/Eddy Moloney's Reel/Martin With the Long Ears/The Tapas Reel" – 5:00
4. "The Curragh of Kildare" (Traditional) – 4:06
5. "The Harbor Jig Set: The Harbor Jig/The Falcon on the Hedge/Jack's Morning Feast" – 4:00
6. "The Waves of Kilkee" – 4:35
7. "The Leader of the Band" – 4:08
8. "Father's Day Medley: The Quilty/Larry Redican's/Drag Her 'Round the Road/The Lads from Leitrim/The Bag of Spuds" – 7:16
9. "John of Dreams" – 5:43 [with Bobby, Liam, and Finbarr Clancy]
10. "The Nightbird/Mystery's Dance" – 3:29
11. "Is Fada Liom Uaimí Uaimí (I Long for Her)" – 3:03
12. "Medley: Gaelic Air/B Minor Reel/The Galtee Rangers/Sheehan's Reel" – 5:35

== Credits ==
In alphabetical order:

- Aoife Clancy: vocals
- Mary Coogan: banjo, guitar, and mandolin
- Siobhan Egan: fiddle and bodhran
- Donna Long: piano, synthesizer, fiddle, and harmony vocals
- Joanie Madden: flute, tin whistle, and harmony vocals
- Mary Rafferty: accordion, concertina, and tin whistle
