= Mick Maguire =

Traditional Irish folk song about courtship

"Mick McGuire" is a traditional Irish folk song about courtship. It tells the story of a young man who courts a woman named Kate or Katie. He is initially well received by her mother because he owns a farm, and he is given a seat of honor in the house. He loses favor with Kate's mother after their wedding due to his drinking and his wasteful spending of her inheritance, and therefore he loses his comfortable spot at their fire.

== Recordings ==
- The Clancy Brothers on their 1959 album Come Fill Your Glass with Us.
- Robin Hall and Jimmie Macgregor on their 1962 album Tonight and Every Night.
- The Irish Rovers on their 1966 debut album The First of the Irish Rovers.
- Four to the Bar on their 1994 live album Craic on the Road.
- Orthodox Celts on their 1997 album The Celts Strike Again.

== Arrangements ==
"Mick McGuire" was arranged for TTBB choir by Eric M. Pazdziora and published by Alliance Music Publications.

== Melody ==
The melody used is very popular and is also used for "The Hot Asphalt" as sung by The Dubliners, and a song by the High Kings called "Irish Pub". Matt McGinn used the melody for 'The Big Glasgow Polis' from his album The Two Heided Man, in 1972.
