= On Christmas Night =

Studio album (Christmas) by Cherish the Ladies
- Released: November 16, 2004
- Studio: Cottage House Studios, Yonkers, New York
- Genre: Celtic
- Length: 50:54
- Label: Rounder
- Producer: Joanie Madden

Cherish the Ladies chronology
| Across the Waves (2004) | On Christmas Night (2004) | Woman of the House (2005) |

Professional ratings
Review scores
| Source | Rating |
|---|---|
| Allmusic | 3.5/5 stars |

On Christmas Night is an album by Cherish the Ladies, released in 2004 on the Rounder Records label.

== Track listing ==
1. "On Christmas Night/Charles O'Conor" – 3:28
2. "The Castle of Dromore" – 4:05
3. "Henry Roe McDermott/The Holly and the Berry" – 4:21
4. "Hark! The Herald Angels Sing/The Traveler/Lilies in the Field/The Blacksmith's Reel" – 6:22
5. "The Distressed Soldier/Angels We Have Heard on High/The Fairy Reel" – 6:54
6. "The Little Drummer Boy" – 3:57
7. "O Holy Night/Cill Chais" – 6:23
8. "Ding Dong Merrily on High/The Cordal Jig/Old Apples in Winter/Con Cassidys" – 4:43
9. "Silent Night" – 5:45
10. "Oh Little Town of Bethlehem/The Ballintore Fancy/The Kerry Reel/Limestone Rock" – 4:56
