= Threads of Time (album) =

Studio album by Cherish the Ladies
- Released: February 24, 1998
- Recorded: December 6–15, 1997
- Genre: Celtic
- Length: 51:44
- Label: RCA
- Producer: Brian Keane

Cherish the Ladies chronology
One and All: The Best of Cherish the Ladies	Threads of Time	At Home

Professional ratings
Review scores
Source	Rating
Allmusic	4/5 stars

Threads of Time, an album by Cherish the Ladies, was released in 1998 on the RCA label.

== Track listing ==
1. Reels & Jigs: "Rolling in the Barrel/The Pinch of Snuff/Vincent Campbell's/The Galloping Hound (by Siobhán Egan)" – 3:17
2. "High Germany" – 4:11
3. Reels: "Thady Casey's Fancy/The Ladies' Pantalettes/The Monaghan Twig/The Linen Cap (Joanie Madden)" - 3:34
4. Waltz: "Her Mantle So Green" – 4:44
5. "The Ballad of the Foxhunter" (based on poetry by W.B. Yeats) – 4:35
6. Reels: "Liza's Dream (Donna Long)/The Westside Highway (J. Madden)" – 3:30
7. Slow Polka & Slide: "The Battle of Aughrim/The Star Above the Garter" – 3:09
8. "The Lake Isle of Innisfree" (W.B. Yeats) – 3:01
9. Reels: "Tip Toe Home/Paddy Kelly's" – 4:28
10. "The Bergen (lyrics by Jez Lowe)" – 4:25
11. Polkas: "The Anascaul Polka/Pat Enright's/Joe Wilson's (J. Madden)" – 3:22
12. "The Bonny Light Horseman" – 5:31
13. Strathspey & Reels: "Miss Maule's (J. Scott Skinner)/Alta's Reel (D. Long)/The Five of Diamonds (J. Madden)/The Pilltown Reel" – 3:57
