= The Newry Highwayman =

Traditional Irish folk song

"The Newry Highwayman" (Roud 490, Laws L12, see below for alternate titles) is a traditional English-language folk song about a highwayman's life, deeds, and death. It is found in Ireland, England, the United States, and Canada, under many different names. The earliest known version is from 1788, likely printed by John Brown, in a chapbook entitled "The irish robbers's [sic] adventure. To which is added An Elegy on the Death of Captain Allen." The earliest broadside is from 1824 (Bodleian Harding B 25(2054)). Some versions mention "Mansfield" and this is sometimes taken to be William Murray, 1st Earl of Mansfield (1706-1793). The 1788 version mentions "Reddans Town" instead of Newry, though the rest of the song is nearly identical to later versions.

Other titles for this song include:

- Wild and Wicked Youth
- The Flash Lad
- In Newry Town
- Newlyn Town
- The Rambling Boy
- The Roving Blade
- Rude and Rambling Man
- Adieu Adieu
- The Irish Robber

== Recordings ==
=== British and Irish variants ===
- Tommy Makem and Liam Clancy on their 1978 album Two for the Early Dew.
- The Dubliners on their 1983 album Prodigal Sons
- Four to the Bar on their 1995 album Another Son.
- Waterson–Carthy sang it on Fishes and Fine Yellow Sand as "Newry Town"
- The Watersons sang it on For Pence and Spicy Ale as "Adieu Adieu"
- Brass Monkey sang it on Sound and Rumour as "The Flash Lad"
- The Yetties sang it on A Load Old Bales as "Adieu Adieu"
- Eliza Carthy sang it on Red (1998) as "Adieu Adieu"
- Solas performed it on their first self-titled album and again on their 2006 album Reunion: A Decade of Solas.
- Fairport Convention on their 1977 album The Bonny Bunch of Roses as "Adieu Adieu"
- Malinky on their 2019 album Handsel
- Landless on their 2024 album Lúireach

=== American variants ===
- The Carolina Tar Heels "Rude & Rambling Man" 1929.
- The Carter Family "The Rambling Boy" 1941.
- Wade Mainer "Ramblin' Boy" 1941.
- Joan Baez "Rake And Rambling Boy" 1960.
- Boiled in Lead on their 1994 album Antler Dance.
- New Lost City Ramblers "Rambling Boy" 1963.
- Myers Family and Friends "The Rambling Boy" 2007.
- Bob Dylan has occasionally performed the song live as "Newry Highwayman" or "Roving Blade"
- Runa recorded a version of "The Newry Highwayman" on their 2011 album Stretched on Your Grave.

== External references ==
- Columbia State University
- Newry Town
