= Woman of the House =

Studio album by Cherish the Ladies
- Released: September 27, 2005
- Genre: Celtic
- Length: 52:13
- Label: Rounder
- Producer: Phil Cunningham

Cherish the Ladies chronology
On Christmas Night	Woman of the House

Professional ratings
Review scores
Source	Rating
Allmusic	4/5 stars

Woman of the House, an album by Cherish the Ladies, was released in 2005 on the Rounder Records label.

== Track listing ==
All songs traditional except as indicated.

1. Reels: "The Jolly Seven (trad.)" / "The Rascal on the Haystack" (trad.) / "Bonkers in Yonkers" (Joanie Madden) – 3:52
2. "Sweet Thames Flow Softly" (Ewan MacColl) – 5:21
3. Jigs: "Carolan's Favorite Jig" / "The Rakes of Cashel" / "Highland March in Oscar and Lucinda" – 4:55
4. "Bogie's Bonnie Belle" – 5:15
5. "Woman of the House Medley: The Fairy Queen/The Gooseberry Bush/Paddy Kelly's/Woman of the House" – 5:18
6. "The Hills of New Zealand" (Joanie Madden) – 4:43
7. "Betsy Belle and Mary Gray" – 3:44
8. "Fair and Tender Ladies" – 5:07
9. Slip Jigs: "Paddy O'Snap" / "Robin Kelegher" / "The Cove of Cork" – 3:44
10. "The Green Fields of Canada" – 6:31
11. Reels: "The Old Maids of Galway" / "The Sunny Banks" / "The Flooded Road to Glenties" / "Free & Easy" – 3:43

== Personnel ==
=== Cherish the Ladies ===
- Joanie Madden: Flute, alto flute, low & high whistles, harmony vocals
- Mary Coogan: Guitars, mandolin, banjo, banjitar, octave mandolin
- Heidi Talbot: Vocals
- Roisin Dillon: Fiddle
- Mirella Murray: Accordion

=== With Special Guests ===
- Sharon Shannon: Accordion
- Liz Kane: Fiddle
- Kate Rusby: Vocals
- Karen Matheson: Vocals
- Donna Long: Piano, harmony vocals
- Phil Cunningham: Piano, keyboards
- Laoise Kelly: Harp
- Tríona Ní Dhomhnaill: Piano
- John Joe Kelly: Bodhrán
- Phil Bowler: Upright bass, bowed bass
- James MacIntosh: Drums and percussion
- Ewan Vernal: Bass
- Donald Shaw: Wurlitzer
