= Ordinary Man (Christy Moore album) =

Studio album by Christy Moore
- Released: 1985
- Genre: Irish folk
- Label: Walker Music UK
- Producer: Dónal Lunny

Christy Moore chronology
Ride On (1984)	Ordinary Man (1985)	The Spirit of Freedom (1986)

Ordinary Man is the tenth studio album by Irish folk artist Christy Moore. It features songs like "Ordinary Man", "St. Brendan's Voyage" and "Another Song is Born". The album featured songs by Peter Hames, Johnny Mulhearn, Hugh McDonald, Colm Gallagher and Floyd Red Crow Westerman; as well as some backing vocals by Enya on "Quiet Desperation", "Sweet Music Roll On" and "The Diamondtina [sic] Drover" and some fine uilleann pipes work by Liam O'Flynn. The original release of the album featured the song "They Never Came Home" which Moore wrote for the victims and families of the Stardust fire. The song was quickly removed from the album because the lyrics were found to be libelous.

== Summary ==
Ordinary Man, as the name suggests, was an album for the working man. The songs and music reflected the economic atmosphere of Ireland and of Great Britain at the time. The title song, "Ordinary Man", was written by Grimsby musician Peter Hames and depicts a factory worker losing his job as the plant closes down, and his struggle to survive. The album also has a strong link to Moore's Irish roots with songs like "St. Brendans Voyage" and "Delirium Tremens" both relating directly to Ireland. Dónal Lunny played a major part in the album, writing much of the music for the songs. A long time friend of Moore, Lunny was also a member of Planxty and has worked closely with him for many years. The other former bandmates from Planxty who worked on the album were Andy Irvine and Liam O'Flynn. And Moving Hearts bandmate of both Moore and Lunny, Noel Eccles, lent some percussion aid to a couple of songs.

== Songs and music ==
The songs and music are linked with the economic climate of Ireland at the time, the general dissatisfaction at government and still retains close links with Irish Music. Arty McGlynn, is the guitar mastermind on most of the songs on the album but the title song was written by Peter Hames and "Delerium Tremens" was written by Moore himself—"DTs" was perhaps the most memorable song from the album. It is a satirical song, directed towards the leaders in Irish politics and culture. Some of the people mentioned in the song include:

- Charles Haughey, at the time Fianna Fáil leader
- Ruairi Quinn, at the time a Labour TD, later the party leader
- Dick Spring, at the time Labour Party leader
- Roger Casement, he was captured bringing German guns to Ireland for the 1916 Rising
- Alice Glenn, Fine Gael politician and moral crusader,

The original release of the album featured the song "They Never Came Home", which Moore wrote for the victims and families of the Stardust fire which took place on 14 February 1981, in Dublin. The song heavily criticizes the Irish government and the owners of the nightclub. At the time of the album's release an investigation into the fire had concluded that the cause was most likely arson, a finding which was heavily contested by survivors and families of the victims. However, that meant that in Ireland the song lyrics were found to be libelous and the song was quickly removed from the album.

=== "St. Brendan's Voyage" ===
"St. Brendan's Voyage" depicts the legendary journey of Saint Brendan the Navigator in an unconventional, comical, and fanciful way.

The body of the song consists of four eight-line verses, each followed by a four-line chorus. It opens, however, with a four-line expository verse which establishes the year of the narrative as 501 A.D., and suggests that Brendan's motivation for leaving was that he was "tired of thinning turnips and cutting curly kale."

The first full verse seems to establish a heroic tone, claiming that "of all the navigators, St. Brendan was the best." But it quickly turns comic, offering that Long Island was discovered, and America "put... on the map" as a result of Brendan stopping to purchase candles. He is then given credit for "finding" Honolulu, Australia, China, and Japan. Finally, the listener learns that the eponymous voyage is in fact Brendan's return to Ireland at the age of 70. His traveling companion, an albatross, is also introduced; the bird is subsequently mentioned in each chorus.

The second verse deals with his arrival in County Kerry, where he "clear[s] through customs," and visits Dingle, Ballyferriter, the Conor Pass, and finally Brandon.

The third verse portrays his homecoming celebrations, for which "the entire population came," "the fishermen hauled up their nets, [and] the farmers left their hay." However, the festivities turn sour when Brendan announces that he intends to marry-- "to seek a wife so late in life, and him a total wreck."

In the final verse, a chagrined Brendan returns to the sea—and to the albatross, who has been waiting for him on the island of Inishvickillane and greets him with "'tis great to see you, boss."

In 1993, the song was covered by Four to the Bar, on Four to the Bar (EP).

== Track listing ==
Side one

1. "Sweet Music Roll On" (Graham Lyle, Tom McGuinness)
2. "Delirium Tremens" (Christy Moore)
3. "Ordinary Man" (Peter Hames)
4. "Matty" (Johnny Mulhearn)
5. "The Reel in the Flickering Light" (Colm Gallagher)
6. "The Diamondtina (sic) Drover" (Hugh McDonald)

Side two

1. "Blantyre Explosion" (traditional, arr. Moore/Lunny/McGlynn)
2. "Hard Cases" (Johnny Mulhearn)
3. "Continental Ceili" (Johnny Mulhearn, Christy Moore)
4. "St. Brendan's Voyage" (Christy Moore)
5. "They Never Came Home" (Christy Moore) †
6. "Quiet Desperation" (Floyd Red Crow Westerman)

† later pressings replaced "They Never Came Home" with "Another Song is Born", due to a lawsuit.

== Personnel ==
- Christy Moore: lead vocals, guitars
- Dónal Lunny: guitars (1,4,6,7,8,9,12), keyboards (1,2,3,4,5,6,7,8,12), mandolins (4,8,12), bouzouki (4,8,10,11,12), vocals(911)
- Arty McGlynn: guitars (1,3,4,6,7,8,9,12), pedal steel(3)
- Enya Ní Bhraonáin: vocals (1,6,12)
- Liam Óg O'Flynn: uilleann pipes (1,7,9,12), tin whistle (12)
- Andy Irvine: mandolin (8,10), uncredited harmonica (4)?
- Noel 'Nollaig' Bridgeman: accordion (6,8,9)
- Noel Eccles: percussion (3), chimes (5)
- Tony Molloy: bass (3)
- Nicky Ryan: vocals (9)

== Production ==
- Recorded at Aigle Studio, Dublin
- Produced by Dónal Lunny
- Engineers: Philip Begley, Nicky Ryan

== Liner notes ==
"My gratitude to Dónal Lunny for the tender loving care he gave to this album and for his inspiration and encouragement in all things at all times." ~ Christy Moore, June 1985
