= Craic on the Road =

Craic on the Road: Live at Sam Maguire's

Live album by Four to the Bar
- Released: August 1994
- Recorded: June 1994
- Genre: Celtic; folk; folk rock
- Label: Independent
- Producer: Four to the Bar

Four to the Bar chronology
Four to the Bar (EP) (1993)	Craic on the Road: Live at Sam Maguire's (1994)	Another Son (1995)

Craic on the Road: Live at Sam Maguire's was the first full-length album by Four to the Bar, released in 1994.

== Track listing ==
1. I'll Tell Me Ma (Traditional)
2. Waxie's Dargle/The Rare Old Mountain Dew (Traditional)
3. My Love's in Germany (Traditional)
4. I Ain't Marching Anymore (Phil Ochs)
5. The Hills of Connemara (Traditional)
6. A Taste of the Reel World (Traditional)
7. The Black Velvet Band/The Wild Rover/The Galway Shawl (Traditional)
8. The Ferryman (Pete St. John)
9. Mick Maguire (Traditional)
10. Muirsheen Durkin (Traditional)
11. Jenny's and Out! (Traditional)

== Personnel ==
- David Yeates: Vocals, bodhrán, flute, tin whistle
- Martin Kelleher: Vocals, guitar
- Patrick Clifford: Bass
- Keith O'Neill: Fiddle
- Seamus Casey: Djembe, congas, percussion
- Tony McQuillan: Accordion

== Production ==
- Produced by Four to the Bar with Kevin Coleman
- Recorded live on June 16, 1994 at Sam Maguire's Pub, Bronx NY, by Boulevard Studios, New Milford NJ
- Crew chiefs: Mike Marri, Anthony Cioffi
- Assistant recording engineer: Gene Porfedo
- Stage engineer: Mark "Doc" Doratto
- Mixed at World Studio, New York NY
- Mastered at Steller Productions and Studio 900, New York NY
- Mixing and mastering engineer: Tim Hatfield

== Trivia ==
- One of the album's outtakes was a spontaneous version of "Who the F*** Is Alice"
- This version of "I'll Tell Me Ma" appears in iTunes' "Essential St. Patrick's Day Music" collection.
- David Yeates does an impersonization of Beavis and Butthead during "Black Velvet Band."
- "Mr. Maguire" appeared previously on the band's 1993 EP.
- The sidewalk graffiti in the cover art was done by the band; the photographer had to stand on the tour van to get the proper angle.
