= Sam Larner =

English fisherman and folk-singer

- Born: 18 October 1878; Winterton-on-Sea, Norfolk
- Died: 11 September 1965 (aged 86); Great Yarmouth, Norfolk
- Occupations: Fisherman, folk singer

Samuel James Larner (18 October 1878 – 11 September 1965) was an English fisherman and traditional singer from Winterton-on-Sea, a fishing village in Norfolk, England. His life was the basis for Ewan MacColl's song The Shoals of Herring, and his songs continue to be recorded by revival singers.

== Early life ==
Sam Larner was born in 1878 to George Ezra Larner (1846–1925) and Jane Amelia Jones Larner (née Powles) (1847–1926). He started singing from an early age, learning the songs his grandfather and others sang in the pubs at Winterton, and earning pennies by singing them to coach parties that visited the village.

Fishing was an almost inevitable occupation for one of nine children of a fisherman father growing up in a village with a population of 800 people, 300 of whom were fishermen. Larner is quoted as saying "Why, for me and my brothers that was either sea or gaol, and that for my sisters that was service or gaol." He first went to sea as a cabin boy on a lugger at the age of 13 and in 1894 signed as a deckhand on The Snowflake, another sailing boat. From 1899 he worked on steam trawlers. As a fisherman he learned the songs fellow crew members sang pulling in the nets as well as in singing sessions in pubs in fishing ports the length of Britain. He won a singing competition in Lerwick in Shetland in 1907, recalling the event years later:

And the Lerwick ladies, they had to judge, and the gentlemen to judge the singing. And I got the most encore of the whole lot for that song. They won't let me sit down. I had to sing them another song.

During the First World War, Larner was in the Royal Navy. In 1923 he married Dorcas Eastick (1878–1969) of Great Cressingham. He left fishing due to ill health in 1933, and spent some time unemployed as well as doing whatever jobs he could find, including road mending and forestry.

== Repertoire ==
Larner knew roughly 60 traditional songs, which he learnt from many people including his father and fellow fisherman such as James "Old Larpin" Sutton (from whom Ernest John Moeran collected several songs). Some were old ballads such as "Henry Martin" ("The Lofty Tall Ship"), "Barbara Allen", "The Outlandish Knight", "The Jolly Beggar" and "Clear Away the Morning Dew". Others were sea songs such as "Windy Old Weather".

I soon picked up the old songs. The ruder they were the quicker I picked 'em up.

— Sam Larner

As well as traditional songs, Larner knew sea rhymes and old pieces of fishing lore, and was a noted step dancer.

== Folk-singing career ==
In 1956 Philip Donnellan, then a radio producer for BBC Birmingham, met Larner in a pub. Donellan was looking for traditional singers to take part in radio programmes and recorded about 25 songs and speech from Larner in 1957 and 1958, using the material in two programmes, Coast and Country: The Wash (broadcast in 1957) and Down to the Sea (1959). Donellan brought him to the attention of Ewan MacColl, Peggy Seeger and Charles Parker who were engaged in producing the first of the innovatory radio ballads which used songs, sound effects and music combined with the voices of people involved in an industry or common experience. Larner took part in the third programme in the series, Singing the Fishing, about the East Coast fishing industry. MacColl's song "The Shoals of Herring", which describes a fisherman's progress from cabin boy to deckhand, largely based on Larner's life, was written for the programme. Singing the Fishing won the Prix Italia for radio documentary in October 1960.

MacColl and Seeger recorded more material from Larner and he performed in their Ballads and Blues Club in London. In 1961 Now is the Time for Fishing, an LP using some of the songs and speech they had recorded, was released by Folkways Records. In 1964 he was featured with fellow Norfolk singer Harry Cox in a TV film by Philip Donnellan, The Singer and the Song; this was released as an LP in 1966.

== Death ==
Sam Larner died on 11 September 1965 in hospital in Great Yarmouth. He left £857, close to the average annual wage at the time. He was survived by his wife, Dorcas, who died in 1969. They had no children.

== Legacy ==
Larner is considered a key figure in the folk revival of the 1950s and '60s. He endeared himself to both local audiences and important members of the folk revival with his vibrant personality as well as his songs. The folk singer Martin Carthy, who influenced Bob Dylan and Simon & Garfunkel with his music, became a musician after being inspired by Larner's singing at a concert in London in the mid-1950s.

There is a commemorative blue plaque on Larner's former home in Winterton.

'The star of East Anglian folk singing. That's how I was described. An' my old chest went proud out there. I'll tell you'. - Sam Larner

== Discography ==
Solo albums

- Now is the Time for Fishing, Folkways Records, 1961, re-released by Topic Records as a CD 1999. (Recordings made by Ewan MacColl and Peggy Seeger)
- A Garland for Sam, Topic Records, 1974 (Recordings made by Phillip Donnellan)

Radio ballad

- Singing the Fishing, Topic Records, 1960

Anthologies

- Blow the Man Down Topic Records, 1993
- My Ship Shall Sail The Ocean - Songs of Tempest & Sea Battles, Sailor Lads & Fishermen[ (The Voice of the People Vol 2) Topic Records, 1999.
- Come All My Lads That Follow the Plough - The Life of Rural Working Men & Women (The Voice of the People Vol 5) Topic Records, 1999.
- We've Received Orders to Sail - Jackie Tar at Sea & on Shore (The Voice of the People Vol 12) Topic Records, 1999.
- Good People Take Warning. Ballads Sung By British & Irish Traditional Singers (The Voice of the People Vol 23) Topic Records, 2012
