= The Ferryman (song) =

Irish folk ballad by Pete St. John

"The Ferryman", also sometimes known as "The Strawberry Beds", is an Irish folk ballad, written by Pete St. John.

Set in modern-day Dublin in Ireland, as with other works by St. John, "The Ferryman" relates to economic change in the city. The song is a monologue, by a former pilot of a ferry on the River Liffey to his wife, Molly, as he contemplates the implications of his unemployment.

Despite the unpleasant subject matter, the song ends optimistically, with the declaration "we're still living, and ... we're still young, and the river never owned me heart and soul".

== Recordings ==
The song was recorded by the Dublin City Ramblers in the early 1980s for their EP, The Ferryman, reaching number 6 in the Irish charts in December 1982. The song has also been recorded by The Dubliners, Four to the Bar, The Irish Rovers, Gaelic Storm, Patsy Watchorn, and Patrick Clifford.

== See also ==
- List of Irish ballads
- Strawberry Beds
- The Rare Ould Times
