= Freeborn Man of the Traveling People =

"Travelling People"

Single by The Johnstons
- B-side: "Going Home"
- Released: 1966
- Recorded: 1966
- Studio: Eamonn Andrews Studios
- Genre: Folk , close harmony
- Length: 2:57
- Label: Pye
- Songwriter: Ewan MacColl

"Freeborn Man of the Travelling People," also called "Travelling People" or "The Travelling People," is a folk ballad, written by Ewan MacColl for The Travelling People, which was first broadcast in 1964, one of eight BBC "Radio Ballads."

== Lyrics ==
The song celebrates the lifestyle of Gypsy, Roma and Traveller people, while at the same time warning that their traditional itinerant lifestyle is disappearing ("Winds of change are blowing, old ways are going / Your travelling days will soon be over.")

== Song history ==
The song was first performed as the theme tune for a BBC Radio series about Gypsy, Roma and Traveller people in the United Kingdom.

The Johnstons version labels "Going Home" as the A side and "The Travelling People" as the B side, but this appears to be an error as all media record the single as "The Travelling People".

It was number one on the Irish Singles Chart for a week in August 1966. In his autobiography, Christy Moore claims that the word "Traveller" was rarely used in Ireland before the song's release, with itinerants instead being called "gypsies" or "tinkers."

It has been recorded by Dick Gaughan, Liam Clancy, Christy Moore, The Johnstons, Cherish the Ladies, Bobby Clancy, Patrick Clifford, The Southern Folk Four, Schooner Fare, Hank Williams Jr, Donovan, and Luke Kelly.
