= The Shoals of Herring =

1960 ballad written by Ewan MacColl

Song by Ewan MacColl and Peggy Seeger

from the album New Briton Gazette, Vol. 2
- Written: 1960
- Released: 1962
- Genre: Folk
- Length: 3:27
- Label: Folkways
- Songwriter: Ewan MacColl

"The Shoals of Herring" (Roud 13642) is a ballad, written by Ewan MacColl for the third of the original eight BBC Radio ballads Singing the Fishing, which was first broadcast on August 16, 1960. Ewan MacColl writes that the song was based on the life of Sam Larner, a fisherman and traditional singer from Winterton-on-Sea, Norfolk, England. Liam Clancy, who performed the song for decades, tells a more nuanced story, saying that MacColl "tape recorded all the old fisherman up along the east coast of England. And he never used one word of his own. ... He rhymed the lines that the fishermen had given him, and he made it into a song..."

It has been recorded by The Spinners, The Dubliners, The Clancy Brothers, The Corries, Three City Four (Martin Carthy, Leon Rosselson, Ralph Trainer and Marian McKenzie), Astrid Nijgh (in Dutch, as De scholen haring), Schooner Fare, Patrick Clifford and Breabach, The Longest Johns . It was also featured on the soundtrack for the 2013 film Inside Llewyn Davis, performed in the film by Oscar Isaac (accompanied on the soundtrack by Punch Brothers).

Being a well-documented song publicised by Mudcat, and Mainly Norfolk, the song was recorded by Jon Boden and Oli Steadman for inclusion in their respective lists of daily folk songs "A Folk Song a Day" and "365 Days Of Folk".

In an example of the folk process, the song's title and refrain have altered to "The Shores of Erin" when sung by some Irish traditional singers.
