= Brian Dunphy =

Irish folk singer

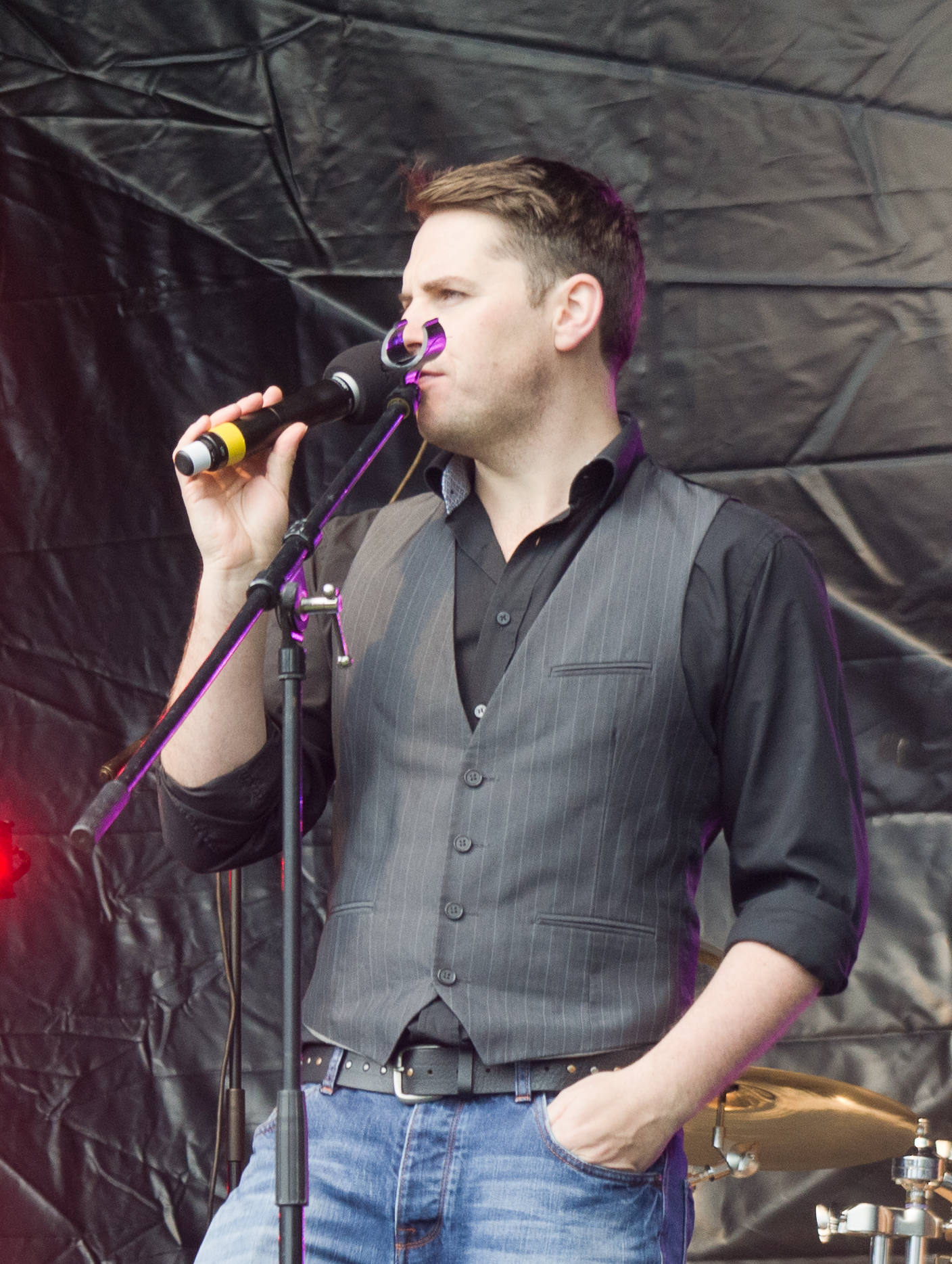
- Dunphy performing in 2011

Background information
- Born: June 17, 1974 (age 52); Dublin, Ireland
- Genres: Irish folk music
- Occupation: Singer
- Instruments: Bodhrán, guitar
- Years active: 1990s–present

Brian Dunphy (born 17 June 1974, Dublin, Ireland) is an Irish folk singer and son of the showband singer Sean Dunphy, who represented Ireland at the Eurovision Song Contest in 1967. As a performer and member of the Irish folk band The High Kings, Brian Dunphy has toured the United States, Ireland and the United Kingdom. He got his start as the lead singer in Riverdance: The Show, which ran on Broadway in New York City. He also joined the Three Irish Tenors, who toured throughout the United States, and was also part of the band Druid. He released a solo album entitled Timeless in 2005. Dunphy later became a member of the four-person Irish folk band The High Kings (2008–present), along with Finbarr Clancy, Darren Holden and Martin Furey. The High Kings have released six albums and toured in the United States, Europe and Australia. Dunphy typically plays the bodhrán and the guitar in the group.
