= The Boston Burglar =

Single by Johnny McEvoy
- B-side: "I Still Miss Someone"
- Released: 1967
- Genre: Folk, Irish
- Label: Pye
- Songwriter: Unknown (Trad.)

The Boston Burglar (Roud 261) was a number one hit in the Irish Charts for Johnny McEvoy in 1967. It is a transportation ballad commonly assumed to have been adapted in America from the sea shanty The Whitby Lad / Botany Bay. before the 20th century. The filk song Banned from Argo's tune was based on this song.

== Synopsis ==
The story tells of a young man who has been well brought up but turns to crime in the city of Boston, in America. Caught, tried and sentenced the man is placed on train to Charlestown, and warns people to be lawful so to not end up incarcerated like him. (Note: The Charlestown neighborhood contained the Charlestown State Prison and the Boston and Maine Railroad passing near to the prison, and thus would be relevant to the song in the 19th century.)
