= Finbarr Clancy =

Irish folk singer and musician

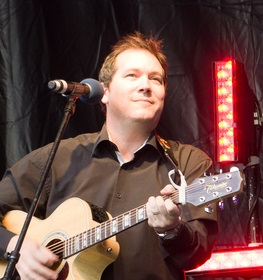
- Finbarr Clancy in Donegal, 2011.

Background information
- Born: 5 March 1970 (age 56); County Tipperary, Ireland
- Origin: Carrick-on-Suir, County Tipperary
- Genres: Traditional Irish; folk; Celtic
- Occupations: Singer; musician
- Instruments: Vocals; guitar; banjo; flute; bass
- Years active: 1978–present

Finbarr Clancy (born 5 March 1970) is an Irish folk singer and multi-instrumentalist. Early in his career he performed with The Clancy Brothers. He later became a member of the group The High Kings.

== Birth and family ==
Finbarr Clancy was the only son born to folk musician Bobby Clancy and Moira Mooney in County Tipperary, Ireland. Bobby Clancy, who was touring with the Clancy Brothers at the time, announced Finbarr's birth on David Frost's television talk show. Finbarr is the nephew of the popular folk singers, Liam Clancy, Paddy Clancy, and Tom Clancy, who helped to spark the Irish folk music revival of the 1960s. Like the Clancy Brothers, he grew up in Carrick-on-Suir in County Tipperary.

Finbarr has sometimes performed with his sister, folk singer Aoife Clancy, and his brother-in-law, Welsh singer Ryland Teifi (the husband of his sister, Roisin).

He married Gráinne Butler in 2008.

== Early career ==
Clancy made his debut at age ten, playing the banjo and singing. In the mid-1990s, he toured the United States and Ireland with the Clancy Brothers. He sang and played 5 string banjo, electric bass and flute with the group, which consisted at the time of Bobby, Paddy, and Liam Clancy and Finbarr's cousin, singer-songwriter Robbie O'Connell. As part of this group, Finbarr appeared in the Clancy Brothers' filmed "Farewell to Ireland" performance in early 1996, which has since been released on DVD.

Later in 1996, after Liam Clancy and Robbie O'Connell left the band, Clancy began touring with his father, uncle Paddy, and American musician Eddie Dillon in the final Clancy Brothers line-up. After Paddy Clancy's death in 1998, Finbarr continued to perform with his father as part of The Clancys and Eddie Dillon. He also performed on four albums with his father before Bobby Clancy's death in 2002. In the mid-2000s, Clancy performed in a group with Dillon and Mark Fitzpatrick.

== The High Kings ==
In 2008, Clancy joined the new Irish ballad group, The High Kings, along with Martin Furey, Darren Holden, and Brian Dunphy. The group's first, eponymous album reached number two on the Billboard World Music chart. In 2013, The High Kings signed with Sony Music.

As part of The High Kings, Clancy has performed before the presidents of the United States and the Republic of Ireland and has appeared on numerous television programs. In addition to singing, he usually plays the guitar and sometimes the banjo with the group.

== Discography/Filmography ==
=== The Clancy Brothers and Robbie O'Connell ===
- Farewell to Ireland, 1996 (DVD)

=== The Clancys and Eddie Dillon ===
- Clancy Sing Along Songs, 1999
- Once in a Lifetime, 2001

=== The High Kings ===
- The High Kings, 2008
- The High Kings in Dublin, 2008 (DVD)
- Memory Lane, 2010
- Live in Ireland, 2011
- Friends for Life, 2013
- Four Friends Live, 2014 (CD & DVD)
- Grace & Glory, 2016
- Decade Best of the High Kings, 2017
- Home from Home (Live), 2020
- The Road Not Taken, 2023

=== Guest appearances ===
Bobby Clancy albums

- Make Me a Cup, 1999
- The Quiet Land, 2000

Cherish the Ladies albums

- At Home, 1999
- The Girls Won't Leave the Boys Alone, 2001
