= Prodigal Sons =

1983 studio album by the Dubliners

Studio album by The Dubliners
- Released: 1983
- Genre: Irish folk
- Label: Polydor
- Producer: Bill Whelan

The Dubliners chronology
21 Years On (1983)	Prodigal Sons (1983)	Live in Carré (1985)

Professional ratings
Review scores
Source	Rating
Allmusic	2/5 stars

Prodigal Sons is a studio album by the Irish folk group The Dubliners. Produced by Bill Whelan, who later became famous for Riverdance, this album featured cellist Nigel Warren-Green as guest musician. Although Luke Kelly recorded his famous versions of "Raglan Road" and "Song for Ireland" during these sessions, neither track featured on this album, although Seán Cannon's version of "Song for Ireland" did. The two Kelly recordings would first appear on the compilation album, Luke's Legacy after his death. The album took its name from John Sheahan's composition, "The Prodigal Son". The album featured both contemporary and traditional songs as well as instrumental pieces.

== Track listing ==
Side One:

1. "Building Up and Tearing England Down" (Dominic Behan)
2. "Jigs - My Darling Asleep/Paddy in London/An Tathair Jack Walsh"
3. "The Newry Highwayman"
4. "When Margaret Was Eleven" (Pete St. John)
5. "Prodigal Son" (John Sheahan)

Side Two:

1. "The Waterford Boys"
2. "Reels - The Humours of Scariff/The Flannel Jacket"
3. "Now I'm Easy" (Eric Bogle)
4. "The Hen's March to the Midden"
5. "Song for Ireland" (Phil Colclough)
6. "Second World Song" (David McDonagh)

All tracks Trad. Arr. The Dubliners unless otherwise stated

== Personnel ==
- Ronnie Drew - guitar, vocals
- Barney McKenna - banjo, mandolin, vocals
- John Sheahan - fiddle, tin whistle, vocals
- Seán Cannon - guitar, vocals
- Eamonn Campbell - guitar
- Des Moore - guitar
- Nigel Warren-Green - cello
- Bill Whelan - keyboards, producer
- Philip Begley - engineer
- Fergus Bourke - photographer
- Dara O Lochlainn - sleeve design
