= Darren Holden (musician) =

Irish singer-songwriter (born 1972)

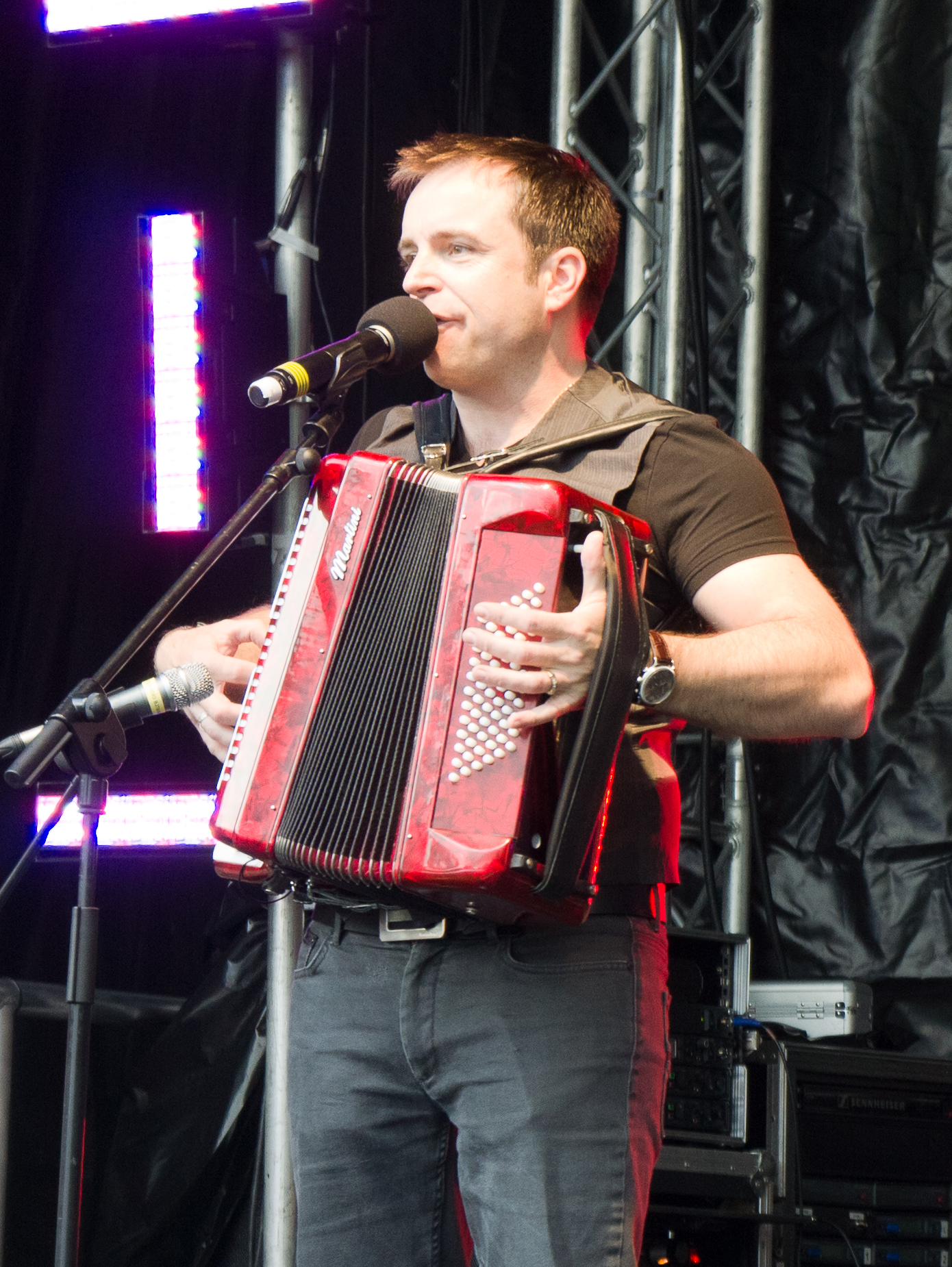

Background information
- Born: 4 July 1972 (age 54)
- Occupations: Musician, singer-songwriter
- Years active: 1986–present
- Labels: Polygram Records, Crashed Records, ARK21/Universal Records, EMI Records, EMI Manhattan, Universal, Sony Records, Celtic Collections, Caroline Records
- Website: darrenholden.net

Darren Richard Holden (born 4 July 1972) is an Irish singer-songwriter who has performed on Broadway as part of Riverdance and Movin' Out and in the national tours for both shows. His debut solo album was released in Ireland in 1998. He later joined the Irish folk group, the High Kings, along with Finbarr Clancy and Brian Dunphy.

== Early life ==
Darren Richard Holden was born on 4 July 1972 in the village of Mooncoin in County Kilkenny.

At the age of 16, Holden joined a band called Wanted, which toured in Ireland, the UK, and the US and performed both original songs and covers in the country rock genre.

== Career ==
=== 1994-1998: Suddenly ===
In his early career, Holden supported artists such as Boyzone, the Backstreet Boys, East 17, Belinda Carlisle, Bonnie Tyler and Paul Young on major tours. Holden's debut single, "After Tonight", released in 1994.

His debut solo album, Suddenly, was released in 1998 and was produced by Ray Hedges. It spawned two charting singles in Ireland: covers of "Don't Give Up On Us" (#23) and "More Than I Can Say" (#20); as well the songs "After Tonight" and "Suddenly" reached the finals to represent Ireland in the Eurovision Song Contest in 1994 and 1997 respectively. The album also features the song "Right to the Very End" which had originally been recorded with the band Wanted but not released.

=== 1999-2006: Rhythm of the Dance, Riverdance and Movin' Out ===
Holden joined the new Irish dance/musical Rhythm of the Dance as lead vocalist in 1999 and spent 10 months performing in Scandinavia, Germany, Hungary, Belgium and Yugoslavia. He joined the Broadway production of Riverdance in February 2000 as a featured vocalist. The show ran for 18 months and included promo slots on NBC's Today Show and CBS' Early Show.

While in New York City, Holden teamed with country music producer Don DiNicola and recorded an album of contemporary/traditional country tunes called Live & Learn. Recording took place in New York as well as at OmniSound in Nashville. Several US country radio stations played the album, and by the end of 2003, three of the tracks had featured heavily on the airplay charts including "Blood and Smoke", which was released by Universal Records, with Miles Copeland's ARK 21 label releasing "Wherever You Are" (a number 17 hit) and "Ecstatic Electricity". Rodney Crowell once referred to Holden as an Irish Bryan White and invited him to Nashville. He co-wrote the song "Wendy's World" with Crowell. His reception was such that Holden was nominated 'Best Country Male Artist' at the 2004 New Music Weekly Awards.

Holden left Riverdance in June 2003 and moved back to Broadway as the lead piano man in the Billy Joel/Twyla Tharp rock musical "Movin' Out". He performed the role on Broadway for six months before originating the lead role for the US National Tour, which ran from January 2004 to January 2007. The show also performed in Toronto and Japan.

In 2004, his rendition of "The Star-Spangled Banner" garnered such respect that he was invited to sing it for President George W. Bush at the White House.

In November 2005, Holden released the download-only song "Through Hell and High Water", which had been written in response to the impacts of Hurricane Katrina. The song was the lead single from Holden's third studio album, Roadworks, which was released on 22 August 2006 and contains two years of material written on the road with the Movin' Out band as well as Tommy Byrnes (Billy Joel, Stray Cats). As well as being sold in the US, the album was distributed by Columbia in Japan where after a TV and radio promotional campaign it sold in excess of 30,000 copies. Its seventh track, "5 Star Day", was included as an instrumental in the soundtrack of the video game Cars Mater-National Championship in 2007, and as of 2025 is the most digitally streamed song of Holden's solo career.

=== 2007-present: The High Kings ===
In June 2007, Holden was invited to become a member of the High Kings, then a new Irish ballad group featuring Brian Dunphy, Finbarr Clancy and Martin Furey.

Their debut CD was released on EMI in February 2008 and hit No. 2 on the Billboard world music charts, as well as hitting the top spot on various Amazon Music charts. It reached No. 7 in their native Ireland and has since been certified platinum. There have been three sold-out tours of the US and Ireland.

Holden performed solo in March 2009 with the Kilkenny Gospel Choir, at St Mary's Cathedral, Kilkenny. He endorsed Optilase Laser Eye Clinic in a TV advertisement. In August 2009, the Sunday World and Daily Mirror newspapers reported that Slash was headhunting Holden to replace Scott Weiland as the new Velvet Revolver lead vocalist. Sources close to the LA-based group confirmed that Holden had been in talks and material had been recorded.

At the Keith Duffy Masquerade Ball on 5 December 2009 in Dublin, Holden was one of the performers, as were Aslan and Keith Barry.

On 9 October 2009 Holden was one of seven Irish celebrities to spend a week in Tanzania while climbing Mount Kilimanjaro in aid of Our Lady's Children's Hospital, Crumlin. An RTÉ television documentary on the event was shown on RTÉ 1 television on 18 July 2011.

The High Kings album Friends for Life was released in 2013, and the opening track was a Holden original called "Oh Maggie", which became the most-played and downloaded song from the album in Ireland, the UK and particularly Germany. The album reached number 5 in the Irish Top 40, Number 3 on Billboard's World Albums chart.

On 30 January 2017 at the Sunday World Entertainment Awards, the High Kings were presented with the final award of the night: "Outstanding achievement in Irish Music around the world". TV3 invited Holden back to The 6 O'Clock Show for a fourth time to discuss the award.

Holden presented some episodes of the SKY TV Channel 389 series Keep it Country which is broadcast in Ireland, the UK and the US. He interviewed some of his industry friends, as well as other singer/songwriters.

After the High Kings played to a sold-out Drexel Hall in Kansas City, Missouri, on 8 March as part of their 2017 US tour, Kansas City Star entertainment correspondent David Freese said that Holden's vocal on "The Town I Loved so Well" was "nothing short of sensational". Standing ovations for Holden's version of this classic song continued across the USA throughout the tour, including in New York City on 12 March when the applause lasted more than 3 minutes according to The New York Times correspondent Jim Fuselli.

On 28 April 2017, Holden was invited to lead the panel on TV3's daytime show The Elaine Show. He was introduced as "the High Kings leader", a tag which The Evening Herald suggested "has been gaining obvious momentum and apparition in recent years" whilst reviewing the episode.

On 24 August 2017, Crashed Records rereleased Holden's "Lady", marking the 20th anniversary of its initial release in 1997. It was dedicated to the memory of Diana, Princess of Wales. Originally a top-20 single, the reaction from fans to the Holden-penned tribute and video sent it to Number 3 on iTunes, the first solo chart placing for Holden since becoming a High King.

On 2 November 2017 Holden appeared again on the TV3's The 6 O'Clock Show, marking his sixth appearance on the show, talking about the High Kings' new album Decade: The Best of the High Kings. The album was released on 3 November 2017 and rose to Number 1 on iTunes.

The band kicked off an Irish tour at the end of March 2018. On 7 June 2018, Holden and The High Kings were nominated for Best Album at the Irish Post Awards at the INEC in Killarney. The band were joined by Phil Coulter for a live performance of their hit "Hand me down my Bible" which was written by Coulter. Holden joined him at the end of the show to play accordion on his song "Thank God this was My Life".

== Charting singles ==
Holden has had a number of singles in the Irish charts:

- "Don't Give Up on Us" – Ireland #23, 1997
- "More Than I Can Say" – Ireland #20, 1997
- "The Rose of Mooncoin" – Ireland #28, 1998
