= The Johnstons =

Irish band

- Origin: Slane, Ireland
- Genres: Folk
- Years active: Early 1960s – 1970s
- Past members: Adrienne Johnston; Lucy Johnston; Michael Johnston; Mick Moloney; Paul Brady; Gavin Spencer

The Johnstons were an Irish close-harmony folk band, founded in Slane, County Meath, Ireland, consisting of siblings Adrienne, Lucy and Michael Johnston.

== Career ==
The Johnstons began performing in the early 1960s in Slane. They signed to Pye Records in 1965 and recorded Ewan MacColl's "The Travelling People", a major hit for them. They added Mick Moloney, who was then becoming a major figure in the Irish music scene, and Paul Brady, while Michael Johnston departed. They continued recording to great success in Ireland, then signed to Transatlantic Records in London, releasing a United Kingdom album called The Johnstons in 1968. This was followed by two albums released on the same day, the traditional The Barleycorn and more contemporary Give a Damn.

When the Johnstons moved to London in 1969 to further their career, Lucy Johnston resigned and stayed in Dublin, leaving Adrienne as the only original Johnston in the group. After moving to London, the Johnstons toured and appeared on British television and radio. They also toured the Netherlands, Scandinavia and Germany, then had a minor hit in the United States with a rendition of "Both Sides Now", by Joni Mitchell. In the United States, they played at the 1971 Philadelphia Folk Festival, and performed at the Gerde's Folk City, and with Bonnie Raitt at Tufts College, Boston; they were also among the first bands to perform in the opening weeks of The Bottom Line nightclub in New York City, in February/March 1974.

Moloney departed in 1971 and was replaced by English guitarist/bass player/singer Gavin Spencer, who went with them for a second tour of the eastern United States in 1972. They recorded a few more albums with limited success, then broke up in 1973. One of their last albums, 1972's The Johnstons, was panned by Robert Christgau, who wrote in Christgau's Record Guide: Rock Albums of the Seventies (1981): "What do you call it when an honest and political Irish folk duo adds strings and horn arrangements for no perceivable purpose, including increased sales? How about shamrock?"

The Johnstons had a reunion concert in Canada in 1976, but never performed again.

Adrienne Johnston married the band's former manager, Chris McCloud. They moved to America and broke off contact with Ireland; Adrienne's friends and family were unable to get in touch with her to let her know of the deaths of her father and other relatives. She was found dead at her apartment in Minneapolis on 27 May 1981, aged 36. The cause of death was given as "cerebral contusions and subdural haematoma", apparently resulting from a fall. Police said there were no suspicious circumstances.
