= Whistle on the Wind =

Studio album by Joanie Madden
- Released: 1994
- Genre: Irish folk
- Label: Green Linnet
- Producer: Gabriel Donohue, Joanie Madden

Joanie Madden chronology
Whistle on the Wind	Song of the Irish Whistle

Professional ratings
Review scores
Source	Rating
Allmusic	4/5 stars

Whistle on the Wind is the first solo album by flute and tin whistle player Joanie Madden.

== Tracks ==
No.	Title	Length
1.	"Marcus Hernon's Air"	4:29
2.	"Johnny Doherty's/Seán Cheo/Lady Gordon"	3:24
3.	"The Idle Road/Tommy Mulhaire's/Ned Coleman's"	3:26
4.	"Uncle Dano's/The Midnight Hornpipe"	2:50
5.	"A Whistle on the Wind/Jug of Punch/Dogs Among the Bushes"	5:15
6.	"Hyne's March/Johnny Harling's/Lasses of Ballintra"	4:14
7.	"Molly Bán/Paddy Lynn's Delite/Jack Maguire's/King of the Clans"	5:33
8.	"Cat's Meow/Partners in Crime"	3:01
9.	"Aggie White's/Miss Thornton/Rip the Calico"	3:32
10.	"Blind Mary"	4:23
11.	"Smiling Lady/Nervous Man/Sean Ryan's"	3:36
12.	"John Brady's/High Reel/Martin Wynne's"	3:57
13.	"Mary Hynes"	4:29

== Musicians ==
- Liam Clancy : Performer, Poetry
- Mary Coogan : Guitar
- Gabriel Donohue : Bass, Bass (Acoustic), bodhrán, Bouzouki, Engineer, Guitar, Piano
- Donny Golden : Dancer
- Eileen Ivers : Fiddle
- Joanie Madden : Flute, Low Whistle, Producer, Whistle (Human), Whistle (Instrument)
- Joe Madden : Accordion
- Johnny McDonagh : Bodhrán
- Alyssa Pava : Cello
- Mark Simos : Guitar
- John Williams : Concertina
