= Áine Furey =

Irish singer

Áine Furey is an Irish singer. She is the daughter of the uileann piper Finbar Furey and the sister of Martin Furey. She and Martin founded a band called Bohinta in 1992. They had a top-ten hit in France, from the album Excalibur, featuring Jean Reno as Merlin. Bohinta released two albums, Sessions and Belladonna. Furey has dueted with Martin and has accompanied others on various releases. She is a graduate of University College Cork.

== Discography ==
=== Solo ===
- Sweetest Summer Rain – 1999
- Cross My Palm – 2008

=== With Bohinta ===
- Belladonna – 1996
- Sessions – 1997

=== Compilation albums ===
- Celtic Woman
- Celtic Woman 2 – 2000

=== Finbar Furey with Martin en Áine ===
- Chasing Moonlight: Love Songs of Ireland – 2003
