= Johnny McEvoy =

Irish singer (1945–2026)

Background information
- Born: 24 April 1945; Banagher, County Offaly, Ireland
- Died: 8 November 2026 (aged 81) Greystones, County Wicklow, Ireland
- Genres: Irish folk; country and Irish
- Occupations: Singer; songwriter; musician
- Instruments: Vocals; guitar; harmonica
- Years active: 1965–2026

Johnny McEvoy (24 April 1945 – 8 November 2026) was an Irish singer and entertainer of the country and Irish genre.

== Background ==
McEvoy was born in Banagher, County Offaly, Ireland, on 24 April 1945, one of four children with two sisters and a brother to John and Emily McEvoy. His father was a bus driver and his mother was a housewife. McEvoy's father was not initially supportive of his musical career: "It wasn't a bad relationship. We just seemed to have no relationship... until, I became famous." His mother, by contrast, was supportive, and suggested that he record "Mursheen Durkin".

He met his wife Odette in 1967 and they married in 1970. The song "The Planter's Daughter" was written about her and references her supposed ancestry from Strongbow. They have two children: Jonathan and Alice.

McEvoy admitted to finding fame "scary" and believed that it triggered his manic depression, an issue he first spoke about on Gay Byrne's talk show in the early 1990s. He gave up drinking in 1979: "Giving up was the easiest thing I ever did and it might have saved my life."

During his wife's illness, he cancelled all tour, recording and travel plans. To stay occupied, he wrote a songbook recounting the songs he has sung over the years, both his own compositions and covers. His wife helped by typing out song lyrics. Odette died of ovarian cancer on 12 November 2013.

McEvoy died at his home in Greystones on 8 November 2026, at the age of 81.

== Career ==
McEvoy was initially part of a duo called "Ramblers Two", the other member being fellow art student Michael Crotty. Their fame was enhanced when they supported the Rolling Stones when they came to Ireland in 1965 in the Adelphi cinema. After a stint touring Ireland and England in the mid-1960s, the two went their separate ways. Johnny McEvoy's first big break came in late 1966 when he recorded "Mursheen Durkin", an old ballad from the west of Ireland. It topped the charts at number one for three consecutive weeks. It was followed by "The Boston Burglar" which also reached number one in the charts. His first tour to the U.S. was in 1967, highlighted by a concert at New York City's Carnegie Hall. It was at this stage he had his third number one Hit with the song "Nora" (a version of "When You and I Were Young, Maggie"), from Seán O'Casey's famous play The Plough and the Stars.

He later formed a band in the 1970s. He wrote his first song "Long Before Your Time". It too reached number one, becoming his fourth and to date last number one in the Irish charts. He went on to write many more songs, many of which have become standards that have been recorded by other artists including "Long Before Your Time", "Michael", "Going To California", "The Ballad of John Williams", "Richman's Garden", "Never Learned To Dance", and "The Ballad of Anne Frank".

In 2010 a documentary on the life and times of Johnny McEvoy, For the Poor and for the Gentry, was televised. For the production of the documentary McEvoy re-recorded his first number one hit, most popular and biggest selling song, "Mursheen Durkin," a collaboration recording with Sharon Shannon and her Big Band. The renewal of the classic was also included on a double album and DVD For the Poor and for the Gentry - The Definitive Johnny McEvoy, which was released later that year.

== Live performances ==
Aside from a recording career, Johnny McEvoy is perhaps best known for his live performances and tours in Ireland and on the international circuit. He has spent many years travelling and performing. In concert, he sang and played acoustic guitar. In the 1970s, he toured with a large band, which included two other guitarists, bass, keyboard and fiddle. In later years, he was often accompanied by only one other guitarist, such as Philip O'Duffy. He typically played a combination of his own compositions and traditional songs such as "Carrickfergus", "The Boston Burglar" and "The Leaving of Liverpool".

== Discography ==
=== Albums ===
- For the Poor and the Gentry (1967)
- With an Eye to Your Eye (1968)
- All Our Wars Were Merry, All Our Songs Are Sad (1969)
- Johnny McEvoy (1973)
- Sounds Like McEvoy (1973)
- Where My Eileen Is Waiting (1975)
- Long Before Your Time (1976)
- Leaves in the Wind (1977)
- I'll Spend a Time with You (1978)
- 20 Greatest Hits (1979)
- Johnny McEvoy Goes Country (1980)
- Since Maggie Went Away (1985)
- Celebration (1995)
- The Legendary Johnny McEvoy (2002)
- Going to California (2003)
- 20 Collected Irish Ballads (2008)
- Basement Sessions (2014)
- Into the Cauldron (2017)

=== Singles ===
List of singles and E.P.s with chart positions
Title	Year	Peak Irish chart position	Notes
Mursheen Durkin	1966	1	As "The Rambler"
Love Minus Zero	1966		As "The Rambler"
The Boston Burglar/ I Still Miss Someone	1967	1	
Funny Man/ Was It You	1967	10	
Black Velvet Band	1967		
Come to the Bower	1967		
About This Time (E.P.)	1967		
Nora/ Tarry Flynn	1968	1	
Hedgehog Song/ Time And Tide Again	1968		
Mary of the Curling Hair	1969		
But That's Alright	1970		
The West's Asleep	1970		
Three Score and Ten/ You Win Again	1971	6	
Paddy's Green Shamrock Shore	1971		
Gentle Annie	1972	8	
Just The Way I Am	1972		As "Gloria and the Johnny McEvoy Band"
Spancil Hill	1972		
All I Have to Offer You is Me	1972	13	
Tomorrow is Forever	1973	14	As "Gloria and the Johnny McEvoy Band" Released as "Super single" with double A and B sides.
When I Sing For Him	1973		As "Gloria and the Johnny McEvoy Band"
Christmas with Johnny McEvoy (E.P.)	1974		
Bedtime Story	1974		
Rose of Moray	1974	6	
Super Single E.P.	1974		
Where My Eileen Is Waiting	1975	2	
Rose of Allendale	1975	6	
Long Before Your Time	1976	1	
The Old Man and the Donkey	1976		
Nora	1977		Re-recording
Bound for Botany Bay/ All in All	1978	16	
Just One More Night	1978		
Anne Devlin	1979		
The Old Rocking Chair/ Lovel Lady	1980		
The Ballad of John Williams	1981		
A Rich Man's Garden	1984	14	
If Wishes were Fishes	1984		
Since Maggie Went Away/ The Losing Game	1985		
Your Seldom Come to See Me Anymore	1987		
Staten Island/ Big Mansion House on the Hill	1988		
Michael/ Pat Murphy's Meadow	1989	17	
Runaround Angel	1990	21	
As Soon As I Can	1991		
Long Way from the Sun/ Wheels go Round	1991		
Roseville Fair	1992		
