= Heritage commodification =

Cultural tourism issue

Heritage commodification is the process by which cultural themes and expressions come to be evaluated primarily in terms of their exchange value, specifically within the context of cultural tourism. These cultural expressions and aspects of heritage become "cultural goods," transformed into commodities to be bought, sold and profited from in the heritage tourism industry. In the context of modern globalization, complex and often contradictory layers of meaning are produced in local societies, and the marketing of one's cultural expressions can degrade a particular culture while simultaneously assisting in its integration into the global economy. The repatriation of profits, or "leakage", that occurs with the influx of tourist capital into a heritage tourist site (including handicraft vendors, food vendors, basket makers, and several other items that are produced locally and rely upon tourist capital) is a crucial part of any sustainable development that can be considered beneficial to local communities. Modern heritage tourism reproduces an economic dynamic that is dependent upon capital from tourists and corporations in creating sustained viability. Tourism is often directly tied to economic development, so many populations see globalization as providing increased access to vital medical services and important commodities.

Statue of a Sphinx at the Musée du Louvre, Paris, France

The tourism industry has been rapidly growing during the past two decades, and the expansion will probably continue well into the future. There were nearly one billion tourist arrivals in 2008^{(to where?)}, compared to only twenty-five million in 1950. Moreover, in 2008, tourism directly accounted for nearly one trillion US dollars. Worldwide, approximately five percent of GDP is generated by tourism, and a similar proportion of people are employed in the tourism industry. As each individual culture positioned for tourism needs a particular "selling point" in order to attract tourist capital, certain aspects of their heritage are allowed to be appropriated in order to give the tourist the impression that he or she is receiving an "authentic" experience. In this way, tourism also provides opportunities for communities to define who they are and bolster their identities through the commodification of certain cultural aspects that the community deems important and worthy of reproduction. Tourist destinations must have a specific set of characteristics that set themselves apart from every other destination, and this is where local communities choose how they will represent themselves to the world. This power to create an identity and reproduce the mechanisms of a group's identity in the realm of cultural tourism allows local populations to express their ethnic pride and "imbue places and events with identities that best represent their particular interests and values".

== Authenticity and the tourist gaze ==
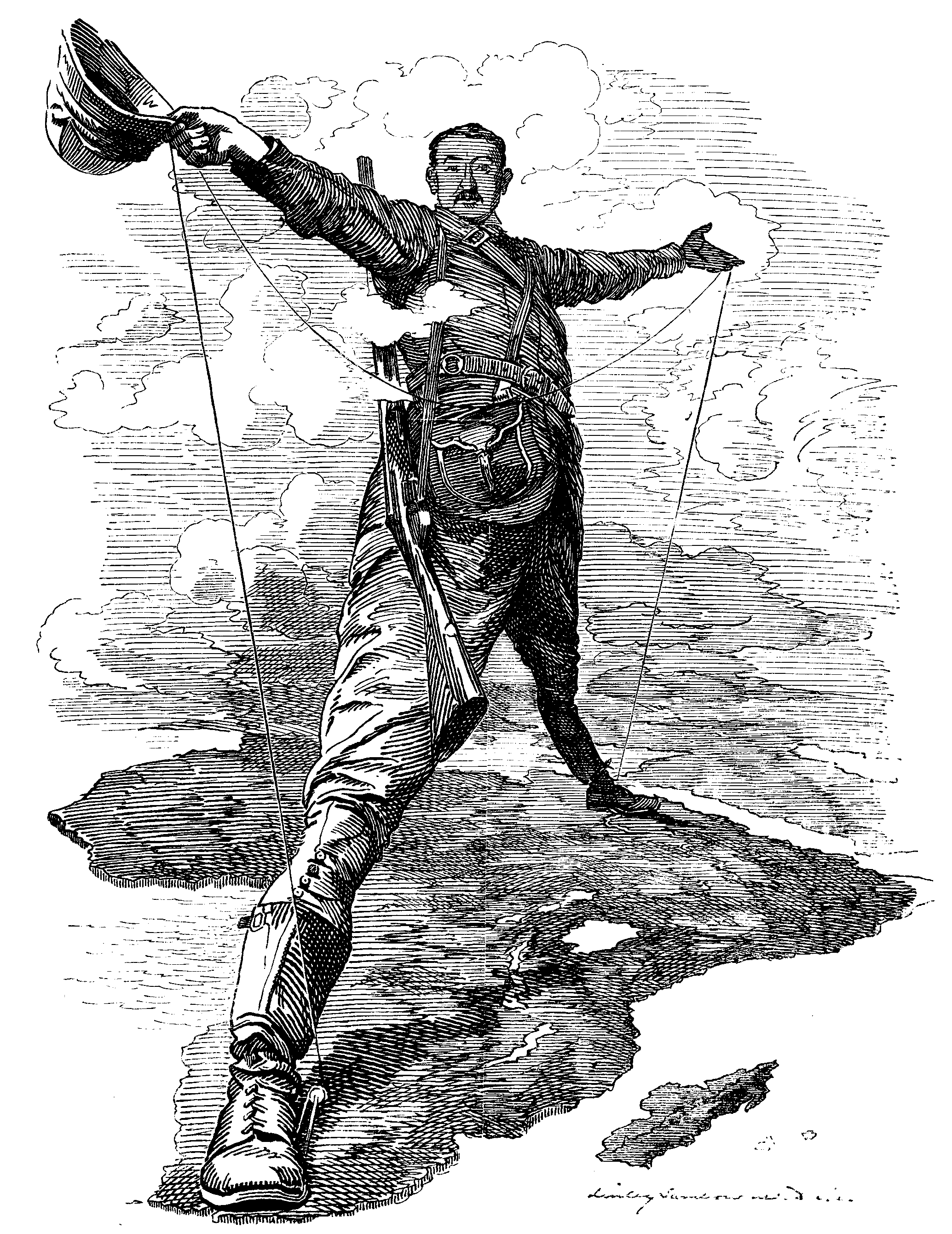
Imperialist Cecil Rhodes, during the Scramble for Africa

The "tourist gaze" is explained by sociologist John Urry as the set of expectations that tourists place on local populations when they participate in heritage tourism, in the search for having an "authentic" experience. In response to tourist expectations and often cultural and racial stereotypes, local populations reflect back the "gaze" of the expectations of tourists in order to benefit financially. Tourists cannot bear all of the blame for this process, however, as the aggressively promoted marketing efforts of tour operators, popular media, and local governments all contribute to the production of the tourist "gaze". This gaze is often described as a destructive process, in which often important local cultural expressions are reduced to commodities, and these traditions fall out of favor with local populations. They can also be destructive in that local populations become consumed by an economic process which values certain cultural expressions over others, and cultural themes that cannot be easily commodified fall out of favor and can be eventually lost. This gaze can also serve as a booster of ethnic identity, as it can revive cultural traditions that may have fallen out of favor under the vestiges of colonialism and imperialism. Because of the importance of tourist capital in many local societies, indigenous peoples are placed in a dynamic where cultural "authenticity" becomes something very tangible and necessary to achieve economic success. This "reconstruction of ethnicity" becomes important, because locals tend to act out cultural patterns and behaviors that they believe would satisfy tourists most. The local populations play on stereotypes that Westerners have on their cultures, and seek to perform them as best they can to satisfy the consumer demand. The power that the "tourist gaze" has in supporting ethnic pride and identity can also be used to destroy ethnic pride and identity, in the cases where tourist expectations do not align with the everyday reality of local populations. In the village of San Jose Succotz in Belize, local Mayan populations had given up many of their traditional practices and traditions. However, because of their close proximity to ancient Maya ruins and the resultant tourist interest in their areas, the villagers began to go back into the past and recreate traditional Maya cultural patterns and traditions. In recreating these images, their identities were changed completely and they were placed back within an "ethnographic present" of classical Maya indigenous cultural expressions and land use patterns. Unfortunately, this 'act' also gives more savvy tourists the impression that the Maya are extinct, and their traditions are only being reenacted by local populations, obscuring the reality that there are over a million Maya alive today.

== Contested authenticity ==
One anthropologist has studied how in one Maya village of Yucatán, Mexico, involvement in tourism is seen as dangerous and urban Maya are seen as outsiders to the traditional Maya society. Maya villages that supply much of the migrant labor that goes to Cancun and other tourist destinations also reflect on what it means to be Maya, and migrants who go to Cancun are seen as "less Maya" than those who stay behind. The migrant workers follow the promise of jobs and socioeconomic advancement to the tourist destinations of Cancun, and in the process they are considered to be "de-Mayanized" by traditional Maya. Traditional Maya "de-ethnicize" urban Maya people as a strategy to keep their traditional ways of life intact. This one anthropologist believes that the traditional Maya fear the urbanization of Maya people because of the cultural commodification that often accompanies the tourism industry. This potential commodification is seen as detrimental to traditional Maya ways of life, mostly by anthropologists who carry a negative ideological perspective on tourism. This idea however cannot be generalized to other Maya communities in Yucatán or even to other indigenous communities in Mexico or anywhere else in Latin America. In contrast, there are examples throughout Yucatán and Quintana Roo where Maya people are heavily involved in tourism service sector in positive and willing ways. In contrast to the one community mentioned above, Maya communities such as Tulum, Rio Lagartos, Holbox, Isla Mujeres, Dzitnup, Ebtun, Piste, Santa Elena, and Xcalacoop, to mention a few have local economies fully integrated into the tourism network and also maintain traditional culture. Because tourism is an economic service industry that is created out of capitalism there is therefore always unequal benefits; this happens regardless of the racial or cultural identities of those who benefit and those who do not benefit as much. While the Maya people are not required to engage in the tourism industry, tourism often incorporates entire Maya towns and marketplaces. Although most of the people involved in the informal sector are aware of their subordinate economic roles in a larger global system, handicraft vendors continue to 'perform' for Western tourists in order to make their cultural commodities and 'goods' appear to be more 'authentic' and receive tourist capital. This disjunction between public performance and daily life is a perpetual reality for many Maya people living and working in Central America. Heritage tourism excursions tend to be associated with one ethnic group in a given locality. In this context, topic and place becomes the defining characteristic of a people to the exclusion of other perspectives. This creates a dynamic where tourists use the "questioning gaze", in which travelers' questions and skepticism penetrate the commercial presentation of the site, and undermine the producer's dominant narrative. If a tourist feels that a heritage site is producing a dubious interpretation of a cultural expression or experience, the site loses its "authenticity" and it becomes less marketable, and harder to commodify. Three sites in Kenya trace the commodification of particular aspects of the Maasai tribal culture, and how these sites are marketed with varying degrees of commodification and authenticity in order to satisfy tourist expectations.

=== Mayers Ranch ===
This site, built by a British family in the Great Rift Valley 30 miles away from Nairobi, commodified Maasai cultural expressions through historic reenactments of Maasai warriors in traditional song and dance, at a comfortably safe distance away from tourists. In these performances, Maasai culture is presented as ahistorical and static. There was a painstaking strife for satisfying the tourist "gaze" and providing a sense of authenticity, most notably through contrasts between civilized European and primitive African. This site was eventually closed by the Kenyan government because of the colonial nature of the presentation of Maasai culture was offensive to many Kenyans (because whites were producing images of blacks) and African-Americans.

=== Bomas Village of Kenya ===
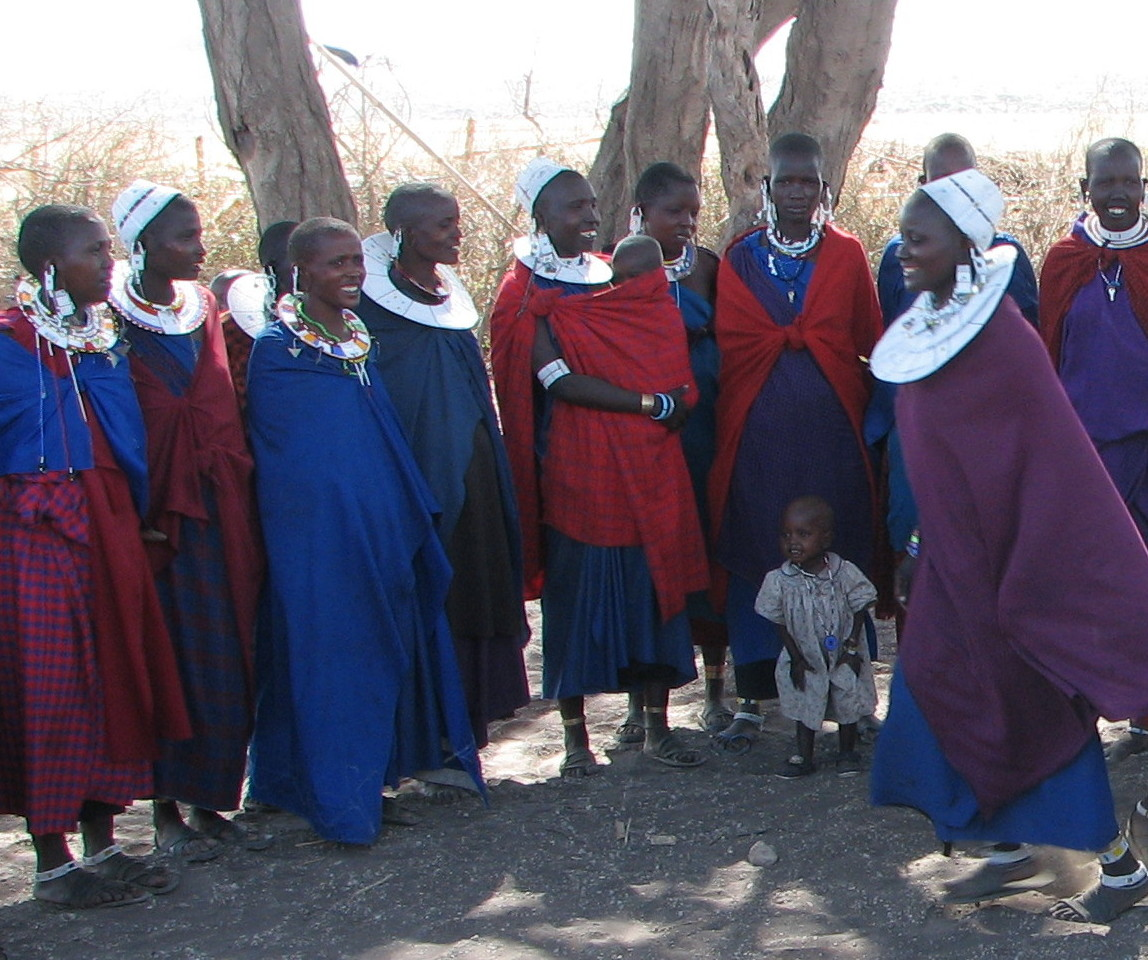
Maasai women and children in Kenya

This historic site caters mostly by urban Kenyans, so the commodification of these particular themes are especially problematic, as in this case, most of the tourists are actually stakeholders in the historic representation being marketed at this site. To give a critical sense of authenticity, national folklore troupes were formed to tell stories that purposely promote Kenyan nationalism/equality among ethnic groups. There are performances in a modern stadium arena, which creates a juxtaposition of modern and traditional that reflects greater Kenyan society. The representation of several Kenyan ethnic groups and culturally relevant narratives express a politically charged message – Kenyan nationalism. When the tourists that visit the site are the actual stakeholders in the process, culture cannot simply be commodified as a good. The commodification of the Maasai culture is locally managed and produced in this circumstance.

=== Kichwa Tembo (Out of Africa Sundowner) ===
This is an upscale tourist site that caters mostly to wealthy Western tourists. At this historic site, Maasai performers mix with tourists during performance, involving them into many aspects of the performance. Pop culture images of Africa dominate performance, reckoning back to classic movies such as Out of Africa. All of the comforts of home are present in the luxury lodges, and the site is mostly catered towards the entertainment of tourists, not necessarily 'authenticity'. In this instance, the tourist gaze is used as a pretext for the greater luxury experience of an upscale, African safari. All of the historical tensions and contrasts are dissolved, and performances include a mash-up of Hakuna matata, Kum Bah Ya, and Jamaican reggae. These elements all meld together nonsensically into a locally placed African context. The Maasai culture is commodified into a representation of a popular American image of what African cultures are – not authentic African performances. These performances provide the greater accessibility of safe, pleasant primitives. The Maasai are stakeholders in process, but have relatively minor control over their representation, as tour agency production forces are hidden but dominate the interpretive process. Many of the Maasai people are forced into a willingness to play into the commodified stereotypes of their culture for economic benefit.

== Place as a commodity: eco-tourism ==
The specific natural attributes of a place also can become commodities, as the environment of a locale can become a "good", just as important as the cultural heritage in attracting tourist capital. A population's heritage is indubitably tied to their local environment. However, in the case of eco-tourism, education about sustainability and preservation are common themes that emerge in the rhetoric of the industry. An alternative form of tourism, ecotourism is defined as "a form of tourism inspired primarily by the natural history of an area, including its indigenous cultures". Ecotourism has a generally low impact on local environments, and it allows tourists to gain an appreciation for the natural resources and attributes of the tourist destination. These tourist programs provide capital that can be used to improve the economic situations of local environments, as well as help fund conservation efforts to offset years of environmental degradation caused by tourist activity. Because of the conservational goals of ecotourism, local communities have the opportunity to engage more with governmental organizations, non-governmental organizations, and private tourist firms in the design and production of tourist destinations. Ecotourism can offer local populations political and economic agency over the products of their labor, and levy a degree of control over their economic development.
