= The Back Door (album) =

Studio album by Cherish the Ladies
- Released: 1992
- Genre: Celtic
- Length: 45:11
- Label: Green Linnet

Cherish the Ladies chronology
The Back Door	Out and About

Professional ratings
Review scores
Source	Rating
Allmusic	4.5/5 stars

The Back Door, an album by Cherish the Ladies, was released in 1992 on the Green Linnet label.

== Track listing ==
1. "Characters' Polka/The Warlock/The Volunteer/The Donegal Traveler" – 3:54
2. "The Back Door" – 4:23
3. "Redican's/Sean Ryan's/Take the Bull by the Horns" – 3:29
4. "The Dance: Galway Hornpipe/Dessie O'Connor's/The Moher Reel" – 2:06
5. "Coal Quay Market – The Shopping Song /Happy Days/Rabbit in the Field" – 3:02
6. "Máire Mhór" – 1:00
7. "If Ever You Were Mine" – 3:32
8. "Paddy O'Brien's/Toss The Feathers/Jenny Dang the Weaver" – 3:10
9. "My Own Native Land" – 4:00
10. "Pepin Arsenault/The Shepherd's Daughter/A Punch in the Dark" – 2:50
11. "Three Weeks We Were Wed" – 3:04
12. "Jessica's Polka/Tear the Calico/I Have No Money" – 4:07
13. "Carrigdhoun" – 2:30
14. "Redican's Mother/Humours of Westport/The Morning Dew/The Glass of Beer/Youghal Harbor" – 4:04
