= New Day Dawning (Cherish the Ladies album) =

Studio album by Cherish the Ladies
- Released: September 3, 1996
- Genre: Celtic
- Length: 54:49
- Label: Green Linnet

Cherish the Ladies chronology
Out and About	New Day Dawning	Live (Cherish the Ladies album)

Professional ratings
Review scores
Source	Rating
Allmusic	4/5 stars

New Day Dawning, an album by Cherish the Ladies, was released in 1996 on the Green Linnet label.

== Track listing ==
1. "Highway to Kilkenny/The Boys of Portaferry/The Abbey Reel/Ashmaleen House" – 3:38
2. "Green Grow the Rushes, O" – 4:48
3. "Peter Murphy's/The Ballinakill Ditch/Barrel Rafferty's Jig" – 4:04
4. "A Neansaí Mhíle Gra" – 5:30
5. "Crowley's Reels/Tom Ward's Downfall" – 3:17
6. "Green Cottage Polka/Jer O'Connell's/Tom's Tavern" – 3:06
7. "Lord Mayo" – 3:08
8. "The Galway Rover" – 3:51
9. "New Broom/Joe Ryan's Barn Dance/St. Ruth's Bush/The Penny Candle" – 5:35
10. "Ned of the Hill" – 4:24
11. "Broken Wings" – 5:16
12. "Rayleen's Reel/The Pullet/Scotch Mary/Within a Mile of Dublin" – 5:15
13. "Keg of Brandy" – 2:57
