= The High Kings =

Irish folk music group

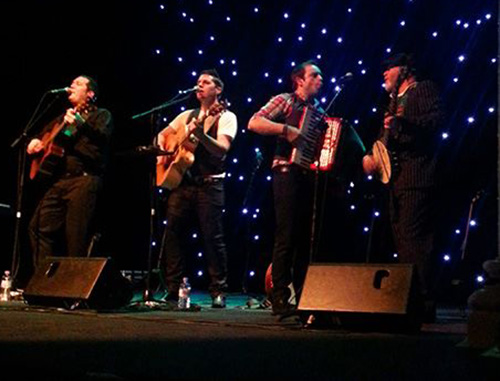
- The High Kings performing in 2012 in Waterford, Ireland.

Background information
- Origin: Ireland
- Genres: Traditional Irish, folk, Celtic, Country
- Years active: 2008–present
- Labels: Sony Music, Manhattan Records, Universal Music, Ard Ri Entertainment, Celtic Collections
- Members: Finbarr Clancy; Brian Dunphy; Darren Holden; Paul O'Brien
- Past members: Martin Furey; George Murphy
- Website: thehighkings.com

The High Kings is an Irish folk group formed in Dublin in 2008. The band consists of Finbarr Clancy, Brian Dunphy, Darren Holden, and Paul O'Brien. As of 2023, the group had released five studio albums, four live albums, two live DVDs, and one greatest hits album. Their first three studio albums appeared at number three or higher on the Billboard world music chart, the first two went platinum in Ireland, and all of their albums charted in Ireland.

After the release of their first album, the new group moved from a highly staged format to a more natural performance style. Their third album Friends for Life contains both traditional Irish songs, as well as some original songs. Since the inception of the group, it has toured Ireland, the United States, and Europe on several occasions. Although they sing mostly traditional Irish songs, they are also known to sing arrangements of songs from other genres.

== Members ==
Finbarr Clancy toured the United States and Ireland in the 1990s with the Clancy Brothers, one of the most successful folk groups in Irish traditional music. He sang and played 5 string banjo, electric bass and flute with the group, which consisted at the time of Finbarr's father, Bobby Clancy, his uncles Paddy Clancy and Liam Clancy, and his cousin, singer-songwriter Robbie O'Connell. As part of this group, Finbarr appeared in the Clancy Brothers' filmed Farewell to Ireland performance in 1996, which has since been released on DVD. He also performed on three albums with this father. He usually plays the guitar and sometimes the banjo with The High Kings.

Brian Dunphy got his first break as a performer in Riverdance: The Show. After two years as part of Riverdance, he became a member of The Three Irish Tenors. Dunphy had also been a member of the band Druid. He released a solo album entitled, Timeless, as well, in which Darren helped cowrite some of the original material. Brian is the son of Sean Dunphy, who represented Ireland in the 1967 Eurovision Song Contest. He typically plays the bodhrán and guitar with the group.

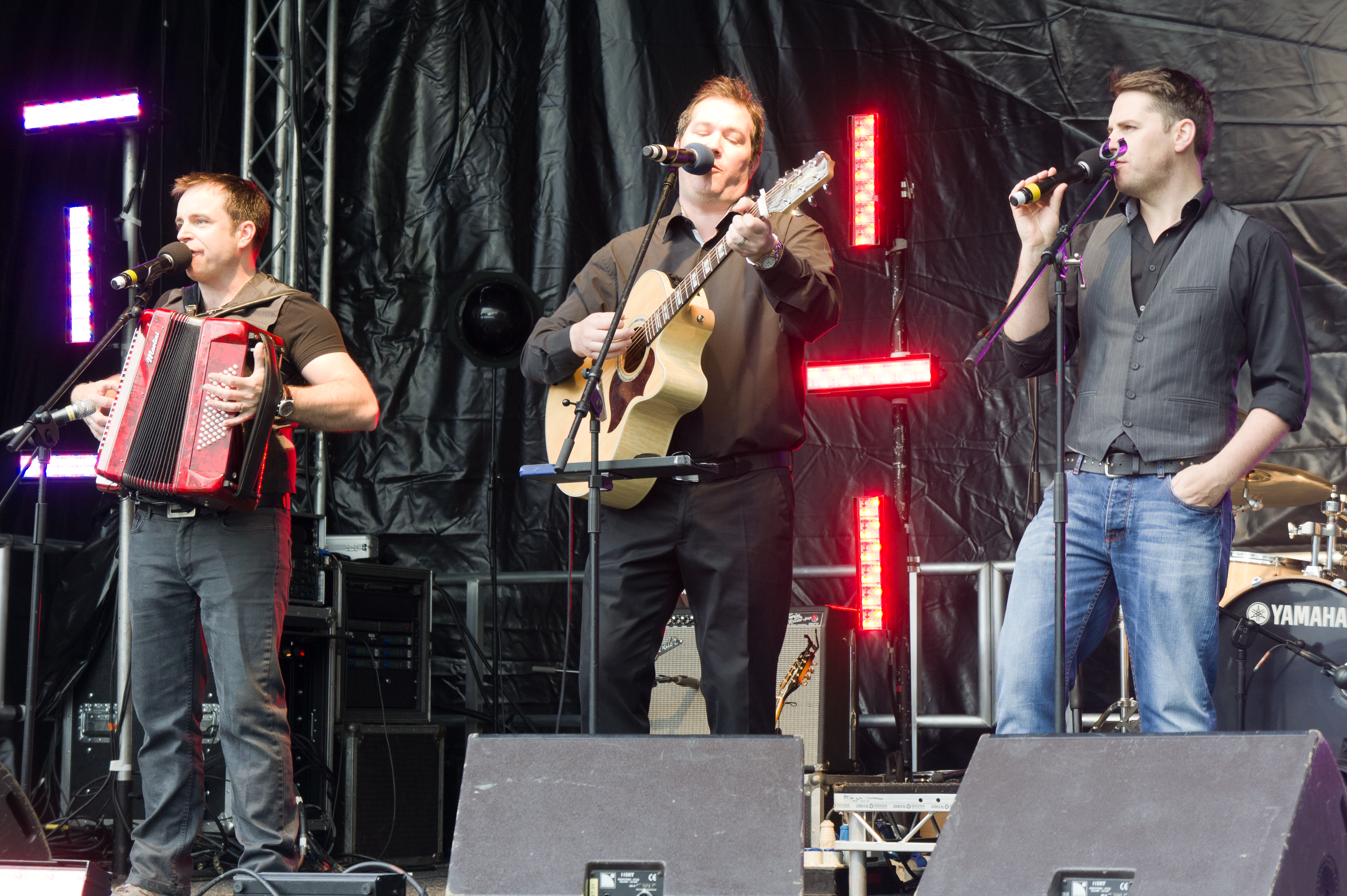
Darren Holden, Finbarr Clancy, and Brian Dunphy perform at a High Kings concert in Iveagh Gardens, 2011.

Martin Furey, son of Irish folk musician Finbar Furey, formed the band Bohinta with his sister Áine in 1992. They had a top ten hit in France with the album Excalibur, featuring Jean Reno as Merlin. Bohinta released two albums. Furey left the band in September 2017.

Darren Holden starred in Riverdance: The Show on Broadway for eighteen months. He followed this success by appearing in the Broadway musical Movin' Out. Holden played the role of Billy Joel both on Broadway and on a national tour of the United States (January 2004 – January 2007), as well as tours of Canada and Japan in 2006. Holden has also released three successful solo albums. Suddenly was released in 1998 and yielded three top 20 singles in Ireland and one top 30 in Finland. Live and Learn was released in the United States in March 2003, garnering three top 40 airplay hits on the country music charts. Roadworks followed in 2006 with success in Japan where it sold 20,000 copies. Holden plays the accordion, mandolin, guitar and keyboard with The High Kings. He continues to perform solo shows when not with The High Kings.

== Timeline ==
The High Kings' first album reached number two on Billboard Magazine's World Music chart. The album spent a total of thirty-six weeks on the chart.

In 2008, the High Kings toured the United States with Celtic Woman as the opening act.

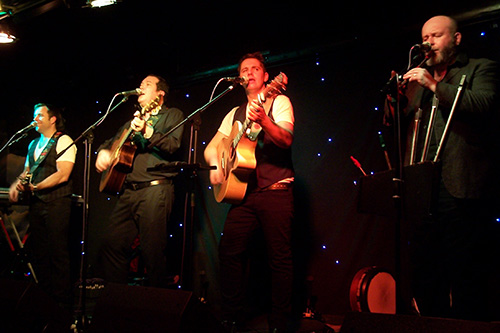
The High Kings perform on stage in London, December 2011. (l-r) Darren Holden, Finbarr Clancy, Brian Dunphy, Martin Furey

In 2011, the High Kings toured the US again, playing in Chicago, Albany, New Haven, Philadelphia, Boston and Atlanta to promote their new album release "Memory Lane," which eventually reached the third spot on Billboard's Top World Albums chart. On St. Patrick's Day, they played for an American audience on "Live with Regis and Kelly," and performed on stage in Boston that night.

On 18 March 2012 the High Kings headlined the Mayor of London's St Patrick's Day celebrations in Trafalgar Square to an estimated 15,000 people.

On 20 March 2012 The High Kings were invited to perform at the Official St Patrick's Day Celebrations at The White House in Washington DC, United States. The event was hosted by US President Barack Obama and attended by Taoiseach Enda Kenny.

On 6 July 2012 The High Kings were invited to perform at the residence of the President of Ireland Michael D Higgins.

On 12 March 2013 The High Kings announced a forthcoming third studio album produced by Sharon Shannon and John Dunford, consisting of eight original songs and a selection of classic ballads. On 23 September 2013 The High Kings released Friends For Life on the Sony record label. The album reached number three on the Billboard Top World Albums chart.

In 2016 the band performed at RTÉ's Centenary Concert to mark the 100-year anniversary of Ireland's Easter Rising.

In June 2016 the band played all 3 stages at the Isle of Wight Festival, followed by a performance at Glastonbury Festival 2016 on the Acoustic Stage. The band also undertook a tour of the US in 2016.

"Hand Me Down My Bible" was released as a single in July 2016 and quickly became played on many radio stations in Ireland to much acclaim. In late December 2016, the High Kings began their Grace & Glory tour. The event began on 27 December 2016 in Belfast. The related album contained traditional Irish music, ranging from religious songs to pub music.

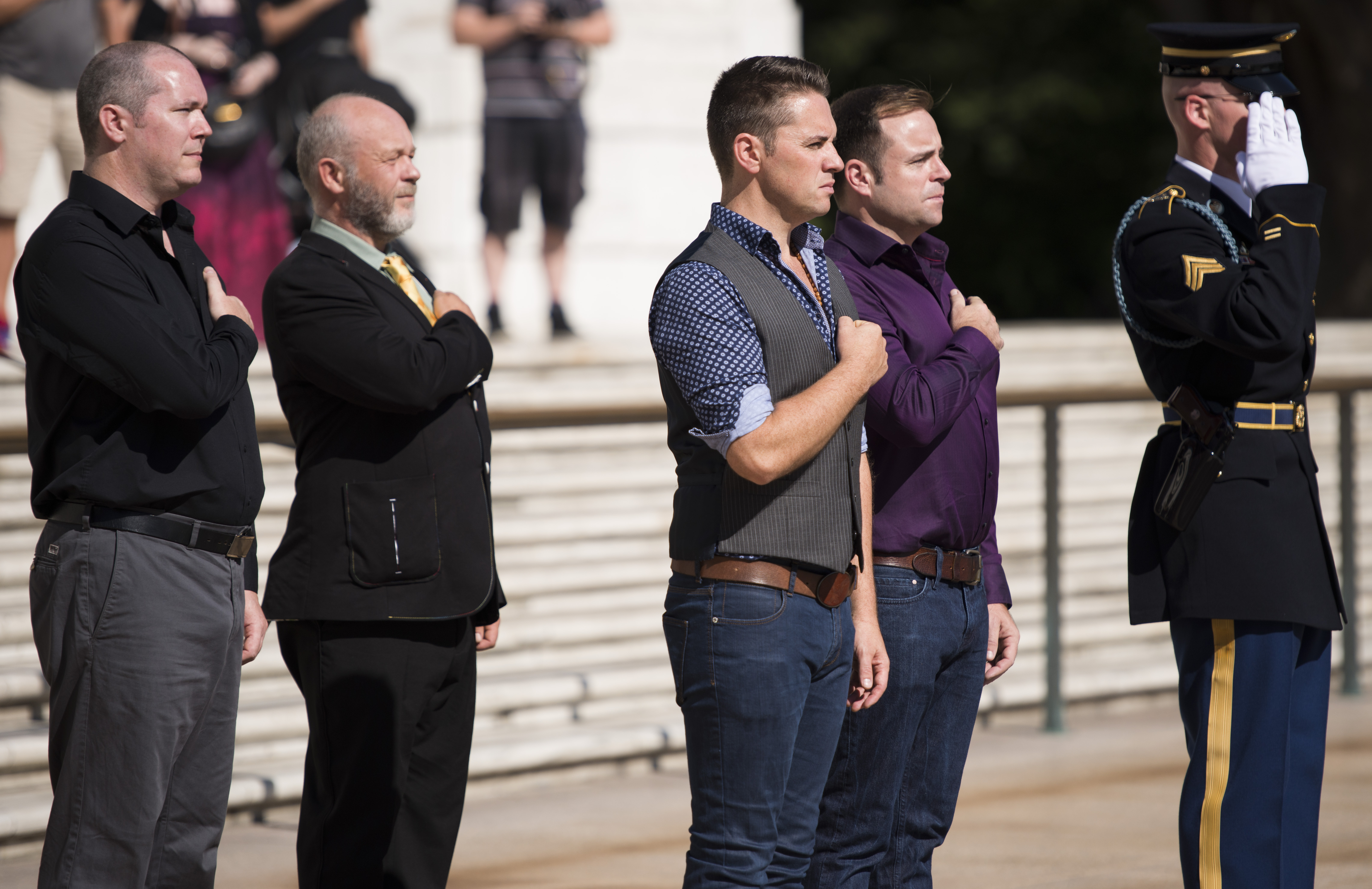
The High Kings lay a wreath at the Tomb of the Unknown Soldier in Arlington National Cemetery on September 8, 2015

In September 2017 the band announced that Martin Furey would be retiring from The High Kings, and that an announcement would be made later regarding his replacement. In October 2017, they announced that George Murphy would join them on a Canadian tour, and he was later added as a permanent member of The High Kings. Murphy continued to perform with the group from 2017 to 2019 before announcing that he would be "stepping away to focus on his solo career". Paul O'Brien joined the group in 2019 to replace Murphy. O'Brien plays the tin whistle, among other instruments.

The High Kings announced that they would be debuting an album in November 2017, titled Decade: The Best of The High Kings.

In June 2023, The High Kings released "The Road Not Taken", their first album consisting entirely of original music. One of the album's tracks, "Streets of Kinsale", features a collaboration with Steve Perry, the former lead singer of Journey.

In 2024, the High Kings teamed up with Gaelic Storm for a co-headlining Mighty Tour II. The bands took turns performing first each night, and came together at the end of each show to perform a few songs together.

== Discography ==
The group's first two albums went platinum.

Title	Date of release	Media format	Record label	Chart positions			
Title	Date of release	Media format	Record label	IRE	US	US World	US Indie
The High Kings	2008	CD	Manhattan Records	7	150	2	—
Live in Dublin	2008	DVD	The Blue Note Label Group	n.a.	n.a.	n.a.	n.a.
Memory Lane	2010	CD	Universal Music Ireland	5	—	3	46
Live in Ireland	2011	CD	Celtic Collections	11	—	—	—
Friends for Life	2013	CD	Sony Music Entertainment	5	—	3	—
Four Friends Live	2015	CD/DVD	Celtic Collections	—	—	—	—
Grace & Glory	2016	CD	Celtic Collections	3	—	11	—
Decade: The Best of the High Kings	2017	CD	Celtic Collections	6	—	—	—
Home from Home (live)	2020	CD	Celtic Collections	—	—	—	—
The Road Not Taken	2023	CD	Celtic Collections	2	—	—	—
