= Out and About (Cherish the Ladies album) =

Studio album by Cherish the Ladies
- Released: May 1993
- Genre: Celtic
- Length: 49:53
- Label: Green Linnet

Cherish the Ladies chronology
The Back Door	Out and About	New Day Dawning

Professional ratings
Review scores
Source	Rating
Allmusic	3/5 stars

Out and About is an album by Cherish the Ladies that was released in 1993 on the Green Linnet label. It is the final album with Cathie Ryan as the band's singer.

== Track listing ==
1. "The Old Favorite/The Flogging Reel/Leave My Way/The Kerryman" – 4:20
2. "Spoon River" – 4:44
3. "The Ladies of Carrick/The Kinnegad Slashers/Old Man Dillon" – 3:54
4. "Declan's Waltz/Waltz Duhamel" – 4:28
5. "The Cameronian Set: Tha M'Intinn Raoir/Duke of Gordon/The Cameronian/Lady of the House" – 5:25
6. "Inisheer" – 3:00
7. "O'Keefe's/The Shepherd's Lamb/Johnny O'Leary's" – 3:31
8. "Roisin Dubh – The Small Black Rose" – 3:13
9. "Le Voyage de Camouret/House of Hamill" – 4:37
10. "The Cat Rambles to the Child's Saucepan/Maire O'Keefe/Harry Bradshaw's" – 3:18
11. "The Missing Piece" – 4:14
12. "The Out and About Set: The Wandering Minstrel/Fred Rice's Polka/The Cabin Hunter/Out and About" – 5:09
