= One and All: The Best of Cherish the Ladies =

Compilation album by Cherish the Ladies
- Released: February 24, 1998
- Genre: Celtic
- Length: 27:01
- Label: Green Linnet
- Producer: Eileen Ivers, Gabriel Donohue

Cherish the Ladies chronology
Live	One and All: The Best of Cherish the Ladies	Threads of Time

Professional ratings
Review scores
Source	Rating
Allmusic	4.5/5 stars

One and All: The Best of Cherish the Ladies, an album by Cherish the Ladies, was released in 1998 on the Green Linnet label.

== Track listing ==
1. "The Cat Rambles to the Child's Saucepan/Maire O'Keefe/Harry Bradshaw's" – 3:20
2. "The Cameronian Set: Tha M'Intinn Raoir/Duke of Gordon/The Cameronian/Lady of the House" – 5:26
3. "The Green Cottage Polka/Jer O'Connell's/Tom's Tavern" – 3:06
4. "Broken Wings" – 5:16
5. "Declan's Waltz/Waltz Duhamel" – 3:28
6. "A Neansaí Mhíle Grá" – 5:30
7. "Highway to Kilkenny/The Boys of Portaferry/The Abbey Reel/Ashmaleen House" – 3:38
8. "Three Weeks We Were Wed" – 3:04
9. "O'Keefe's/The Shepherd's Lamb/Johnny O'Leary's" – 3:31
10. "Green Grow the Rushes Oh" – 4:48
11. "Jessica's Polka/Tear the Calico/I Have No Money" – 4:08
12. "The Back Door" – 4:23
13. "Crowley's Reels/Tom Ward's Downfall" – 3:17
14. "My Own Native Land" – 4:00
15. "Joe Ryan's Barn Dance Set: The New Broom/Joe Ryan's Barn Dance/St. Ruth's Bush/The Penny Candle" – 5:32
