= Another Son =

Studio album by Four to the Bar
- Released: June 1995
- Recorded: February 1995
- Genre: Celtic; folk; folk rock
- Label: Independent
- Producer: Four to the Bar

Four to the Bar chronology
Craic on the Road (1994)	Another Son (1995)

Another Son was the second full-length album and final recording by Four to the Bar, released in 1995.

The album was a radical departure from their first, 1994's Craic on the Road.

The band is listed as producing the album. Engineer Tim Hatfield has also been credited with playing a significant role in the success of the record.

== Track listing ==
1. "The Newry Highwayman" (Traditional)
2. "Another Son" (Kelleher)
3. "The Western Shore" (Clifford)
4. "Shelli Sullivan's/Passing My Time/Marie Harvey's Delight" (O'Neill)
5. "NY's for Paddy" (Yeates)
6. "Something's Come In" (Kelleher)
7. "Catch the Wind" (Donovan)
8. "The World Turned Upside-Down" (Rosselson)
9. "The Shores of America" (Kelleher)
10. "The Old Men Admiring Themselves in the Water" (W. B. Yeats (lyrics); Clifford (music))
11. "Skibbereen" (Traditional)
12. "Getting Medieval" (Traditional)
13. "No Matter Where You Go" (Kelleher)

== Personnel ==
- David Yeates: Vocals, bodhran, flute, tin whistle, percussion
- Martin Kelleher: Guitar, bouzouki, five-string banjo, backing vocals
- Patrick Clifford: Bass guitar, piano, electric guitar
- Keith O'Neill: Fiddle, tenor banjo

== Production ==
- Produced by Four to the Bar
- Engineered by Tim Hatfield
- Recorded at O'Neill's Irish Castle, Poughkeepsie, NY
- Mixed at Mastermix Recording, New York, NY
- Mastered at Steller Productions, New York, NY
- Manufactured and printed by Disc Makers, USA
