= Cherish the Ladies =

American Celtic music group

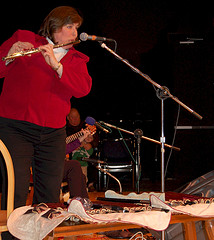
- Joanie Madden

Background information
- Origin: New York City
- Genres: Irish folk, Celtic
- Years active: 1985–present
- Members: Joanie Madden; Mary Coogan; Mirella Murray; Nollaig Casey; Kathleen Boyle; Kate Purcell
- Past members: Aoife Clancy; Eimear Arkins; Siobhan Egan; Winifred Horan; Eileen Ivers; Liz Knowles; Donna Long; Maureen Doherty Macken; Mary Rafferty; Deirdre Connolly; Marie Reilly; Cathie Ryan; Heidi Talbot; Michelle Burke; Roisin Dillon
- Website: www.cherishtheladies.com

Cherish the Ladies is an American female super group that plays Celtic music. The band began as a concert series in New York in January 1985. It was the brainchild of Mick Moloney who wanted to showcase female musicians in America in what had been a male-dominated scene. The group took its name from a traditional Irish jig called "Cherish the Ladies", and the series opened to sold-out concerts. Their leader Joanie Madden plays flute and tin whistle. The other members of the group play a wide variety of instruments. Their albums contain both tunes (instrumental tracks) and songs (tracks with vocals).

== Background ==
Joanie Madden was born in the Bronx, New York, to Irish parents and is an All-Ireland champion on the flute and whistle. She became the first American to win the senior all-Ireland championship on the tin whistle in 1984. Since 1985, she has been the central force behind Cherish the Ladies, driving them to international acclaim. The group has been a launchpad for many of the top female musicians in Celtic music, including Eileen Ivers, Winifred Horan of Solas, Cathie Ryan Heidi Talbot, Liz Knowles, Aoife Clancy, and Deirdre Connolly.

Over the course of the past thirty-nine years, the band have performed in North and South America, the UK, Europe, New Zealand and Australia. Their shows are always accompanied by step dancers on stage.

They have recorded many albums, but their album The Girls Won't Leave the Boys Alone stands apart from their other albums in that it consists mostly of songs and includes guest appearances by Arlo Guthrie, Tom Chapin, Pete Seeger, Eric Weissberg, Matt Molloy, and The Clancy Brothers. Cherish the Ladies has also recorded a track on the Grammy-nominated album, The Celtic Album with the Boston Pops.

Although the group was originally formed from Irish-American female musicians, the current lineup, along with Madden, consists of founding member Mary Coogan (from New York) on guitar, All-Ireland Champion Mirella Murray from Connemara, County Galway, on piano accordion; pianist Kathleen Boyle from Glasgow, Scotland; fiddler Nollaig Casey from Bandon, County Cork, and Kate Purcell from County Clare on vocals.

== Discography ==
- Cherish the Ladies: Irish Women Musicians in America (1985)
- Fathers and Daughters from Cherish the Ladies: Irish Traditional Music in America (LP only, 1985)
- The Back Door (1992)
- Out and About (1993)
- New Day Dawning (1996)
- Live! (1997)
- One and All: The Best of Cherish the Ladies (1998)
- Threads of Time (1998)
- At Home (1999)
- The Girls Won't Leave the Boys Alone (2001)
- Across the Waves (2004)
- On Christmas Night (2004)
- Woman of the House (2005)
- A Star in the East (2009)
- Country Crossroads (2011)
- An Irish Homecoming, Live from Bucknell (2013)
- Christmas in Ireland (2015)
- Heart of the Home (2018)
