= Patrick Clifford (musician) =

American musician, songwriter, and producer of Irish and folk music (born 1966)

- Born: Patrick Clifford; 27 July 1966 (age 60); New York, New York, United States
- Genres: World, Irish, Celtic, folk, Irish folk
- Occupations: Musician; Songwriter; Producer
- Instruments: Vocals, guitar, bass, piano, harmonica, keyboards
- Years active: 1991–present
- Label: Irish Side
- Formerly of: Four to the Bar
- Website: www.patrickclifford.com

Patrick Clifford (born in New York City, 1966) is a musician, songwriter, and producer of Irish and folk music. He is best known as a key member of Four to the Bar—a "well loved and well respected" mainstay of the 1990s New York Irish music scene—he has also released two solo albums: American Wake and Chance of a Start.

Clifford grew up in Washington Heights, Manhattan. Like many contemporary New York Irish musicians, he received his earliest training from the renowned Martin Mulvihill, (on piano accordion). His primary instrument with Four to the Bar was the bass, but he also added piano, guitar, and accordion to the band's sound, on both stage and recordings.

As a songwriter, he wrote two tracks for the band's watershed album, Another Son:

- "The Western Shore" and
- "The Old Men Admiring Themselves in the Water" (music only).

He and guitarist Martin Kelleher are generally credited with the production of both of Four to the Bar's full-length albums; Another Son is notable for its elegance and Craic on the Road for its energy and atmosphere.

In 1993, he produced Sky in My Hand, the first release by New York folk singer/songwriter Liz Dacey. This recording was engineered by Virgil Moorefield.

In 2008, he recorded, mixed, and mastered To the Fray, an album by the band Hobnail. He also played bass and sang on this release.

== Discography ==
- Sky in My Hand (Producer for Liz Dacey) (1993)
- Four to the Bar (EP) (with Four to the Bar) (1993)
- Craic on the Road (with Four to the Bar) (1994)
- Another Son (with Four to the Bar) (1995)
- To the Fray (with Hobnail) (2008)
- American Wake (2010)
- Chance of a Start (2012)
