= Joanie Madden =

Irish-American flute and whistle player of Irish traditional music (born 1965?)

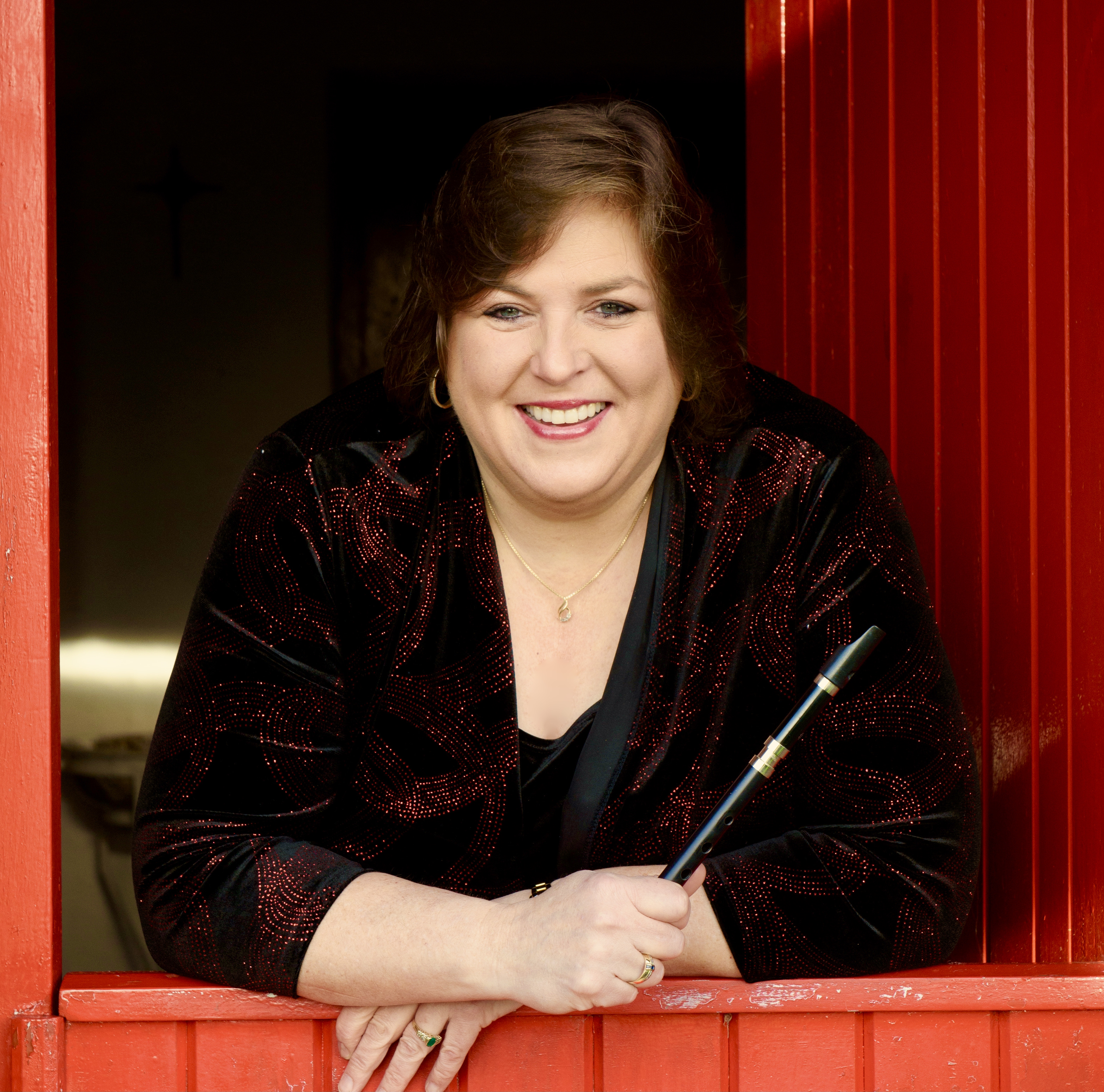
Madden in 2018

Joanie Madden is an Irish-American flute and whistle player of Irish traditional music. She is best known as leader of the all-female group Cherish the Ladies, but has also recorded and performed with numerous other musicians, and as a solo artist. She also teaches master classes and workshops.

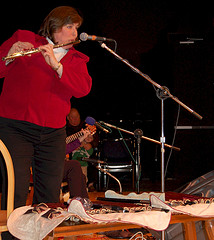
Madden playing the flute at the Coatesville Traditional Irish Music Series in Coatesville, Pennsylvania

== Biography ==
Madden was born in the Bronx to Irish immigrants. Her father, Joe, was an All-Ireland Champion on the accordion and a well known and respected Irish musician who was inducted into the Comhaltas Ceoltóirí Éireann Mid-Atlantic Region Hall of Fame in 1992. As a young child, Madden started her journey as a musician by taking some lessons on the fiddle and piano, but the instruments didn't hold her interest. She eventually became enamored with the tin whistle, and paid for her own lessons with neighbor and National Heritage Award Winner, Jack Coen. As a teenager and young adult, she gained experience playing with her father's band, and with classmate Eileen Ivers. In 1983, at the age of 18, she won the All-Ireland Championship on both the flute and tin whistle, and in 1984 she travelled back to Ireland to compete once again and became the first American to win the Senior All-Ireland Championship for tin whistle. Shortly after, Mick Moloney contacted her about performing, emceeing and helping him organize a concert series featuring women musicians. Joanie suggested the title; "Cherish the Ladies" as the name of the concert series and this developed into the Internationally renowned band by the same name, which Joanie has headed since its inception. Since then, she has performed and recorded on over 200 albums and is in constant demand as a soloist and recording artist. While the majority of her work is within the Irish tradition, she has also played on film scores and with artists of varied styles such as Sinéad O'Connor and Pete Seeger, Don Henley, Luka Bloom, Sharon Shannon, Lunasa, Kathy Mattea, Eileen Ivers, Vince Gill, Arlo Guthrie, Tom Chapin, Paddy Reilly, Eric Weissberg, Matt Molloy, Tommy Makem, The Clancy Brothers, The Boston Pops and many more. She has recorded three solo albums; her solo album Song of the Irish Whistle is the most successful whistle album ever recorded in history, selling hundreds of thousands of units. On February 17, 2007, Madden followed in her father's footsteps and was honored when she was inducted into the Comhaltas Ceoltóirí Éireann Mid-Atlantic Region Hall of Fame.

== Choice of instrument ==
Madden's choice of flute is rare in Irish traditional music as she plays a Boehm-system flute (sometimes referred to as a "classical" or "silver" flute). The majority of flute players in traditional Irish music play simple-system wooden flutes. The classical flute is not a natural choice of instrument for this style of music, since it is difficult to perform certain ornamentation, for example slides are impossible on a beginner's instrument without ring keys, and different strategies are needed for other types of ornamentation. Madden has broken down these barriers and has been singled out by some of the leading lights in the flute world; Matt Molloy of The Chieftains and James Galway have both remarked that Madden is one of the best flutists in Irish music today.

== Awards and honors ==
In 2011, Madden received the Ellis Island Medal of Honor in recognition of her artistry and her support of Irish-American music and culture. She also had a street named after her on the Grand Concourse in her native Bronx; Joanie Madden and Cherish the Ladies.

In 2012, Madden was named a Fellow of United States Artists.

She is a recipient of a 2021 National Heritage Fellowship awarded by the National Endowment for the Arts, which is the United States government's highest honor in the folk and traditional arts.

== Partial discography ==
=== Cherish the Ladies ===
- see discography on the Cherish the Ladies page

=== As a solo artist ===
- Whistle on the Wind (1994)
- Song of the Irish Whistle (Hearts of Space Records, 1996)
- Song of the Irish Whistle 2 (Hearts of Space Records, 1999)

=== Pride of New York ===
- Pride of New York (2009)

=== As a guest artist ===
- Sinéad O'Connor – Am I Not Your Girl? (1992); Sean-Nós_Nua (2002)
- Rockapella – Where in the World Is Carmen Sandiego? (1992)
- John Boswell – Count Me In (1993)
- Hearts of Space (label compilation) – Celtic Twilight (1994)
- Nóirín Ní Riain – Celtic Soul (1996)
- Pete Seeger – Pete (1996)
- The Boston Pops – Celtic Album (1998)
- Black 47 – Bittersweet Sixteen (2006)
- Brian Keane – Copper: Original Soundtrack (2013)
- Liz Madden - Legacy (2015)
