= Four to the Bar =

American band

- O'Neill, Kelleher, Yeates, Clifford

Background information
- Also known as: 4 to the Bar
- Origin: New York City, US
- Genres: Celtic; Folk rock Celtic fusion Folk
- Years active: 1991–1996
- Labels: Independent
- Website: http://www.FourToTheBar.com

Four to the Bar was an American band from New York City during the early to mid-1990s.

== Band history ==
=== The Early Days: 1991–1992 ===
Four to the Bar was formed in the working-class immigrant Irish community of Woodside, Queens, New York City, in 1991. The initial lineup was Martin Kelleher (from Cork) on bass guitar, David Yeates (from Dunboyne, County Meath) on vocals and flute, David Livingstone (from County Monaghan) on mandolin, and Gerry Singleton on guitar.

That August, Kelleher switched to guitar and the band placed a classified ad for a bass player in the Irish Voice newspaper. Patrick Clifford (from New York City) answered the ad, was hired, and completed the Kelleher-Yeates-Clifford nucleus that would hold for the remainder of the band's existence.

Four to the Bar immediately began to tour regionally. It was during this time that the band gave an opening act for then-rising star Sharon Shannon at the Bog in Jamaica Plain, which brought attention.

In 1992, Livingstone abruptly left the band and returned to Ireland. For a number of months, the lead-instrument slot was filled by various fiddlers and mandolin players, most notably Chris Murphy and John Farrell (later of the Prodigals and Fathom).

=== The Heydays: 1993–1994 ===
In October 1992, Four to the Bar found and retained fiddler Keith O'Neill.

Soon after this, the band completed its first commercial recording, a four-song EP and titled simply Four to the Bar (1993). This was available only on cassette.

During the next 12 months, the band would begin to build its name in New York, sharing the marquee with acts as diverse as Frank Patterson and Susan McKeown's Chanting House, and begin to test the bounds of the trad repertoire with such covers as Phil Ochs' "I Ain't Marching Anymore." Four to the Bar headlined regularly at Tommy Makem's Irish Pavilion and Paddy Reilly's Music Bar, and on one occasion served as Pete Seeger's backing band.

Sometime between February and April 1994, Four to the Bar spent time in a Manhattan studio working with a number of fellow musicians, including Seamus Egan, Eileen Ivers, Larry Campbell, Matt Keating, Steve Holley, and Rufus Cappadocia.

This project was never commercially released; rough mixes from these sessions apparently circulated as bootlegs through the community, but little else is known about the project.

Around the same time, Four to the Bar was experimenting with its sound—by adding to the lineup, together and separately, accordionist Tony McQuillan and percussionist Seamus Casey. While neither would prove permanent, they both appear on Craic on the Road, the band's first CD release, recorded live on June 16, 1994 and released later that year.

=== The Final Days: 1995–1996 ===
In early 1995, Four to the Bar bought and borrowed recording equipment, called in engineer Tim Hatfield, and converted a rented dancehall into a recording studio. The five men worked in isolation for three weeks recording, mixing, and mastering, and emerged with Another Son (1995).

On the strength of the recording, the band was chosen to perform at the 1995 Daytona International Music Festival, sharing the bill with Trisha Yearwood and the London Symphony Orchestra. The subsequent promotional tour carried the band from Vermont to Key West to St. Louis to Chicago.

At some point later that same year, O'Neill resigned; his spot was filled by a series of local freelancers, including Monty Monaghan, Tony DeMarco, John Reynolds, and Joyce Andersen. Classically trained, Andersen brought a cultured sound, but was focused on a solo career and her tenure was brief.

On New Year's Eve 1995, Four to the Bar had just started its first set in Dillon's Pub in hometown Woodside, NY, when a fire broke out in an adjoining diner. Each musician managed to save his instrument, but everything else was destroyed. Four to the Bar never fully recovered from the disaster, and despite playing a handful of shows in early 1996, this setback effectively signalled the band's demise.

== Discography ==
- Four to the Bar (EP) (1993)
- Craic on the Road (1994)
- Another Son (1995)

== Members ==
- David Yeates: Vocals, bodhran, flute, tin whistle, percussion, guitar
- Martin Kelleher: Lead and backing vocals, guitar, bouzouki, five-string banjo, mandolin
- Patrick Clifford: Bass guitar, piano, electric guitar, accordion
- Keith O'Neill: Fiddle, tenor banjo

=== Transitional Members ===
- Joyce Andersen
- Seamus Casey
- John Farrell
- David Livingstone
- Tony McQuillan
- Monty Monaghan
- Chris Murphy
- John Reynolds
