= A Spontaneous Performance Recording =

Live album by The Clancy Brothers and Tommy Makem
- Released: August 1961
- Recorded: 5 March 1961
- Genre: Irish folk music
- Length: 30:45
- Label: Columbia; CL 1648 (mono); CS 8448 (stereo)
- Producer: Bob Morgan

The Clancy Brothers and Tommy Makem chronology
The Clancy Brothers & Tommy Makem (1961)	A Spontaneous Performance Recording (1961)	Hearty and Hellish! (1962)

Singles from A Spontaneous Performance Recording
- 1. "The Moonshiner"/"The Whistling Gypsy"; 2. "Tim Finnegan's Wake"/"Reilly's Daughter"

Professional ratings
Review scores
Source	Rating
Allmusic	link
Billboard	4/5 stars

A Spontaneous Performance Recording!: The Clancy Brothers and Tommy Makem, sometimes simply called A Spontaneous Performance, is a 1961 collection of traditional Irish folk songs performed by The Clancy Brothers with frequent collaborator Tommy Makem. It was their first album for Columbia Records. The group would continue to record for Columbia for the remainder of the 1960s. The album was nominated for a Grammy Award in 1962 for Best Folk Recording.

The LP had originally been considered a self-titled album with "A Spontaneous Performance Recording!" merely a description of the record for the cover. It is referred to as The Clancy Brothers and Tommy Makem in the original reviews of the album and for its Grammy Nomination. It later became known as A Spontaneous Performance Recording to avoid confusion, because the group already had released a less popular album entitled The Clancy Brothers and Tommy Makem on the little Tradition Records label that Paddy Clancy ran.

One of the leaders of the American folk music revival, Pete Seeger, played the banjo on the recording. In 2007 on the BBC, influential folk singer and songwriter Christy Moore chose the song, "Brennan on the Moor," from this album as one of his desert island discs. He introduced the song by noting, "The Clancy Brothers changed my life," because through them he discovered a love for Irish folk music.

== Reception ==
A review in Variety praised the album's style as "exciting because it isn't yet overdone." It also lauded the "lively" musical accompaniment of Seeger and Bruce Langhorne and the singing of the live audience on the album. Even though the reviewer noted that the Clancy Brothers and Tommy Makem were only starting to get prominent live gigs at that point, he said already "the group was built along solid pro lines."

The Billboard Magazine review rated the album with four stars and noted its "strong sales potential." After referring to the Clancy Brothers and Tommy Makem as an "Irish Brothers Four or Kingston Trio," the article praised the group's "delightfully droll manner" and "spirited interpretations" on the recording.

The New York Times lauded the album for its "vigor and drive and charm," but also criticized an apparent speeding up of the recording that "distorts the group's natural sound" and made the singers sound too much like American pop groups.

In a more specialized review of folk albums, D. K. Wilgus argued that this record "demonstrates that general respect for tradition may survive in a stage concert for a major label." He also expressed the opinion that A Spontaneous Performance was at about the same level as the Clancy Brothers and Tommy Makem's self-titled album on Tradition Records that was released earlier the same year.

== Other releases and reissues ==
In 1961, side one of A Spontaneous Performance Recording was released as an EP, The Moonshiner. Side two was also released in EP format as Tim Finnegan's Wake.

In 2009, Sony Legacy reissued the entire album in mp3 format for download. In 2012 Jasmine Music re-released A Spontaneous Performance as part of the four-album collection on two CDs, Raise a Glass to the Sounds of...The Clancy Brothers & Tommy Makem, which also included the albums, The Rising of the Moon, Come Fill Your Glass with Us, and The Clancy Brothers and Tommy Makem. In addition, selections from the album were released on CD as part of The Clancy Brothers Collection 1956-1962 in late 2013. This compilation also includes the Clancy Brothers and Tommy Makem's second Columbia record, The Boys Won't Leave the Girls Alone, as well as the group's earlier Tradition Records albums.

Several songs from this album have appeared on various Clancy Brothers compilation recordings.

== Track listing ==
All songs are traditional and were adapted and arranged by The Clancy Brothers and Tommy Makem, except "A Jug of Punch" and The Whistling Gypsy, written by Leo Maguire

Side one
No.	Title	Lead vocals	Length
1.	"The Moonshiner"	Tom Clancy	2:37
2.	"The Whistling Gypsy"	Tommy Makem	3:51
3.	"My Johnny Lad"	Paddy Clancy	1:59
4.	"The Work of the Weavers"	Liam Clancy	2:23
5.	"The Old Orange Flute"	Tommy Makem	3:05
6.	"Brennan on the Moor"	Tommy Makem and Tom Clancy	2:32

Side two
No.	Title	Writer(s)	Lead vocals	Length
1.	"Tim Finnegan's Wake"		Tommy Makem	2:05
2.	"Port Lairge"		Liam Clancy	2:37
3.	"Haul Away Joe"		Tom Clancy	2:07
4.	"Young Roddy McCorley"		No solos	2:32
5.	"A Jug of Punch"	Francis McPeake - arranged by P. Kennedy	Paddy Clancy	3:15
6.	"Reilly's Daughter"		Tommy Makem	1:42

== Personnel ==
- Paddy Clancy - vocals, harmonica
- Tom Clancy - vocals
- Liam Clancy - vocals, guitar
- Tommy Makem - vocals, tin whistle
- Pete Seeger - banjo
- Bruce Langhorne - guitar
