= In Person at Carnegie Hall =

Live album by The Clancy Brothers and Tommy Makem
- Released: November 1963 (original LP); 17 February 2009 (Legacy)
- Recorded: 17 March 1963; 3 November 1962 (2 songs)
- Venues: Carnegie Hall, New York, NY
- Genre: Irish folk music
- Length: 36:35 (Columbia); 01:52:55 (Sony Legacy)
- Labels: Columbia; CL 1950 (mono); CS 8750 (stereo); Columbia 8750 CD (original CD); Legacy 42571 2 CD (complete concert)
- Producers: Harold Leventhal (concert); Robert Morgan (original album); Jerry Rappaport (Legacy Edition)

The Clancy Brothers and Tommy Makem chronology
The Boys Won't Leave The Girls Alone (1962)	In Person at Carnegie Hall (1963)	The First Hurrah! (1964)

Professional ratings
Review scores
Source	Rating
Allmusic	(original)
Allmusic	(complete concert)

In Person at Carnegie Hall was the seminal Irish folk group The Clancy Brothers and Tommy Makem's most successful album. It was recorded in Carnegie Hall on 17 March 1963 at their annual St. Patrick's Day concert. In the documentary, The Story of the Clancy Brothers and Tommy Makem, Paddy Clancy said that this was the best album the group recorded. The album spent months on the American Top LPs chart and broke the top fifty albums in December 1963, an unprecedented occurrence for an Irish folk music recording at that time. It has never been out of print since its initial release.

Two songs on the album, "The Juice of the Barley" and "Oro Se Do Bheatha Bhaile," were recorded during their previous Carnegie Hall concert from 3 November 1962. When it was first released in late 1963, only around a third of the concert appeared on the record. In 2009, the Legacy Edition was released, which contained the complete recording of the concert including banter and song introductions. Princeton University professor of history, Sean Wilentz, wrote the liner notes for the new release.

== Reception ==
The reviewer for Billboard chose the album as "A Billboard Pick" and referred to it as a "fine" recording with "a number of good outings." The review singled out the "Children's Medley" and the poem, "O'Driscoll", for showing another side of the group. The magazine also recommended the song "Patriot Game" for disk jockeys to play for their audiences.

The album sold well over the long term, becoming the best-selling record released by the Clancy Brothers. In January 1966, almost two and a half years after the album's release, Columbia selected the recording as one of their "best catalog sellers...that every dealer should carry." Although not released until 1965 in Australia, Billboard noted that the album was "chalking up big sales" there.

== Track listing ==
=== Side one ===
1. "Johnson's Motor Car"
2. "The Juice of the Barley"
3. "O'Driscoll (The Host of the Air)" [A poem recited by Tom Clancy]
4. "Reilly's Daughter"
5. "The Patriot Game"
6. "Legion of the Rearguard"
7. "Oro Se Do Bheatha Bhaile"

=== Side two ===
1. "A Jug of Punch"
2. "Galway Bay"
3. "Children's Medley": When I Was Young; Shellicky Bookey; Big Ship Sailing; Ahem! Ahem!; Wallflowers; Mary the Money; Frosty Weather; Man of Double Deed; The Wren Song; Up the Long Ladder; Some Say the Divil's Dead; The Irish Soldiers; Up the Long Ladder
4. "The Parting Glass"

== Legacy Edition ==
In the legacy edition, the full concert including dialogues can be listened to. Also, the two songs recorded in 1962 were included in this edition.

=== Disc One ===
1. "Bold O'Donahue"
2. "My Johnny Lad"
3. "The Shoals of Herring"
4. "Haulin' the Bowline"
5. "Irish Rover"
6. "Mr. Moses Re-Tooral-I Ay"
7. "Marie's Wedding"
8. "The Moonshiner"
9. "The Patriot Game"
10. "Kelly, The Boy From Killane"
11. "Johnson's Motor Car"
12. "The West's Awake"
13. "Medley: O'Driscoll, The King of the Fairies, Eileen Aroon"
14. "Reilly's Daughter"

=== Disc Two ===
1. "Children's Medley": When I Was Young; Shellicky Bookey; Big Ship Sailing; Ahem! Ahem!; Wallflowers; Mary the Money; Frosty Weather; Man of Double Deed; The Wren Song; Up the Long Ladder; Some Say the Devil's Dead; The Irish Soldiers; Up the Long Ladder
2. "Legion of the Rearguard"
3. "Haul Away Joe"
4. "Bonnie Prince Charlie"
5. "Galway Bay"
6. "The Wild Colonial Boy"
7. "The Cobbler"
8. "The Jolly Tinker"
9. "A Jug of Punch"
10. "Brennan on the Moor"
11. "The Whistling Gypsy"
12. "Port Lairge"
13. "The Parting Glass"
14. "The Juice of the Barley"
15. "Oro Se Do Bheatha Bhaile"

== Personnel ==
- Liam Clancy - vocals, guitar
- Paddy Clancy - vocals
- Tom Clancy - vocals
- Tommy Makem - vocals, banjo and tin whistle
- Bruce Langhorne - guitar (on "The Juice of the Barley" and "Oro se do Bheatha Bhaile")
- Bill Lee - bass (on "The Juice of the Barley" and "Oro se do Bheatha Bhaile")

Since Paddy did not bring his harmonica for the concert, the sound of harmonica is not heard in this album.

== Chart position ==
In Person at Carnegie Hall spent twelve weeks on Billboard Magazine's list of the top 150 full-length albums of all genres released in the United States. The album debuted on the chart on 16 November 1963 at #145 and began to rise in the weeks thereafter. In December, the album jumped from #106 to #50, its highest position on the chart. After 21 December the album began to fall, reviving briefly in late January 1964, when it again broke the top 100. It left the charts in early February.

Year	Chart	Position
1963	Billboard Top LPs	50
