= The Boys Won't Leave the Girls Alone =

Studio album by The Clancy Brothers and Tommy Makem
- Released: November 1962
- Recorded: 19 April, 25 & 28 June and 16 July 1962; New York, NY
- Genre: Irish folk
- Length: 33:30
- Labels: Columbia; CL 1909 LP (mono); CS 8709 LP (stereo)
- Producer: Robert Morgan

The Clancy Brothers and Tommy Makem chronology
Hearty and Hellish! (1962)	The Boys Won't Leave the Girls Alone (1962)	In Person at Carnegie Hall (1963)

The Boys Won't Leave the Girls Alone is a collection of mostly traditional Irish folk songs performed by The Clancy Brothers and Tommy Makem. It also includes several songs from other countries, such as the Scottish folk song, "Marie's Wedding". It was their third album for Columbia Records and was released in 1962. It was also their first studio album for the label. Its title is taken from the song, "I'll Tell My Ma". The original LP featured liner notes by Tom Clancy.

== Reception ==
A review in Variety praised the group's "bounce and drive" and the "listening excitement" that they created on the album. The article suggested that The Boys Won't Leave the Girls Alone had enough novelty and variety to provide folk music fans with something different.

Billboard Magazine included the album in its "National Breakouts" list in May and June 1963. It was considered a "New Action LP," which the magazine described as "new albums, not yet on Billboard's Top LP's Chart, [that] have been reported getting strong sales action by dealers in major markets."

== Other releases and reissues ==
In 1963, The Boys Won't Leave the Girls Alone was released on two EP records entitled, The Clancy Brothers & Tommy Makem No. 1 and The Clancy Brothers & Tommy Makem No. 2.

The album was reissued in the United Kingdom in 1984 (CBS 32504 LP) and in the United States in 1987 (Shanachie 52015 LP). Shanachie Records released it on CD in 1993.

On 3 January 2013 the album became available in mp3 format for the first time in the United Kingdom. Later that same month the Country Music Group released the mp3 album, O'Donahue, in the United States for digital download only. The album contained the entirety of The Boys Won't Leave the Girls Alone with the tracks in a different order.

All the songs from the album were released on CD as part of The Clancy Brothers Collection 1956-1962 in late 2013. This compilation also includes selections from the Clancy Brothers and Tommy Makem's first Columbia record, A Spontaneous Performance Recording, as well as the group's earlier Tradition Records albums, The Rising of the Moon, Come Fill Your Glass with Us, and The Clancy Brothers and Tommy Makem.

== Track listing ==
All songs traditional except as indicated.

=== Side one ===
1. "Bold O'Donahue" - 1:43
2. "I'll Tell My Ma" – 1:38
3. "Will Ye Go, Lassie, Go?" (Francis McPeake) - 3:06
4. "Rothsea-O" – 2:21
5. "Marie's Wedding" (Hugh Roberton) - 2:00
6. "Singin' Bird" (F. McPeake) - 3:01
7. "Holy Ground" – 2:29

=== Side two ===
1. "South Australia" – 2:00
2. "As I Roved Out" – 2:13
3. "McPherson's Lament" – 3:33
4. "The Wild Colonial Boy" – 2:55
5. "The Shoals of Herring" (Ewan MacColl) - 2:33
6. "I Know Who Is Sick" – 1:23
7. "Old Woman from Wexford" – 1:58

== Personnel ==
- Liam Clancy - vocals, guitar
- Pat Clancy - vocals, harmonica
- Tom Clancy - vocals
- Tommy Makem - vocals, banjo, tin whistle
- Bruce Langhorne - guitar
- Robert Morgan - bass
- Eric Weissberg - banjo (on "Rothsea-O" and "South Australia")
- John Stauber - guitar (on "Rothsea-O" and "South Australia")
- Bill Lee - bass (on "Rothsea-O" and "South Australia")
