= Ain't It Grand Boys =

Live album by The Clancy Brothers and Tommy Makem
- Released: Feb 28, 1995
- Recorded: March 5, 1961 – November 5, 1966
- Genre: Irish folk
- Length: 1:39:47
- Label: Columbia/Sony Legacy

Professional ratings
Review scores
Source	Rating
Allmusic	positive
Entertainment Weekly	A

Ain't It Grand Boys: A Collection of Unissued Gems is a 1995 two-disc compilation of previously unreleased recordings by the Clancy Brothers and Tommy Makem. All the tracks were taken from various live performances from the early to mid-1960s.

One of the leaders of the American folk music revival, Pete Seeger, played the banjo on six of the tracks on the album, including "This Land Is Your Land," for which he also sings the lead.

== Reception ==
Entertainment Weekly critic, Bob Cannon, lauded the album for "bristling with wit and passion." The reviewer for All Music praised the songs on the album as some of the Clancy Brothers and Tommy Makem's "most spirited on record."

== Track listing ==
The songs were adapted and arranged by the Clancy Brothers and Tommy Makem.

Disc one
No.	Title	Lead vocals	Length
1.	"American Medley: Kings Highway/Rock Island Line"	Each singer has solos	3:21
2.	"Jesse James"	Liam Clancy	1:02
3.	"Old Man Came Courting"	Liam Clancy	2:23
4.	"The West's Awake"	Tommy Makem	3:22
5.	"Royal Canal"	Liam Clancy	4:55
6.	"The Rising Of The Moon"	Tom Clancy	2:20
7.	"The Gallant Forty Twa"	Liam Clancy	3:02
8.	"Jolly Plough Boy"	Liam Clancy	3:04
9.	"Courtin' in the Kitchen"	Tommy Makem	3:20
10.	"Isn't It Grand Boys"	Each singer has a solo verse	4:38
11.	"When We Were Under The King"	Tommy Makem	2:25
12.	"Whiskey Is The Life Of Man"	Tom Clancy	3:14
13.	"Love Is Kind"	Liam Clancy	2:35
14.	"The Holy Ground"	No solos	2:15
15.	"Carol Of The Birds"	Paddy Clancy	3:15
16.	"The Little Beggerman"	Tommy Makem	2:45

Disc two
No.	Title	Lead vocals	Length
1.	"Children's Medley"	Each singer has solos and dialogue	8:20
2.	"Mountain Dew"	Paddy Clancy	2:08
3.	"Port Lairge"	No solos	3:14
4.	"Rosin the Bow"	Paddy Clancy	2:44
5.	"Johnny McEldoo"	No solos	2:16
6.	"Ballinderry"	Tommy Makem	3:30
7.	"Young Roddy McCorley"	No solos	3:06
8.	"Marie's Wedding"	Liam Clancy	2:44
9.	"Mr. Moses Ri-Tooral-I-Ay"	Paddy Clancy	4:07
10.	"The Irish Rover"	Tommy Makem	2:46
11.	"The 23rd Of June"	Each singer has a solo verse	2:16
12.	"As I Roved Out"	Tommy Makem	1:11
13.	"Johnson's Motor Car"	Each singer has a solo verse	2:06
14.	"The Patriot Game"	Liam Clancy	4:11
15.	"Lord Nelson"	Tommy Makem	3:35
16.	"This Land Is Your Land"	Pete Seeger	3:18

== Personnel ==
- Paddy Clancy - vocals, harmonica
- Tom Clancy - vocals
- Liam Clancy - vocals, guitar
- Tommy Makem - vocals, banjo, tin whistle
- Pete Seeger - vocals, banjo
- Bruce Langhorne - guitar
