= Hearty and Hellish! =

Live album by The Clancy Brothers and Tommy Makem
- Released: 12 February 1962
- Recorded: 10–18 November 1961; Chicago, Illinois
- Genre: Irish folk music
- Length: 38:23
- Label: Columbia
- Producer: Bob Morgan

The Clancy Brothers and Tommy Makem chronology
A Spontaneous Performance Recording (1961)	Hearty and Hellish! (1962)	The Boys Won't Leave the Girls Alone (1962)

Singles from Hearty and Hellish!
- 1. "Brennan on the Moor [Non-album cut]"/"Irish Rover"; 2. "Young Cassidy [Non-album cut]"/"The Rising of the Moon"; 3. "Irish Rover"/"Courtin' in the Kitchen"; 4. "Jug of This"/"Johnny McEldoo"; 5. "Whiskey, You're the Devil"/"Mountain Dew"; 6. "When I Was Single"/"God Bless England"; 7. "The Rising of the Moon"/"Mr. Moses Ri-tooral-i-ay"

Professional ratings
Review scores
Source	Rating
Allmusic	link

Hearty and Hellish! is a live album of traditional Irish folk songs performed by the Clancy Brothers and Tommy Makem, recorded live at the Gate of Horn in Chicago. It was their second album for Columbia Records. In a January 1963 article, Time magazine selected Hearty and Hellish! as one of the top 10 albums of 1962.

Shanachie Records released the album on CD in 1993. It was reissued in 2009 in mp3 only format.

== Reception ==
Robert Shelton, writing in The New York Times, favorably compared album to the group's Grammy-nominated first Columbia record, A Spontaneous Performance Recording. He considered Hearty and Hellish! to be "much more representative of these gifted performers", and he especially praised the number, "The 23rd of June", from the album.

== Track listing ==
=== Side one ===
1. "Irish Rover"
2. "The Barnyards of Delgaty"
3. "October Winds" (a.k.a. "The Castle of Dromore")
4. "Courtin' in the Kitchen"
5. "The Jolly Tinker"
6. "Jug of This"
7. "Johnny McEldoo"
8. "Whiskey, You're the Devil"

=== Side two ===
1. "Mountain Dew"
2. "When I Was Single"
3. "The 23rd of June"
4. "The Rising of the Moon"
5. "God Bless England"
6. "Mr. Moses Ri-tooral-i-ay"
7. "Johnny, I Hardly Knew Ye"

== Personnel ==
- Paddy Clancy - vocals, harmonica
- Tom Clancy - vocals
- Liam Clancy - vocals, guitar
- Tommy Makem - vocals, tin whistle
- Bruce Langhorne - guitar
- Frank Hamilton - banjo
- Herb Brown - bass
