= The Rising of the Moon (album) =

The Rising of the Moon: Irish Songs of Rebellion
- The cover of a reissue of The Rising of the Moon with the group name at top

Studio album by The Clancy Brothers and Tommy Makem
- Released: 1956 (original album); 1959 (re-recorded album)
- Genre: Irish folk music
- Length: 33:38
- Label: Tradition

The Clancy Brothers and Tommy Makem chronology
The Rising of the Moon: Irish Songs of Rebellion (1956)	Come Fill Your Glass with Us (1959)

Professional ratings
Review scores
Source	Rating
Allmusic	link

The Rising of the Moon: Irish Songs of Rebellion is a collection of traditional Irish folk songs performed by The Clancy Brothers and Tommy Makem. It was the group's first album and was initially recorded in 1956. For the original recording, the only instrument used was Paddy Clancy's harmonica, since Tommy Makem had damaged his hand and Liam Clancy was still learning how to play the guitar. The group had yet to develop its distinctive musical sound, so there was little ensemble singing.

In 1959, the Clancy Brothers and Tommy Makem re-recorded the album with different arrangements. For this new version, they brought in backup musicians on guitar and harp, and Tommy Makem played the whistle and drums. Both editions of The Rising of the Moon were released by Tradition Records, the Clancy Brothers' home label run by eldest brother Paddy Clancy, who also wrote the liner notes for the album. The Rising of the Moon has been reissued on LP, cassette, CD, and digital download on several occasions.

The cover, depicting a white shirt bloodied by a wound to the heart under the rising moon was designed by Louis le Brocquy.

== Reception ==
In his review of the original 1956 album, New York Times music critic Robert Shelton wrote that the quality of the album was "somewhat uneven," but praised the "virile singing" of the group. He picked out "O Donnell Aboo," "Rising of the Moon," and "Kelly the Boy from Killane" as the best numbers on the album, which offered, in his words, "a capsule history of the Irish struggle for freedom."

== Reissues ==
The second version of the album was reissued under the same name in 1998 for the 200th-anniversary celebrations of the Irish Rebellion of 1798. All the tracks from the 1959 edition appear on this CD.

The original 1956 version of the album has never been reissued. The first track, "O Donnell Aboo" (an apostrophe was not initially included in the title name) with harmonica accompaniment, is the only song to have been re-released from this version. It is now more commonly reproduced on compilation albums and reissues than the 1959 version with Irish harp and snare drum. It appears on the 2006 album, 28 Irish Pub Songs. Besides the initial track, all the rest of the songs on the album from The Rising of the Moon are taken from the 1959 version. The CD also contains the group's follow-up album, Come Fill Your Glass with Us. The album (with the original "O Donnell Aboo" only) was once more released with Come Fill Your Glass with Us in 2009 on a single CD, entitled Irish Songs of Drinking and Rebellion. The 1956 track and rest of the 1959 record also appears on the 2012 double CD, Raise a Glass to the Sounds of...The Clancy Brothers & Tommy Makem. These albums are also available for digital download.

In late 2013 the album was released on CD with the original "O Donnell Aboo" as part of The Clancy Brothers Collection 1956-1962. This compilation also includes the group's later Tradition Records albums, Come Fill Your Glass with Us and The Clancy Brothers and Tommy Makem, and their third Columbia album, The Boys Won't Leave the Girls Alone, as well as selections from the group's first Columbia record, A Spontaneous Performance Recording.

== Track listing ==
The songs and lead vocalists are the same for both versions of the album. Track lengths are based on the 1959 edition. All songs are traditional.

Side one
No.	Title	Lead vocals	Length
1.	"O'Donnell Aboo"	No solos	1:43
2.	"The Croppy Boy"	Liam Clancy	2:37
3.	"The Rising of the Moon"	Tom Clancy	2:27
4.	"The Foggy Dew"	Paddy Clancy	3:32
5.	"The Minstrel Boy"	Liam Clancy	1:38
6.	"The Wind that Shakes the Barley"	Tommy Makem	3:09
7.	"Tipperary Far Away"	Tom Clancy	1:52

Side two
No.	Title	Lead vocals	Length
1.	"Kelly the Boy from Killanne"	Liam Clancy	2:34
2.	"Kevin Barry"	Tom Clancy	2:20
3.	"Whack Fol the Diddle"	Liam Clancy	2:17
4.	"The Men of the West"	Tommy Makem	1:52
5.	"Eamonn an Chnoic"	Liam Clancy	2:33
6.	"Nell Flaherty's Drake"	Tommy Makem	2:40
7.	"Boulavogue"	Paddy Clancy	2:36

== Personnel (1956 edition) ==
- Patrick Clancy - vocals, harmonica
- Tom Clancy - vocals
- Liam Clancy - vocals
- Tommy Makem - vocals

== Personnel (1959 edition) ==
- Patrick Clancy - vocals, harmonica
- Tom Clancy - vocals
- Liam Clancy - vocals
- Tommy Makem - vocals, tin whistle, drum
- Jack Keenan - guitar
- Jack Melady - Irish harp

The 1961 and later reissues of the album include the group name, The Clancy Brothers and Tommy Makem, on the front cover. The original 1956 and 1959 versions of the album had simply listed their individual names.
