= The Water Is Wide (Órla Fallon album) =

The Water is Wide is the debut album of Irish singer Órla Fallon.

Most of the album was recorded and mixed at The Mill Studio in Swords, Co, Dublin, Ireland in July 2000 and was published by Liffey Music. The song "Siúil a Rún" was recorded in December 1999 and published by Bardis Music.

It was released in 2000 in Europe under the label Celtic Collections then released in North America as Celtic Woman Presents: Orlà - The Water Is Wide in 2006 under the label Manhattan. The album peaked at No. 9 on the Billboard chart of World Music albums in 2006.

The album's title track, "The Water is Wide," was used on an episode of The Bold and the Beautiful on November 23, 2009 and was one of the ten most requested soap songs of 2009 on Soap.com. The song was also used during the 2009 Emmy Awards.

== Track listing ==
No.	Title	Arranged By	Length
1	She Moved Thro' The Fair	Órla Fallon, Denise Kelly	3:56
2	Aililiu na Gamhna	Órla Fallon, Denise Kelly	2:34
3	Cad É sin Don Te Sin	Órla Fallon, Denise Kelly	3:01
4	Carrickfergus	Órla Fallon, Peter Eades	4:15
5	Siúil A Rún	Marc Armstrong	3:46
6	Down by the Sally Gardens	Órla Fallon, Peter Eades	3:34
7	Na Buachailli Alainn	Denise Kelly	1:59
8	Raglan Road	Denise Kelly	4:17
9	Gartan Mothers Lullaby	Denise Kelly	3:03
10	An Mhaighdean Mhara	Denise Kelly	3:11
11	The Water Is Wide	Órla Fallon, Peter Eades	3:24

Aililiu na Gamhna, in English, means "Calling Home the Calves."

An Mhaighdean Mhara, in English, means "The Mermaid."
