= Carrickfergus (song) =

Irish folk song

"Carrickfergus" is an Irish folk song, named after the town of Carrickfergus in County Antrim, Northern Ireland. The Clancy Brothers' 1964 album titled "The First Hurrah!" includes this title. A somewhat differing version was released under the name "The Kerry Boatman", by Dominic Behan on an LP called The Irish Rover, in 1965.

== Origins ==
The modern song is due to Dominic Behan, who published it in 1965. Behan relates that he learned the song from actor Peter O'Toole. In his book, "Ireland Sings" (London, 1965), Behan gives three verses, the first and third of which he says that he obtained from O'Toole and the middle one that he wrote himself. The 1964 album "The First Hurrah!" by The Clancy Brothers includes a song entitled "Carrickfergus (Do Bhí Bean Uasal)". The melody has been traced to an Irish-language song, "Do Bhí Bean Uasal" ("There Was a Noblewoman"), which is attributed to the poet Cathal Buí Mac Giolla Ghunna, who died in 1756 in County Clare. Music collector George Petrie obtained two settings of this melody from fellow collector Patrick Joyce. Joyce came from Ballyorgan in the Ballyhoura Mountains, on the borders of counties Limerick and Cork. Petrie wrote that he believed "Do Bhí Bean Uasal" came from either County Clare or County Limerick, and was in any case a Munster song.

An early version of the song appeared on a ballad sheet in Cork City in the mid-nineteenth century in macaronic form. The Irish lyrics were about a man being cuckolded, a bawdy and humorous ditty. By contrast, the English language lyrics are nostalgic, albeit with a slightly humorous twist at the end.

Robert Gogan suggests that Carrickfergus may have evolved from at least two separate songs, which would explain why it does not have a consistent narrative. For example, the Ancient Music of Ireland, published by George Petrie in 1855, contained an Irish-language song called "An Bhean Uasal" which featured many but not all of the sentiments used in Carrickfergus. Gogan also refers to a recording of a song called "Sweet Maggie Gordon" which is kept in the Music for the Nation section of the US Library of Congress. It was published by Mrs Pauline Lieder, in New York in 1880. It contains verses which are similar to Carrickfergus, but the chorus is closer to another Irish/Scottish folk song called "Peggy Gordon".

== Kilkenny ==
The story seems to surround Kilkenny; indeed the "Ballygran" referred to in the song may be the local Ballingarry coal mines, so that the "marble...black as ink" in the lyrics would be a reference to coal.

Irish-American journalist Niall O'Dowd (2021) has compared the song to its Scottish equivalent "Over the Water", suggesting that the song may have originally referred to Kilmeny on the Scottish island of Islay. Kilmeny is a hamlet next to the Ballygrant quarry which, he suggests, is the "Ballygran" mentioned in the lyrics. In contrast to the Ballingarry coal mines, Ballygrant quarry did indeed produce a "dark-grey to black marble" variant of Islay limestone, which was a primary source of employment for locals during the 18th and 19th centuries. O'Dowd suggests that, because of the centuries of travel between Ulster and Scotland, there is more of a connection between Carrickfergus and Islay than there is with Kilkenny.

The confusion between Kilmeny and Kilkenny could further derive from the fact that Kilkenny, Ireland, does indeed produce a black marble "as black as ink."

== Performances ==
The song has been recorded by many well-known performers. It is a popular request at folk festivals and concerts, and was played at the 1999 funeral of John F. Kennedy Jr. The song was more recently performed by Loudon Wainwright III over the closing credits of an episode of HBO's series Boardwalk Empire. Furthermore, the Russian singer-songwriter Aleksandr Karpov (a.k.a. "Aleksandr O'Karpov") translated the lyrics into Russian, recording a Russian version of "Carrickfergus", also titled "За синим морем, за океаном" (Za sinim morem, za okeanom – "Beyond the blue sea, beyond the ocean").

Other recordings of "Carrickfergus" have been made by Bob Dylan, Pete Seeger, The Seekers and two former members of The Byrds, Roger McGuinn and Chris Hillman, who both did solo versions. Bryan Ferry also did a version on his 1978 album The Bride Stripped Bare. A cover of the song is also included on The McKrells' 2000 album "Hit The Ground Running". Dexys Midnight Runners released their version of the song on an album of Irish and Country songs, and closed their 2023 concert shows each night with it during the encore following their 1980 No. 1 hit Geno

The song is referenced in the song "Galway Girl", written and performed by Ed Sheeran on his 2017 album "Divide".

The song "The Water is Wide" has a similar tune and very similar lyrics in some lines.

=== List of recordings ===
- Dermot Kennedy, as Carrickfergus, Live in Ireland, RTE#1 show
- Joe Dassin, as Mon village du bout du monde on the album Joe Dassin (Les Champs-Élysées) (1969)
- The Dubliners, on the album Now (1975)
- Paddy Reilly, on the album The Town I Loved So Well (1975)
- Five Hand Reel, on the album For A' That (1977)
- Bryan Ferry, on the album The Bride Stripped Bare (1979)
- Loreena McKennitt, with main vocals by Cedric Smith, on the album Elemental (1985)
- Van Morrison and The Chieftains, on the album Irish Heartbeat (1988)
- Joan Baez, on the album Speaking of Dreams (1989)
- Van Morrison, on the album Van Morrison: The Concert (1990)
- Danny O'Flaherty, on the album Remember (1997)
- Anne Buckley and Ronan Hardiman on the album Feet of Flames (1999)
- Neck, perform it in the Film 4 Movie With or Without You Directed by Michael Winterbottom (1999)
- Darren Holden, on the album Golden Irish Favourites (1999)
- Harry O'Donoghue, on the album Live and Well (2000)
- Órla Fallon, on the album The Water Is Wide (2000)
- Charlotte Church, on the album Enchantment (2001)
- Declan Galbraith, on the album Declan (2002)
- The Dubliners, on the album 40 Years (2002)
- Lisa Kelly, on the album Lisa (2003)
- The Chieftains, on the album Live from Dublin: A Tribute to Derek Bell (2005)
- Celtic Woman, on the album Celtic Woman: A New Journey (2007)
- Irish Stew of Sindidun, on the album Dare to Dream (2008)
- Bryn Terfel, on the album Scarborough Fair-Songs from the British Isles (2008)
- Spillane John, on the album More Irish Songs we Learned at School (2009)
- Ronan Keating, on the album Songs For My Mother (2009)
- Allison Moorer, on BBC television Transatlantic Sessions Series 4, episode 5 (2009)
- Katherine Jenkins, on the album Daydream (2011)
- Loudon Wainwright III, on the album Boardwalk Empire Volume 1: Music from the HBO Original Series (2011)
- Donna Taggart, on the album Celtic Lady, Vol. 1 (2011)
- Green Crow, on the album Письмо из бутылки (A letter from a bottle) (2012)
- 10,000 Maniacs, on the album Twice Told Tales (2015)
- Damien Leith, on the album Songs from Ireland (2015)
- By Toutatis, on the album The Beasts (2015)
- Dexys, on the album Let the Record Show: Dexys Do Irish and Country Soul (2016)
- Jason Manford, on the album A Different Stage (2017)
- Voces8 and Sibéal Ní Chasaide, on the album Enchanted Isle (2019)
- Dexys (a.k.a. Dexys Midnight Runners) on the album Let The Record Show: Dexys Do Irish And Country Soul.
- Glen Hansard on the studio version Funkhaus Version (2026)
