= Songs of Ireland =

Songs of Ireland are Irish songs

Songs of Ireland may also refer to:

- Songs of Ireland 1926 film directed by James A. FitzPatrick with Peggy Shaw and James Knight
- Songs of Ireland, album by Mary O'Hara 1958 Tradition LP 1024
- Songs of Ireland, another album by Mary O'Hara Decca-Emerald 1967
- Songs of Ireland, album by Kenneth McKellar 1964
- Songs of Ireland, album by Steve Benbow 1966
- Songs of Ireland, album by The Ed Sullivan Orchestra and Chorus 1968
- Songs of Ireland (Brobdingnagian Bards album) 2002
- Songs of Ireland, album by James Kilbane 2008
