= The Water Is Wide =

"The Water Is Wide" may refer to:

- The Water Is Wide (book) (1972), by Pat Conroy
- The Water Is Wide (2006 film), a Hallmark Hall of Fame TV movie based on Pat Conroy's book
- "The Water Is Wide" (song), a British folk song of Scottish origin
- The Water Is Wide (Charles Lloyd album) by jazz musician Charles Lloyd
- The Water is Wide (Órla Fallon album) by Irish singer Órla Fallon
- "The Water is Wide" (The Unit), an episode of the television series The Unit
