= The Black Knight (film) =

1954 medieval adventure film by Tay Garnett

- Theatrical release poster
- Directed by: Tay Garnett
- Written by: Alec Coppel; Bryan Forbes; Dennis O'Keefe
- Produced by: Irving Allen; Albert R. Broccoli
- Starring: Alan Ladd; Patricia Medina; Peter Cushing; Harry Andrews
- Cinematography: John Wilcox
- Edited by: Gordon Pilkington
- Music by: John Addison
- Production company: Warwick Films
- Distributed by: Columbia Pictures
- Release date: 28 October 1954
- Running time: 85 minutes
- Countries: United Kingdom; United States
- Language: English
- Budget: $1 million (approx)
- Box office: $1.3 million (US)

The Black Knight is a 1954 British-American Technicolor medieval adventure film directed by Tay Garnett and starring Alan Ladd as the title character and Peter Cushing and Patrick Troughton as two conspirators attempting to overthrow King Arthur. It is the last of Ladd's trilogy with Warwick Films, the others being The Red Beret and Hell Below Zero based on Hammond Innes' book The White South.

== Plot ==
The blacksmith and swordsmith John is tutored at the court of King Arthur, but as a commoner he cannot hope to win the hand of Lady Linet, daughter of the Earl of Yeonil. The earl's castle is attacked by Saracens and Cornishmen — disguised as Vikings — and his wife is killed, making him lose his memory. The attack was part of a plot by the Saracen Sir Palamides and the pagan Cornish King Mark to overthrow Arthur and Christianity and take over the country, whilst pretending to be Arthur's friends and allies; Palamides is a knight of the Round Table and Mark has faked his own baptism.

John accuses Palamides' servant Bernard of murder before Arthur, who grants him three months' grace to prove the accusation or face execution himself. Another knight, Sir Ontzlake, takes pity on John and trains him in swordplay so that he can take on an alternative secret identity as the wandering Black Knight. The "Vikings" raid a newly founded monastery and take Lady Linet and its monks to Stonehenge for a pagan sacrifice, but the Black Knight arrives and saves her, closely followed by Arthur and his knights, who defeat the pagans and destroy Stonehenge.

Sir Palamides tricks the Lady Linet into his castle to try to get her to reveal the Black Knight's identity, but John is informed of this and saves her, still in disguise. Sir Ontzlake then sends him to King Mark's castle, where a pro-Arthur woodcarver shows him a secret tunnel into the royal chambers. John arrives in time to overhear Mark and Palamides finalising their plot but Palamides beats him back to Camelot, tricking Arthur into thinking that the Black Knight is leading the Viking raids. John arrives dressed as the Black Knight and, despite revealing his identity, is briefly imprisoned until Lady Linet and Sir Ontzlake free him, with the latter standing bail for John to Arthur.

John returns to Mark's castle, where he traps Mark's forces and kidnaps Mark. The following morning the Saracens land near Camelot and Sir Palamides and Bernard trick their way into Camelot. Bernard stabs a man in Arthur's bed, only to find it is a bound Mark and not Arthur. John chases Bernard and he falls from the battlements, whilst Arthur's knights trick the Saracens by replying to their fire-arrow signal, which was to have been the signal for the Cornish to join the Saracen attack. The knights defeat the Saracens beneath Camelot's walls, while inside them John beats Palamides single-handed. As a reward Arthur knights John and offers him his "heart's desire". John asks to marry the Lady Linet, and both she and Arthur accept.

== Cast ==
- Alan Ladd as John
- Patricia Medina as Linet
- André Morell as Sir Ontzlake
- Harry Andrews as The Earl of Yeonil
- Peter Cushing as Sir Palamides
- Anthony Bushell as King Arthur
- Laurence Naismith as Major Domo
- Patrick Troughton as King Mark
- Bill Brandon as Bernard
- Ronald Adam as The Abbot
- Basil Appleby as Sir Hal
- Thomas Moore as the Apprentice
- Jean Lodge as Queen Guinevere
- Pauline Jameson as Lady Yeonil
- John Kelly as The Woodchopper
- John Laurie as James
- Olwen Brookes as Lady Ontzlake
- David Paltenghi as High Priest
- Elton Hayes as Minstrel

== Production ==
The Black Knight was the fourth film Alan Ladd made outside the US in order to qualify for a tax exemption. His fee was $200,000 as against 10% of the gross.

Filming started in September 1953. Shooting took place at Pinewood Studios, with exterior shots filmed at Castell Coch, Wales, and on location in Ávila, Spain. Producer Irving Allen called Spain "a wonderful country to make pictures in" because of its more than 2,000 old castles, twelve of which were used in the film. The film's sets were designed by the art director Alex Vetchinsky.

Halfway through production, Bryan Forbes was called in to do some rewriting of the script (he is credited as "additional dialogue by..."). According to Forbes's memoirs, Alan Ladd's wife and long-time agent, Sue Carol, had script approval and objected to a scene where her husband's character stole a horse. 'During a script conference she repeated "Alan Ladd does not steal a horse, period. I'm telling you. He steals a horse, we lose the Boy Scouts Association and the Daughters of the American Revolution, to say nothing of his fan club." Irving [Allen], the senior producer was equal to the occasion and replied "He's not stealing a horse, Sue, he's borrowing a horse. You know like a Hertz car." "So, show me the difference" said Mrs Ladd, "You keep the stolen horse in and you start looking for another star because we're gonna be on the next plane home." "How would it be" I said, "if we kept all the action up to the point where Mr Ladd disposes single-handedly of the attacking Vikings, then he runs to a sentry and says "Is that the horse I ordered?" The sentry nods in agreement and Mr Ladd jumps on the horse and rides over the drawbridge?" "Yeah, I'll buy that" said Mrs Ladd and that is what we shot.' She also instructed Forbes when writing dialogue for Ladd to "keep him monosyllabic".

Donald Sinden, then a contract star for the Rank Organisation at Pinewood Studios, had a permanent dressing room in the same block as Ladd's. He said "(Ladd) brought in his entourage a double-come-stunt man who bore an uncanny resemblance to him. The double did all the long shots, most of the medium shots and even appeared in two-shots when the hero had his back to the camera. The 'star' only did eleven days work in the entire film. He was extremely short in stature and unless he was alone, the camera could never show his feet, because if he was stationary he was standing on a box; if walking, the other actors were in specially dug troughs or ditches and for anything between, all other actors were required to stand with their legs apart and their knees bent."

The title tune for the film was "The Whistling Gypsy". For this purpose it was given new lyrics by its songwriter, Leo Maguire, and Elton Hayes, who sang it in the film.

The budget was £297,728 plus an additional budget of $450,000 to cover the cost of Ladd, Broccoli and Allen, and director Garnett.

== Assessments ==
One critic, Jeffrey Richards, thought Ladd badly miscast, "playing the part like a tired American businessman prevailed upon to take the lead in a revival of Merrie England". By contrast Andrews and Bushell "played their parts for all and more than they were worth, giving every one of the pseudo-archaic line (e.g., 'Away with him, his presence doth offend our sense of honour') the full treatment: resonant Shakespearean delivery and Lyceum flourishes".

Filmink argued "it has an entertaining story and strong support cast, but Ladd looks too American, too old, too puffy, too obviously playing a role where his heart’s not in it, too silly in armour, and with a bad haircut."

A lot of footage from this film was re-used in the low-budget, 1963 matinée film Siege of the Saxons, which is also set in Arthurian times – even the short-sleeved signature armour of the Black Knight reappears for the sake of continuity.
