= Christmas in Brobdingnag, Vol 1 =

A Christmas in Brabdingnag, Vol 1

EP by Brobdingnagian Bards
- Released: December 26, 2005
- Genre: Christmas
- Label: Mage

Brobdingnagian Bards chronology
| Brobdingnagian Fairy Tales (2005) | A Christmas in Brabdingnag, Vol 1 (2005) | The Holy Grail of Irish Drinking Songs (2006) |

Christmas in Brobdingnag, Vol 1 is a short set of Christmas songs infused with the Bards' unique style. The band kept to their standard autoharp/recorder lineup, creating a "Little Drummer Boy" without drums, and a "Carol of the Bells" without bells. "Bog Down in Christmas" is a holiday parody of the Irish tune "Bog Down in the Valley," which the band performs on its Songs of Ireland album. The album is then finished off with a classic instrumental version of "What Child is This?," and an original comedy song "Christmas Time in Texas."

== Track listing ==
1. "Little Drummer Boy" – 3:20
2. "Carol of the Bells" – 1:51
3. "Bog Down in Christmas" – 4:41
4. "What Child Is This?" – 4:01
5. "Christmas Time in Texas" – 4:06
