= The First Hurrah! =

Studio album by The Clancy Brothers and Tommy Makem
- Released: March 1964
- Recorded: 18–20 and 30 December 1963; New York City
- Genre: Irish folk
- Label: Columbia
- Producer: Tom Wilson

The Clancy Brothers and Tommy Makem chronology
In Person at Carnegie Hall (1963)	The First Hurrah! (1964)	Recorded Live in Ireland (1965)

Singles from The First Hurrah!
- 1. "The Leaving of Liverpool"/"Gallant Forty-Twa"

Professional ratings
Review scores
Source	Rating
Record Mirror	3/5 stars

The First Hurrah! is a collection of traditional Irish folk songs performed by The Clancy Brothers and Tommy Makem. It was their fifth album for Columbia Records and was released in 1964. The album's title is likely a play on Edwin O'Connor's 1956 novel The Last Hurrah. The original LP featured liner notes by critic Robert Sherman. The album appeared on the Billboard charts and its single, "The Leaving of Liverpool," on the Irish Top 10 charts.

== Reception ==
Billboard chose the album as a "Special Merit Pick." The magazine's review praised the Clancys and Makem's "fun and exuberance" and referred to the record as "another strong sampling of the boys' zesty and humorous approach" to Irish folklore. Billboard also reviewed the singles record taken from The First Hurrah!, which Columbia released prior to the full LP. The article rated "The Leaving of Liverpool" with four stars. Side B of the single, "The Gallant Forty-Twa," received three stars.

== Track listing ==
All songs traditional. 'The selections were all arranged and adapted by Liam Clancy, Pat Clancy and Tommy Makem - with the assistance of David Hammond on "Gallant Forty-Twa".'

=== Side one ===
1. "The Leaving of Liverpool" - 2:46
2. "The Mermaid" – 3:00
3. "Rocky Road to Dublin" – 2:28
4. "Johnny Todd" – 2:02
5. "Rosin the Bow" – 2:37
6. "The West's Awake" – 3:22

=== Side two ===
1. "Row, Bullies, Row" – 1:39
2. "Gallant Forty-Twa" – 2:29
3. "An Poc Ar Buile (The Mad Goat)" – 2:31
4. "Carrickfergus" – 2:30
5. "Bonny Charlie" – 3:30
6. "Kelly, the Boy from Killann" – 2:35

== Personnel ==
- Liam Clancy - vocals, guitar
- Pat Clancy - vocals, harmonica
- Tom Clancy - vocals
- Tommy Makem - vocals, banjo, tin whistle

The sound of a drum can be heard on the eighth track, but it is not certain who played it. Also, a mandolin is played on the first track, but it is also not certain who played it.

== Chart positions ==
The First Hurrah! spent six weeks on Billboard Magazine's list of the top 150 full-length albums of all genres released in the United States. On 30 May the album reached #91 in the chart, its highest position.

Year	Chart	Position
1964	Billboard Top LPs	91

"The Leaving of Liverpool" from the album stayed on the singles chart in Ireland for a few weeks. It reached #6 on the chart and stayed there for two weeks in late March 1964.

Year	Chart	Position
1964	Irish singles chart	6
