= Gartan Mother's Lullaby =

Song
- Published: 1904
- Songwriter(s): Seosamh MacCathmhaoil (Lyrics)

"Gartan Mother's Lullaby" is an old Irish song and poem written by Herbert Hughes and Seosamh Mac Cathmhaoil, first published in Songs of Uladh [Ulster] in 1904. Hughes collected the traditional melody in Donegal the previous year and Campbell wrote the lyrics. The song is a lullaby by a mother, from the parish of Gartan in County Donegal. The song refers to a number of figures in Irish mythology, places in Ireland and words in the Irish language.

== Pronunciation ==
- Aoibheall, (pronounced "ee-val" /ˈiːvəl/) commonly known as Aoibhinn the Beautiful, is the queen of the Northern Fairies.
- The Green Man, (or Fear Glas in Irish) it is said if you see him in the morning, "no ill follows"; but if at night, death or some other terrible misfortune will surely overtake you. He is sometimes called Fear Liath, or the Grey Man.
- Siabhra (pronounced "sheev-rah" /'ʃivɹə/), is typically a term for wicked or malevolent fairies, but in this instance is used as a generic term for an Irish fairy of any kind.
- Tearmann, Irish for Termon, a village near Gartan in Donegal.
- Leanbhan, is an old Irish word for little child. (leanbh is Irish for child +án leanbhán is its diminutive.)

== Recordings ==
- 2016 - UCD Choral Scholars covered on the album "Invisible Stars"
- 2016 - Lisa Cuthbert covered on the album Paramour
- 2011 - Screaming Orphans covered on the album The Jacket's Green
- 2011 - Deirdre Shannon covered on the album Anamcheol
- 2010 - Peter Roberts covered on the album Love and the Ferryman
- 2010 - Fionnuala Sherry covered on the album Songs From Before
- 2007 -Tracey Rose Brown covered on the album " Songs In The Mist"
- 2007 -Allison Grivan covered on the album " Resonance"
- 2006 - Órla Fallon, covered on the album The Water Is Wide
- 2002 - Spiral Dance, covered on the album Notes of Being
- 2002 - Kerstin Blodig, covered on the album Valivann
- 2000 - Meryl Streep, recorded for the album For Our Children: 10th Anniversary
- 1992 - Kim Robertson, recorded for the album Tender Shepherd
- 1991 - Paddy Reilly, on his album The Gold and Silver Days
- 1977 - Alba, on their album "Alba"
- 1972 - The Dubliners, on their album Double Dubliners
- 1969 - The Corries, appears on their album Strings and Things
- 1963 - The Ian Campbell Folk Group, appears on their album This Is The Ian Campbell Folk Group!
- 1959 - Deirdre O'Callaghan, appears on their album Folk Songs From Erin
- 1958 - Mary O'Hara, appears on their album Songs Of Ireland
