= A Celtic Renaissance Wedding =

Studio album by Brobdingnagian Bards
- Released: 2004
- Label: Mage

Brobdingnagian Bards chronology
Memories of Middle Earth (2003)	A Celtic Renaissance Wedding (2004)	Brobdingnagian Fairy Tales (2005)

Professional ratings
Review scores
Source	Rating
Allmusic	2.5/5 stars

A Celtic Renaissance Wedding is a compilation of some of the Brobdingnagian Bards' most romantic songs, and their most requested songs for wedding ceremonies and receptions.

== Track listing ==
1. "Shepherd's Serenade"
2. "Bridal Chorus"
3. "Lady Faery"
4. "Maids in the Meadow"
5. "Wild Mountain Thyme"
6. "Eleanor Plunkett"
7. "Frog Kissin'"
8. "The Kiss"
9. "Health to the Company"
10. "When She Held Me in Her Arms"
11. "My Irish Valentine"
12. "Scarborough Faire"
13. "Valeria"
14. "The Bridge"
15. "Tolkien (The Hobbit & Lord of the Rings)"
