= Brobdingnagian Fairy Tales =

Studio album by Brobdingnagian Bards
- Released: July 18, 2005
- Genre: Celtic, filk
- Label: Mage

Brobdingnagian Bards chronology
| A Celtic Renaissance Wedding (2004) | Brobdingnagian Fairy Tales (2005) | Christmas in Brobdingnag, Vol 1 (2005) |

Brobdingnagian Fairy Tales is a compilation of Irish pub songs, various pop culture inspired songs and parodies, and live versions of songs from the Bards' previous albums. A romantic Italian folk song, "Santa Lucia," is also included. The song "Happily Ever After" was inspired by the children's book, The Paper Bag Princess, and "Buttercup's Lament" was inspired by The Princess Bride.

== Track listing ==
1. "None but a Harper (The Last Unicorn)"
2. "Happily Ever After"
3. "Jedi Drinking Song (Star Wars parody)"
4. "Lily the Pink"
5. "Exclamations (Schoolhouse Rock parody)"
6. "Buttercup's Lament"
7. "Monster Mash"
8. "Angel's Lament (Buffy the Vampire Slayer parody)"
9. "The Leprechaun"
10. "Soul of a Harper"
11. "Bog Down in the Valley (Live!)"
12. "Mendeluvium Madness"
13. "The Orange and the Green"
14. "Santa Lucia"
15. "If I Had a Million Ducats (Live! Barenaked Ladies parody)"
16. "Old Dun Cow"
17. "A Prudent Thief"
18. "Frog Kissin'"
