= John Keegan Casey =

Irish poet, orator and republican

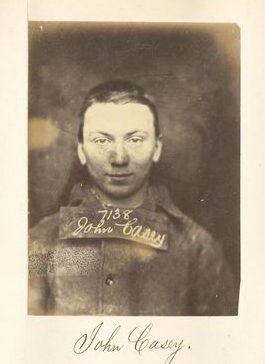
picture of John sarfield Casey aka galtee boy, this is not John Keegan casey

John Keegan "Leo" Casey (1846 – 17 March 1870), known as the Poet of the Fenians, was an Irish poet, orator and republican who was famous as the writer of the song "The Rising of the Moon" and as one of the central figures in the Fenian Rising of 1867. He was imprisoned by the British and died on St. Patrick's Day in 1870.

== Early life ==
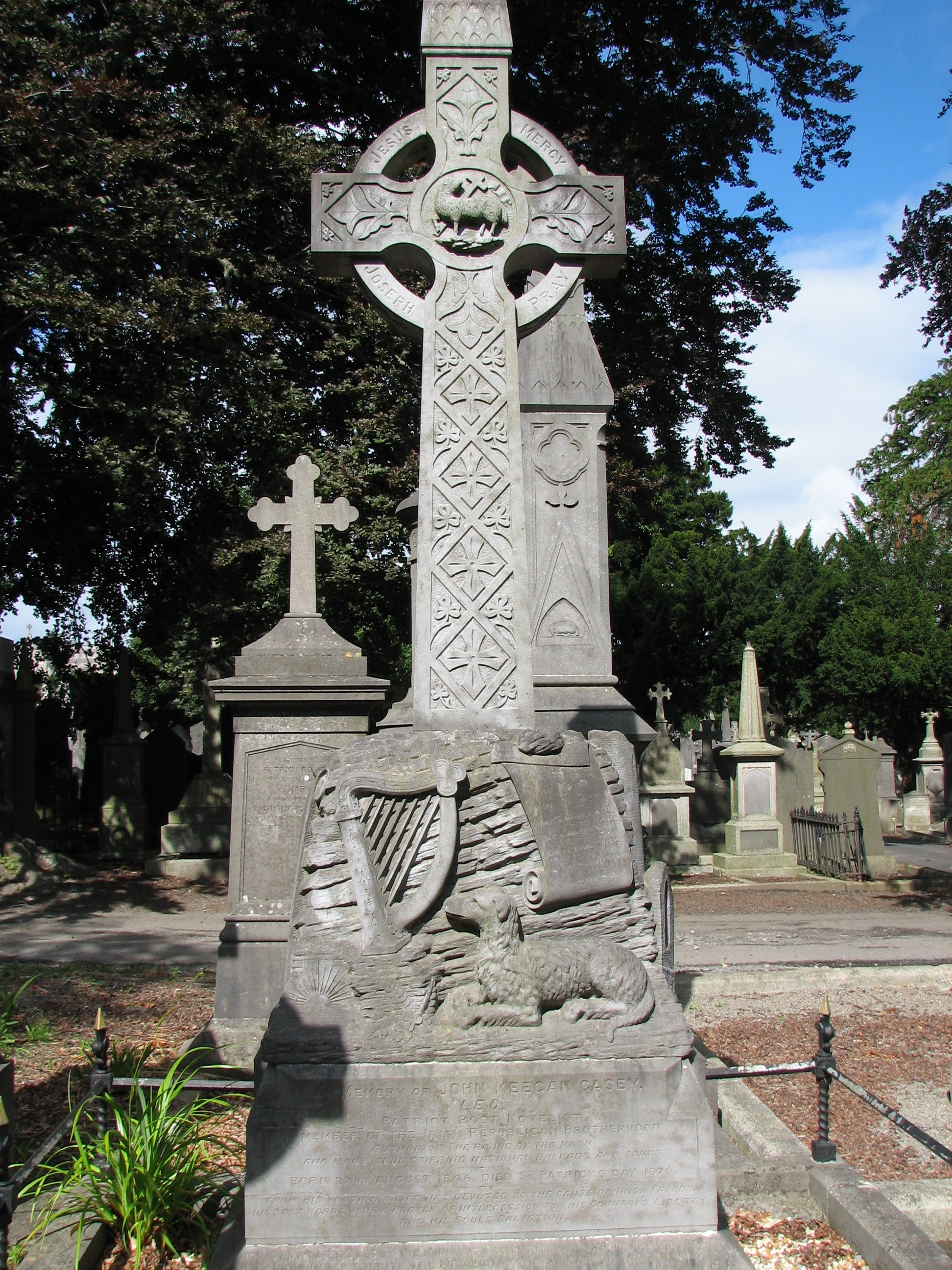
Glasnevin Dublin, John Keegan 'Leo' Casey

He was born in Mount Dalton, County Westmeath to a teacher during the height of the Great Hunger of 1846. Eight years later he moved to Gurteen, near Ballymahon in County Longford, when his father was given the post of head master at the local school. Casey's work would come to be closely associated with Ballymahon.

As a teenager he worked as an assistant to his father and was expected to follow him into teaching; however, he was disillusioned by the insufficiently nationalistic nature of the curriculum and spent a great deal of time writing poetry. It was at this time, reputedly at the age of fifteen, that he wrote his best-known song, "The Rising of the Moon", which commemorates the Irish Rebellion of 1798.

== Fenians ==
Following the increasing popularity of his songs and ballads at nationalist gatherings, he moved to Dublin in the 1860s and became active in the Fenian movement. He was a major contributor to The Nation newspaper, for which he assumed his pen-name of 'Leo'.

In 1866, at the age of 20, he published a collection of poems, entitled A Wreath of Shamrocks; most of the poems therein had already been published elsewhere, primarily in The Nation. The further fame engendered by the success of the book led him to be sought after as a speaker; he addressed mass rallies in Dublin, Liverpool and London that year, in the lead up to the Fenian Rising in 1867.

== Imprisonment ==
When the uprising failed, he was imprisoned without trial for eight months in Mountjoy Prison. Casey was released on the understanding that he would leave for Australia and not return to Ireland. However, he chose to stay on in Summerhill, Dublin in disguise, living as a Quaker and continuing to write and publish in secret.

== Death ==
He married Mary Josephine Briscoe in January 1868 and she bore a son Michael, who died shortly after birth in October 1869. His health had been broken by the treatment he had received in prison. He fell from a cab on or near O’Connell Bridge in the centre of Dublin in 1870. He died from his injuries.

Following his death, on St. Patrick's Day in 1870, he was buried in Glasnevin Cemetery. The newspapers reported that between fifty and one hundred thousand mourners walked in his funeral procession.

== Bibliography ==
- Tell me Shawn O'Farrell: the life and works of John Keegan Casey, by Sean Cahill and Jimmy Casey; the John Keegan Casey Society, Ballymahon, Ireland, 2002, ISBN 9780954328009
