= Rose Brennan =

Irish singer (born 1931)

- Born: Rose Theresa Brennan; 1 January 1931 (age 95); Cabra West, Dublin, Ireland
- Occupation: Singer
- Years active: 1940s–1966
- Known for: Vocalist with the Joe Loss Orchestra
- Spouse(s): George Hirst (m. 1956); John Lamb

Rose Theresa Brennan (born 1 January 1931) is an Irish singer. She is best known for a long spell with the Joe Loss orchestra in the 1950s and 1960s.

== Early life ==
Rose Brennan was born in Cabra West, a suburb of Dublin, Ireland. At the age of 16 she started singing with the Neil Kearns Orchestra at Dublin's Olympic Ballroom, Johnny Devlin's De Luxe Orchestra at the Crystal Ballroom, and the Pavilion (popularly known as "The Hangar") in Salthill, County Galway. Roy Fox booked her in 1949 for his stage show at the Theatre Royal in Dublin. When Fox moved on, Brennan joined the Billy Watson Band at Clery's Ballroom. She was also a regular voice on Radio Éireann's Happy Days and Beginners Please series.

== In the UK ==
In April 1951, Elizabeth Batey, a vocalist with Joe Loss, fell and broke her jaw. Loss was badly in need of a replacement and remembered hearing Brennan on the radio during a visit to Ireland. Within days he had located her and, before a week was out, she was in Manchester rehearsing with the band. She stayed with Loss for 15 years, before giving up show-business in the mid-1960s.

In 1954, she was awarded third place by the New Musical Express for the best recording of the year; this was her cover of Leo Maguire's "The Whistling Gypsy". Her co-vocalists with the orchestra from 1955 were Ross MacManus (father of Elvis Costello) and Larry Gretton.

It was not until 1961 that she reached the UK Singles Chart, when "Tall Dark Stranger" made it to No. 31. One of her next recordings included a number she wrote herself, "My Wedding Day". Her own wedding day was 7 May 1956, when she married George Hirst, son of a Yorkshire businessman, at Wakefield Registry Office.

She sang with the Joe Loss Orchestra until 1966 for weekly BBC programmes, and nightly at the Hammersmith Palais. Brennan gave up show business and retired to run a public house, the Norland Arms in west London, with her second husband John Lamb, an ex-policeman.

Brennan wrote many of the songs she recorded under the name Marella, and co-wrote songs with John Harris.

== Select discography ==
=== Singles ===
- BD 6110 November 1951: "Lili Marlene"
- B 10378 November 1952: "Isle of Innisfree"
- B 10391 December 1952: "Got You on My Mind" (with The Kordites)
- B 10405 January 1953: "A Moth and a Flame"
- B 10427 February 1953: "Why Don't You Believe Me"
- B 10448 March 1953: "Wishing Ring"
- B 10572 October 1953: "If You Love Me" / "The Whistling Gypsy"
- B 10858 April 1955: "When I See a Ship" / "Pledging My Love"
- POP 156 January 1956: "You Are My Love" / "My Dublin Bay"
- POP 200 April 1956: "Courtin' in the Kitchen" / "Those Who Have Loved"
- PB 1193 November 1961: "Tall Dark Stranger" / "The Girl With the Wistful Eyes"
- PB 1229 April 1962: "Come Down the Mountain Katie Daly"
- BF 1267 September 1963: "Don't Do Me Any Favours" / "If Only I Could Say"
- BF 1304 January 1964: "Lipstick Paint a Smile on Me" / "I'm a Lonely One Too"
- BF 1327 April 1964: "Make Room for One More Fool" / "Johnny Let Me Go"
