= Liam Clancy =

Irish folk singer (1935–2009)

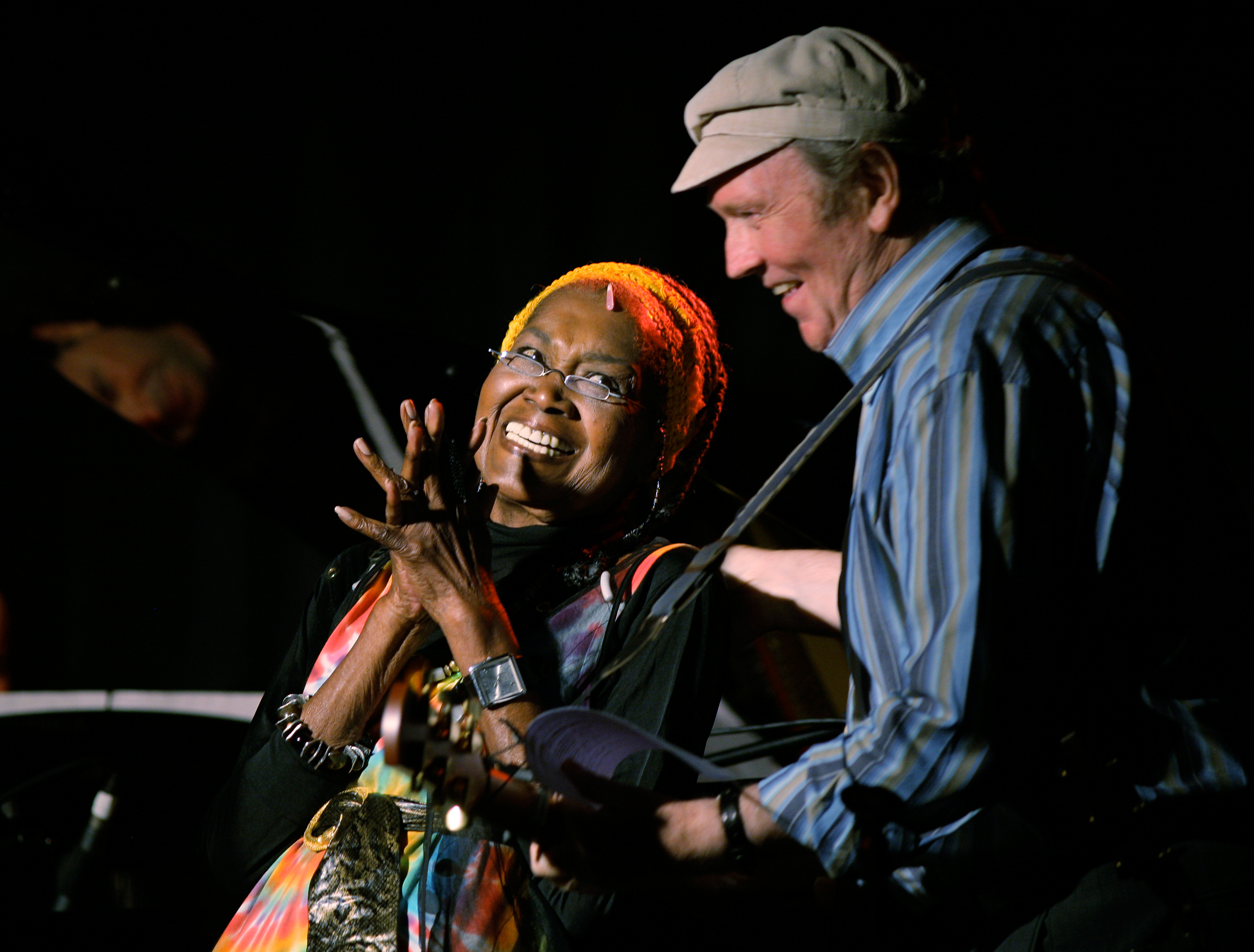
- Liam Clancy (right) with singer Odetta in 2006

Background information
- Born: William Clancy; 2 September 1935; Carrick-on-Suir, County Tipperary, Ireland
- Died: 4 December 2009 (aged 74) Cork, Ireland
- Genres: Folk; traditional Irish
- Occupations: Singer; musician; actor
- Instruments: Vocals; guitar; concertina
- Years active: 1955–2009
- Website: liamclancy.com

Liam Clancy (Irish: Liam Mac Fhlannchadha; 2 September 1935 – 4 December 2009) was an Irish folk singer from Carrick-on-Suir, County Tipperary. He was the youngest member of the influential folk group the Clancy Brothers, regarded as Ireland's first pop stars. They achieved global sales of millions and appeared in sold-out concerts at such prominent venues as Carnegie Hall and the Royal Albert Hall.

Liam was generally considered to be the group's most powerful vocalist. Bob Dylan regarded him as the greatest ballad singer ever. In 1976, as part of the duo Makem and Clancy, he had a number one hit in Ireland with the anti-war song "And the Band Played Waltzing Matilda" (written by Scots-Australian Eric Bogle). Upon his death The Irish Times said his legacy was secured.

== Early life ==
He was born at Carrick-on-Suir, County Tipperary, Ireland on 2 September 1935, the ninth and youngest surviving child (two died in childhood) of Robert Joseph Clancy and Joanna McGrath. As a child, he was known as William or Willie, named after his mother's hero Willie Doyle. He later acquired the nickname 'Liam' from Cyril Cusack as 'William' was "too English". The Clancys were a republican family with Liam's uncle Peter McGrath serving under Dan Breen in a flying column during the Irish War of Independence. He displayed an artistic disposition at an early age, while growing up in Carrick-on-Suir. The first song he learned was "The Croppy Boy". He received a Christian Brothers education before taking a job as an insurance man in Dublin. Whilst there he also took night classes at the National College of Art and Design.

Still in his teens, Liam explored writing and painting, though he was particularly drawn to the theatre. In his early performing days, he began to call himself Liam. Before he was twenty years old, Liam had founded the local dramatic society now called "Brewery Lane Theatre and Arts Centre", and had produced, directed, set-directed, and starred in John Millington Synge's The Playboy of the Western World. Liam also performed at the renowned Gaiety Theatre in Dublin. He encountered Diane Hamilton Guggenheim when she came to his hometown to visit his mother, and set off on a tour of Ireland alongside her. During her 1955 trip to Keady, Clancy encountered Tommy Makem for the first time. He later moved to New York City and referred to Greenwich Village as "the island for people escaped from repressed backgrounds".

== Singing career ==
=== Clancy Brothers ===
Liam Clancy began singing with his brothers, Paddy and Tom Clancy, at fund-raising events for the Cherry Lane Theatre and the Guthrie benefits. The Clancy Brothers and Tommy Makem began recording on Paddy Clancy's Tradition Records label in the late 1950s. Liam Clancy played guitar in addition to singing and also recorded several solo albums. They recorded their seminal The Rising of the Moon album in 1959, giving live performances in the American cities Boston, Chicago and New York. A record-breaking sixteen-minute-long performance on American TV's The Ed Sullivan Show on 17 March 1961 launched the group into stardom. They were supposed to only play two songs but the main act cancelled at short notice. There were international tours, which included performances at Carnegie Hall (a sell-out in 1962) and the Royal Albert Hall. Their trademark attire was Aran geansaí—these were sent across the water by Mrs. Clancy for her sons to wear against the unforgiving American climate. The quartet recorded numerous albums for Columbia Records and enjoyed great success during the 1960s folk revival. Liam was a close friend of Bob Dylan when they both were going out with two sisters in New York. Dylan described Liam as "the best ballad singer I’d ever heard in my life". He performed live for United States President John F. Kennedy.

In 1964, thirty per cent of all albums sold in Ireland were Clancy Brothers and Tommy Makem records. Although better known for their full-length albums, the Clancy Brothers' single, "The Leaving of Liverpool" (from the album, The First Hurrah!), which featured Liam in the lead, reached the number six spot on the Irish charts in 1964. Liam played the guitar in almost all the recordings of the Clancy Brothers, and he took lead vocals in many songs, including "The Wild Rover", "The Shoals of Herring", "Port Lairge", "The Juice of the Barley", "The Patriot Game", "The Gallant Forty Twa", "The Jolly Tinker", "The Nightingale", "Peggy Gordon", "Old Maid in the Garrett", and "The Parting Glass", which closed every Clancy Brothers concert.

Liam Clancy was the last surviving member of the original Clancy Brothers. Tom Clancy died on 7 November 1990, Patrick Clancy died on 11 November 1998, and Tommy Makem died on 1 August 2007. Bobby Clancy, who had joined the group in 1969, died on 6 September 2002. Liam said of his status as the last of the brothers: "There was always a pecking order, especially when you're working with family. But they all died off, and I got to the top of the pecking order, with nobody looking over my shoulder. There's a great sense of freedom about that".

=== Solo career ===
After The Clancy Brothers split up, Liam had a solo career in Canada, where he made several television performances on the CBC's national television variety program, The Irish Rovers Show from Vancouver, British Columbia. He had a hit with "The Dutchman" at this time, and he presented his own television show in Calgary, also appearing on the CBC concert series Summer Evening in 1976. In 1975, he was booked to play a festival in Cleveland, Ohio, US, where Tommy Makem was also playing. The two played a set together and formed the group Makem and Clancy, performing in numerous concerts and recording several albums together until 1988. The original Clancy Brothers and Tommy Makem line-up also got back together in the 1980s for a reunion tour and album. After the death of Tom Clancy in 1990, Liam sang with Paddy and Bobby Clancy and nephew Robbie O'Connell as part of The Clancy Brothers and Robbie O'Connell. He also performed alongside his Fayreweather Band and the Phil Coulter Orchestra. With Coulter, Clancy had a top four hit single in 1989, "Home from the Sea".

In later life, Liam maintained a solo career accompanied by musicians Paul Grant and Kevin Evans, whilst also engaging in other pursuits. He lived in Ring, County Waterford at this stage. His home in Waterford was designed by the celebrity architect Duncan Stewart and featured solar panels which were innovative at the time. He subsequently converted his large garage into a recording studio.

He received an honorary doctorate from the University of Limerick in 2001.

In 2001, Liam Clancy published a memoir titled The Mountain of the Women. He also was in No Direction Home, the 2005 Bob Dylan documentary directed by Martin Scorsese.

In 2006, Clancy was profiled in a two-hour documentary titled The Legend of Liam Clancy, produced by Anna Rodgers and John Murray with Crossing the Line Films, and screened on the Irish channel RTÉ. In February 2007, this documentary won the award for best series at the Irish Film and Television Awards in Dublin. In 2008 Liam performed in a filmed concert titled Liam Clancy and Friends: Live at The Bitter End which featured the last filmed performance of his friend Odetta, as well as songs from Tom Paxton, Shane MacGowan, Gemma Hayes, Eric Bibb, and Fionn Regan as well as members of Danú.

The same director Alan Gilsenan went on to direct a full-length biography of Liam Clancy, The Yellow Bittern: The Life and Times of Liam Clancy. This was released at the 2009 Dublin Film Festival and went on to have a theatrical and DVD release in Ireland the UK. The film includes appearances by Pete Seeger, Jean Ritchie, Bob Dylan, Odetta, and many others as well as much unseen archive such as The Clancy Brothers and Tommy Makem at Newport Festival. The Irish Times praised the film and director Gilsenan who it said had "tracked down an impressive number of secondary sources, and his use of other performers' music is often inspired".

His final album The Wheels of Life was released in 2009. It included duets with Mary Black and Gemma Hayes as well as songs by Tom Paxton and Donovan.

Liam was an ardent proponent of political views and often outspoken on matters of social injustice until his death. He criticised both Gulf Wars and the grim, harsh economic climate which gripped Ireland during his last months.

Clancy told The Irish Times in September 2009 that he was on his "last legs". He had already given his final performance, at the National Concert Hall the previous May, during which he recited the Dylan Thomas poem "And death shall have no dominion". He was unable to perform a full-length show on the closing night of a two-night sold-out run but put in a 40-minute appearance nonetheless. His manager described it as "...a very profound moment. He expressed his fear of dying, but he did it with great dignity".

== Death ==
Liam Clancy died from pulmonary fibrosis on 4 December 2009, in Bon Secours Hospital in Cork, Ireland. His brother Bobby died of the same disease seven years previously. He was buried in the new cemetery in An Rinn, County Waterford, where he spent the last years of his life, owning a successful recording studio. He was survived by his wife, Kim, and their four children: Eben, Siobhán, Fiona and Donal, as well as three previous children: Sean, Andrew and Anya.

His son Eben was in the process of coming over from the United Kingdom and he had a last telephone chat with his son Donal who was in the middle of a tour of California. The other three sat beside him as he died. Liam had intended to give another interview at the time but succumbed to the disease.

The leader of Fine Gael, Enda Kenny, mourned the loss of a "brilliant musician". Minister for Arts, Sport and Tourism Martin Cullen said, "Liam Clancy was a nationally and internationally renowned folk singer and was an example of an absolutely dedicated artistic craftsman. This generous and life-giving person enriched all of our lives with memorable songs and was part of the fabric of Ireland's proud traditional music culture". Alan Gilsenan described the death as the "end of an era".

Radio disc jockeys in New York paid tribute to the man who, according to the New York Daily News, "played a major role in defining how Americans heard Irish popular music over the last half century", with one DJ saying The Clancy Brothers had "broke down a wall that was long overdue". Christy Moore, on a prescheduled appearance on The Late Late Show aired live on the night of Liam's death, said, "I would have been listening to Radio Luxembourg and rock 'n' roll as a young fellow and then I got to hear of the Clancy brothers, when I was 16 I came to Dublin to hear them in a concert. It was about 1962, I think it was the Olympia, it was the most exciting concert I had ever attended. It was Irish, it was rock 'n' roll, it was funky and it was even sexy".

Clancy's mid-day funeral at St. Mary's Church, Dungarvan, on 7 December was attended by hundreds of mourners, including both the Aides de Camp of the Taoiseach and President of Ireland, Minister Cullen and various musicians and artists. He was later buried in An Rinn.

== Discography ==
=== Solo recordings ===
- 1965 – Liam Clancy – Vanguard LP/CD

*re-released with bonus tracks as 'Irish Troubadour' on Vanguard CD

- 1974 – Farewell to Tarwathie – Plainsong LP

*on Shanachie CD as "The Dutchman"

- 2005 – Favourites
- 2007 – Yes Those Were The Days: The Essential Liam Clancy Dolphin Records
- 2008 – The Wheels of Life, Dolphin Records

=== Guest recordings ===
- 1955 – The Lark in the Morning – Tradition LP/Rykodisc CD
- 1956 – The Countess Cathleen – Tradition LP
- 1989 – Phil Coulter: Words and Music – Shanachie CD
- 1992 – Phil Coulter: A Touch of Tranquility – Shanachie CD
- 1994 – Joanie Madden: Whistle on the Wind – Green Linnet CD
- 1999 – Cherish the Ladies: At Home – RCA CD
- 2000 – The Girls Won't Leave the Boys Alone – Windham Hill CD
- 2002 – Danú: All Things Considered – Shanachie CD

=== Clancy Brothers & Tommy Makem ===
Tradition Records

- The Rising of the Moon (or Irish Songs of Rebellion) (1956, 1959 second version)
- Come Fill Your Glass with Us (or Irish Songs of Drinking and Blackguarding) (1959)
- The Clancy Brothers and Tommy Makem (self-titled) – (1961)

Columbia Records

- A Spontaneous Performance Recording (1961)
- Hearty and Hellish! A Live Nightclub Performance (1962)
- The Boys Won't Leave the Girls Alone (1962; plus several subsequent re-releases, including on Shanachie Records)
- In Person at Carnegie Hall (1963) – also on Columbia CD
- The First Hurrah! (1964)
- Recorded Live in Ireland (1965)
- Isn't It Grand Boys (1966)
- Freedom's Sons (1966)
- In Concert (1967) – also on Columbia CD
- The Irish Uprising (1967)
- Home, Boys, Home (1968)
- Sing of the Sea (1968)
- The Bold Fenian Men (1969)
- Reunion (1984) – Released on Blackbird LP/Shanachie CD
- Luck of the Irish (1992) – Columbia/Sony compilation. Contains 1 new song ("Wars of Germany") and 3 new performances of previously released songs: ("Home Boys Home", "The Old Orange Flute" and "They're Moving Father's Grave to Build a Sewer")
- The 30th Anniversary Concert Celebration (Bob Dylan) (1992)
- Irish Drinking Songs (1993) – contains unreleased material from the Carnegie Hall album
- Ain't It Grand: A Collection of Unissued Gems (1995) – unreleased material from the 1960s era

=== The Clancy Brothers (Liam, Tom, Pat, Bobby) ===
- Christmas – Columbia LP/CD (1969)
- Flowers in the Valley – Columbia LP (1970)

Audio Fidelity Records

- Welcome to Our House (1970)

=== Lou Killen, Paddy, Liam, Tom Clancy ===
Audio Fidelity Records

- Show Me The Way (1972)
- Save the Land! (1972)
- Live on St. Patrick's Day (1973)

Vanguard Records

- The Clancy Brothers' Greatest Hits (1973) – Vanguard LP/CD

*This was reissued as 'Best of the Vanguard Years' with bonus material from the 1982 Live! album with Bobby Clancy and Robbie O'Connell.

=== Liam Clancy and Tommy Makem ===
Blackbird and Shanachie Records

- Tommy Makem and Liam Clancy (1976)
- The Makem & Clancy Concert (1977)
- Two for the Early Dew (1978)
- The Makem and Clancy Collection (1980) – contains previously released material and singles
- Live at the National Concert Hall (1983)
- We've Come A Long Way (1986)

=== Bob Dylan ===
- The 30th Anniversary Concert Celebration (Pat, Liam & Bobby Clancy sing "When The Ship Comes In" with Tommy Makem and Robbie O'Connell)

=== The Clancy Brothers (Tom, Pat, Bobby) and Robbie O'Connell ===
- Mini CD (3 inch disc)

=== The Clancy Brothers (Liam, Pat, Bobby) and Robbie O'Connell ===
- Older But No Wiser – Vanguard (1995)

=== Clancy, Evans, and Doherty ===
- 1996 – Shine on Brighter – Popular CD

=== Clancy, O'Connell & Clancy ===
Helvic Records

- Clancy, O'Connell & Clancy – (1997)
- The Wild And Wasteful Ocean – (1998)

== Filmography ==
- 1984 – The Story of the Clancy Brothers and Tommy Makem – Shanachie
- 1984 – Reunion Concert: Belfast – Shanachie
- circa 1985 – Pete Seeger's Rainbow Quest (1965) – Central Sun / Shanachie (reissue)
- 1997 – Farewell to Ireland – Pinnacle Vision
- 2007 – Yes...Those Were the Days: Liam Clancy – Live at the Olympia, Dublin – unknown distributor

*originally released in 1992 as "In Close Up: Volumes 1 and 2" from a concert recorded in 1989

- 2007 – The Best of 'Hootenanny' – Shout!
- 2009 – The Yellow Bittern: The life and times of Liam Clancy
