= Marc Gunn =

American musician and podcaster

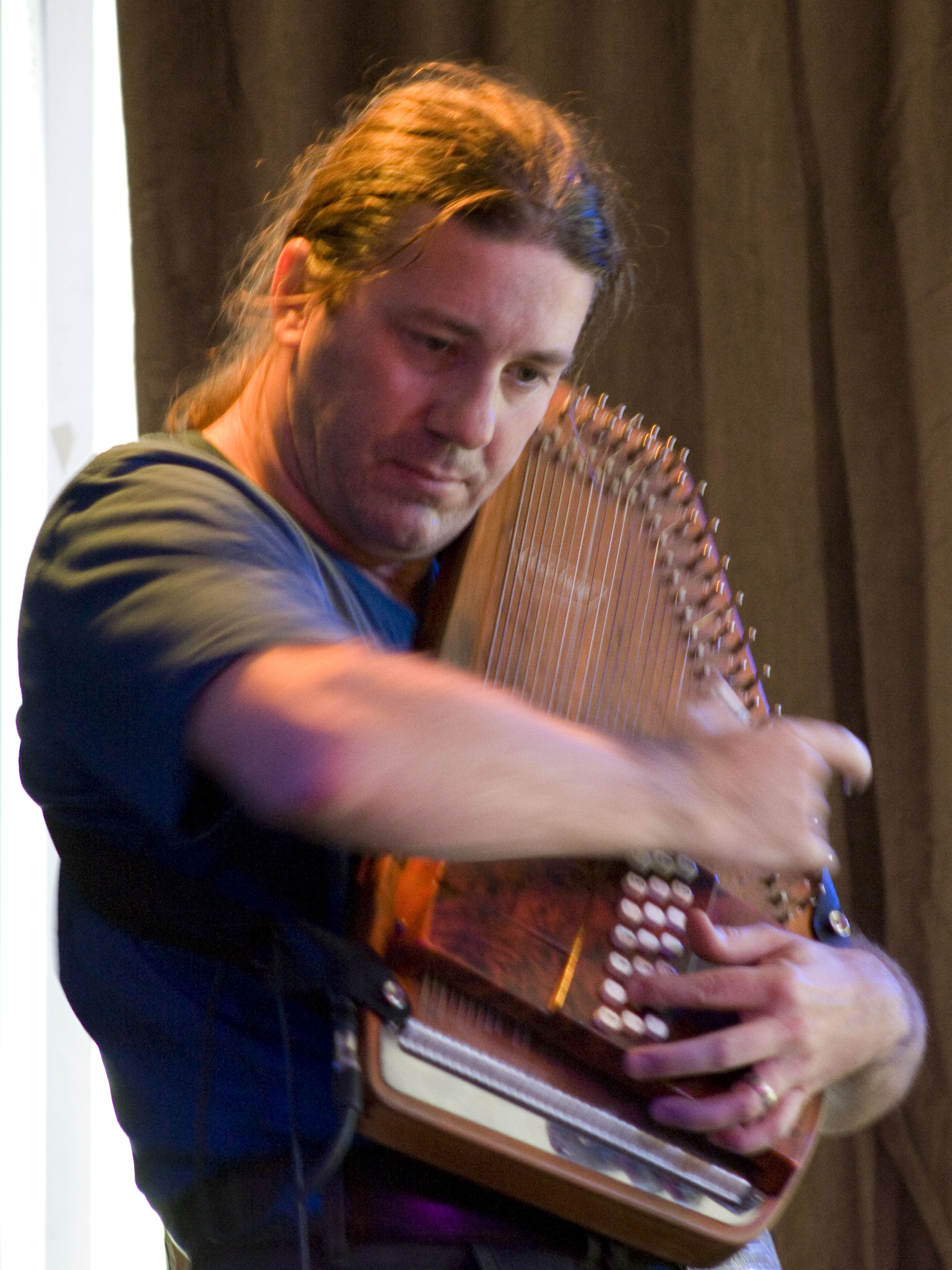
- Marc Gunn performs at the New Deal Cafe in Greenbelt, MD (July 2011)

Background information
- Also known as: The Celtfather
- Born: Marc Andrew Gunn; March 17, 1972 (age 53)
- Genres: Celtic, Irish, Scottish, folk, Renaissance, comedy, novelty, etc.
- Occupations: Musician and podcaster
- Instrument: autoharp
- Website: www.marcgunn.com

Marc Andrew Gunn (born March 17, 1972) is an American musician and podcaster.

Gunn rose to prominence as the autoharp-playing half of the Brobdingnagian Bards. He and partner Andrew McKee developed a following with weekly performances on the campus of the University of Texas at Austin. This led to gigs at renaissance fairs, science fiction conventions, and Celtic music festivals as well as parties and weddings for the pair. The group headlined at the Oscar party for The Lord of the Rings: The Return of the King.

After the group split up in 2008, Gunn became a prolific recording musician in the Celtic music community, releasing eleven new albums between 2008 and 2011. His recording of "Rising of the Moon" earned an award in 2013 in the Celtic Radio Music Awards for "Best Roots Traditional".

Gunn was an early adopter of podcasting and one of the few professional podcasters. He started podcasting in May 2005, but it was July when he released his most-successful podcast, Irish & Celtic Music Podcast. This show began as a spinoff of his Celtic Music Magazine email newsletter. It quickly eclipsed the newsletter's success.

The Irish & Celtic Music Podcast is an hour-long show focusing primarily on independent Celtic musicians and bands. The music styles range from traditional Irish songs and tunes to modern Celtic rock from around the world. It won in the "Best Podsafe Music" category three times in the Podcast Awards in 2009, 2010, and 2017.

== Musical career ==
Marc Gunn began his Celtic music career as one-half of the Brobdingnagian Bards. He produced the Bards' early albums. In 2004, Gunn released his first solo album, Soul of a Harper. He then embarked on work on one of his most-popular albums, Irish Drinking Songs for Cat Lovers.

The Brobdingnagian Bards band broke up amicably on September 15, 2008. Gunn began performing solo. He released several albums a year with four full-length studio albums released in 2008, three in 2009, and two in 2010.

Gunn continued releasing 1–2 albums each year. He began diverging from his traditional Celtic music base with more Geek-themed albums inspired by Firefly, Lord of the Rings, and other science fiction pop culture media shows. He performs solo and with groups at various conventions like Gen Con and Dragon Con each year.

== Podcasting career ==
As a fan of Celtic music, Marc Gunn started the Celtic Music Magazine in 2000. It began as a weekly publication that reviewed Celtic music of all varieties from Irish traditional music to Celtic rock. On July 28, 2005, he began publishing the Irish & Celtic Music Podcast. It was the second podcast of Celtic music to be released.

Gunn created the show to help independent Celtic musicians find new fans. The show grew in popularity. In its early days, it is claimed to have had over 20,000 downloads per episode and was one of the top music podcasts on iTunes. The show currently claims over 10,000 downloads per episode and is in the top 90% of all podcasts, according to Libsyn stats.

The podcast won "Best Podsafe Music" in the annual Podcast Awards for 2009. This win was repeated in 2010 and again in 2017.

Gunn was one of the first professional podcasters. In 2006, he started Song Henge to fund the podcast production. In 2014, he joined Patreon.

== Bibliography ==
- Bella Filíocht : Heartfelt Poetry of a Celtic Italian Hopeful Romantic (2005)
- Mozart's Digital Concerto: The Quick and Easy Guide to Classical Music Downloads (2005)

== Discography ==
- Intent on World Domination with Skander (1995)
- Breastfed with Breastfed (1997)
- Ichabod's Geography (1998)
- October Sessions (1998)
- Mountain Rain (2001)
- Celtic Love & War (2002)
- Soul of a Harper (2004)
- When Kitty Eyes Are Smiling (2005)
- Irish Drinking Songs for Cat Lovers (2005)
- 4 Irish Whiskey Drinking Songs (2006)
- A Collection of Irish Pub Songs (2007)
- Irish Drinking Songs: A Cat Lover's Companion (2007)
- Three Movie and TV Songs for Geeks Like Me (2007)
- A Tribute to Love (2008)
- A Gift of Cat Love (2008)
- Whiskers in the Jar: Irish Songs for Cat Lovers (2008)
- Going for Brogue: Irish Pub Songs and Sea Shanties with an Accent (2008)
- What Color Is Your Dragon? Folk Music with Delusions of Grandeur (2008)
- Heart's Ease: Instrumental Autoharp Music (2009)
- Live at the Cactus Cafe (2009)
- Happy Songs of Death (2009)
- The Bridge (Marc Gunn album)|The Bridge (2010)
- Kilted For Her Pleasure (2010)
- Firefly Drinking Songs with Bedlam Bards (2011)
- Don't Go Drinking With Hobbits (2011)
- Not Every Day Is St. Patrick's Day (2013)
- Scottish Songs of Drinking and Rebellion (2013)
- How America Saved Irish Music with Jamie Haeuser (2014)
- Sci Fi Drinking Songs (2014)
- Celtic Christmas Greetings (2014)
- Celtic Love (2015)
- St Patrick's Day Songs for Songs (2015)
- Pirates vs. Dragons (2016)
- Name On My Soul (2017) with Kilted Kings
- Celtic Halloween EP (2017)
- As Long As I'm Flyin' (2018)
- Selcouth (2022)
- Come Adventure With Me (2024)
- Dancing With Hobbits (2024) with Dancing With Hobbits

In 2012, he contributed supporting vocals for the Worm Quartet song "Goddammit Marc Gunn, Shut Up About Your Cat" on the album Songs of the Maniacs.

See Brobdingnagian Bards for additional discography.

== Compilations produced and featured on ==
- Coventina's Well (2003)
- Secret World of Celtic Rock (2005)
- The Circle (2006) Hurricane Katrina benefit CD co-produced with Modern Bard
- Victims of Irish Music (2007)
- Renaissance Festival Podcast Compilation (2008)
- Best of the Irish & Celtic Music Podcast (2009)
- Best Irish Drinking Songs (2013)
- A Celtic Christmas (2014)
