= A Faire to Remember =

Studio album by Brobdingnagian Bards
- Released: September 1, 2001
- Label: Mage

Brobdingnagian Bards chronology
Songs of the Muse (2001)	A Faire to Remember (2001)	Songs of Ireland (2002)

A Faire to Remember is a mix of Renaissance Fair favorites, classic Celtic tunes, as well as some original comedic works from the Bards.

"If I Had a Million Ducats" is a parody of the Barenaked Ladies' hit song "If I Had $1000000". "Irish Ballad" is a cover of the song by satirist Tom Lehrer. Also, "Always Look on the Bright Side of Life" is an interpretation of the popular Monty Python song.

== Track listing ==
Source: Amazon

No.	Title	Length
1.	"The Mermaid Song"	3:24
2.	"Do Virgins Taste Better Medley"	4:50
3.	"Scarborough Faire"	5:53
4.	"Whiskey in the Jar"	3:01
5.	"Wild Mountain Thyme"	4:00
6.	"Health to the Company"	3:21
7.	"Wild Rover"	2:30
8.	"Johnny Jump Up"	3:31
9.	"The Scotsman"	2:16
10.	"Greensleeves Medley"	3:56
11.	"A Faire-ly Informative Interlude"	1:29
12.	"If I Had A Million Ducats"	3:23
13.	"Lusty Young Smith"	2:55
14.	"Donald, Where's Your Trousers/What Do You Do With A Drunken Sail"	3:51
15.	"Irish Ballad"	2:18
16.	"A Fairy Story"	1:50
17.	"Always Look on the Bright Side of Life"	3:07
