= Songs of Ireland (Brobdingnagian Bards album) =

Studio album by Brobdingnagian Bards
- Released: March 17, 2002
- Label: Mage

Brobdingnagian Bards chronology
A Faire to Remember (2001)	Songs of Ireland (2002)	Memories of Middle Earth (2003)

Songs of Ireland is an album by the Brobdingnagian Bards released on Saint Patrick's Day in 2002. Unlike the band's previous albums which featured songs of various Celtic origins, this album is a compilation of almost entirely Irish songs.

"The Unicorn Song" is a version of the poem by Shel Silverstein, recorded by The Irish Rovers in 1968. The Bards, however, added a final verse to the song, providing an alternate, happy ending to the tale of the extinction of unicorns.

== Track listing ==
1. "Rocky Road to Dublin"
2. "Rosin the Beau"
3. "Lish Young Buy-A-Broom"
4. "Johnny at the Door"
5. "An Irish Lullaby"
6. "Spancil Hill"
7. "Finnegan's Wake"
8. "Come Out Ye Black and Tans"
9. "Lanigan's Ball"
10. "Jug of Punch"
11. "Patriot Game"
12. "By the Rising of the Moon"
13. "The Unicorn Song"
14. "Satisfied"
15. "Join the British Army"
16. "Big Strong Man"
17. "Danny Boy"
18. "Paddy McCollough"
19. "Bog Down in the Valley"
