= Danny O'Flaherty =

Irish musician and storyteller

- Also known as: Danny O'Flaherty
- Born: Daniel O'Flaherty; March 5, 1951 (age 75); St. Paul, MN
- Genres: Celtic, folk
- Occupations: Musician, singer-songwriter
- Instruments: vocals, guitar, harmonica, accordion, lute
- Years active: 1967–present
- Formerly of: Celtic Folk, O'Flaherty Brothers and Norrie Arnott, The Irish Minstrels,
- Spouse: Lisa O'Flaherty (married 2013-present)
- Website: dannyoflaherty.com

Danny O’Flaherty is an Irish balladeer and Celtic folk musician.

== Life ==
Danny O'Flaherty (born March 5, 1951) is an Irish singer-songwriter, multi-instrumental musician and storyteller associated with Celtic and folk music. Raised in the Aran Islands and Connemara in the west of Ireland, O'Flaherty grew up in a traditional Irish-speaking community where music, song and oral storytelling remained an important part of social life.

His childhood included the custom of cuairtaíocht, or visiting, when neighbors gathered in one another's homes during the long winter evenings to tell stories, sing songs and make music around the fire. This tradition helped shape his lifelong interest in music, stories and customs of the west of Ireland.

== Career ==
After moving to the USA in 1970, O'Flaherty performed with a professional folk group known as "The Irish Minstrels," eventually performing around the country. He was influenced by the performances of Steve Goodman, Tommy Makem, Liam Clancy, and The New Christy Minstrels. O'Flaherty joined with his brother Patrick O'Flaherty to form The Celtic Folk in 1976. They performed mostly in Washington, D.C. On October 7, 1979 Danny performed a concert at Catholic University of America for the visit of Pope John Paul II.

In 1981, O'Flaherty performed at an inaugural ball for President Ronald Reagan and later that year he performed with The Celtic Folk at Solidarity Day in Washington, D.C. appearing on the steps of the U.S. Capitol before almost 500,000 people. During his years performing in the Washington, D.C. area, O'Flaherty appeared with The Celtic Folk at The National Press Club, one of several prominent venues the group performed at during that period.

In 1989 O'Flaherty and his brother Patrick opened O'Flaherty's Irish Channel Pub in New Orleans. The pub was located at 508 Toulouse Street in the French Quarter. The pub's Ballad Room featured live Celtic and folk music seven nights a week and hosted internationally known folk musicians, including Tommy Makem, Eric Bogle and Danny Doyle.

The venue also helped foster a new generation of New Orleans-Celtic musicians known as The Poor Clares who included members Betsy McGovern, Beth Patterson, Justin Murphy and Patrick O'Flaherty. The Ballad Room reflected O'Flaherty's roots in the west of Ireland, with a traditional currach suspended above the bar, alongside other reminders of Irish life and culture. In 2005 Hurricane Katrina hit the area and the pub closed. O'Flaherty evacuated to Texas, where he stayed after the storm.

O'Flaherty toured mainly as a solo act through first half of 2015, until October 15th when he was involved in an automobile accident in New Orleans. As a result of the injuries sustained, he was unable to perform regularly for 5 years. In August 2018 O'Flaherty released his album, "It's a Long Way From St. John's." The album chronicles the Royal Newfoundland Regiment in the First World War. .

In November 2019, O'Flaherty performed his first full live show in New Orleans at Esplanade Studios. O'Flaherty returned to touring in March 2020 but the mandated shutdowns resulting from the COVID-19 pandemic ended that tour. In early 2022 O'Flaherty returned to live performances in the southern USA including multiple live shows from Esplanade Studios in New Orleans. Since that time, O'Flaherty continues to perform across the United States and Canada. He also regularly returns to Ireland, leading music and cultural tours that introduces audiences to the places and traditions that shaped his own life and music, and hosts Irish-folk music cruises featuring performers, dancers and traditional events.

== Recordings ==
O'Flaherty has recorded numerous albums and has had songs featured in several films. He recorded the traditional song, "The Parting Glass," featured in Seeking Justice, a film starring Nicolas Cage. O'Flaherty's songwriting has also appeared in film. His song "Up With A Giggle" was featured in the 2021 film "The Eyes of Tammy Faye" where it was performed aby Academy Award-winning actress Jessica Chastain as part of the film's "puppet medley."

=== Discography ===
Solo Recordings / Albums:

- Every Child’s a Star
- Listen to the Wind
- The History of Ireland in Word and Song
- Heroes
- Farewell to John John
- Remember
- From The Heart
- An Irish Christmas Carol
- Spirit of Freedom
- He Believes in Me
- Secret Garden
- Long Way From St. John’s
- Changes
- Ceol na dTon
- Here Comes The Echo
- The Leprechaun Song (words and music Danny O’Flaherty) A Leprechaun’s St. Patrick’s Day by Sarah Kirwan Blazek Pelican Publishing/Books-on-Tape, 2000
- Donkey Cart Song Irish Night Before Christmas Pelican Publishing/Books-on-Tape, 2000
- The Monster Picnic (with Khaetidawne Quirke)
- The Blushing Bride (with Noel Nash)
- St. Patrick’s Day Anthem (with Noel Nash)
- Ride the Waves (with The Celtic Folk)
- Rainbow Flight (with The Celtic Folk)
- The Celtic Folk Live Volume I (with The Celtic Folk)
- The Celtic Folk Live Volume II (with The Celtic Folk)
- The Celtic Folk Live Volume III (with The Celtic Folk)
- The Celtic Folk Live Volume IV (with The Celtic Folk)
- Live on Bourbon Street (with The Celtic Folk)
- Looking West (with The Celtic Folk)

== Books ==
- Quirk, Khaetidawne; O'Flaherty, Danny (9 October 2000). The Loch Ness Monster's Story. Hy-Brasyl Productions. ISBN 0-9701957-0-2.
- Walker, Ted G; Walker, Danny G; O'Flaherty, Danny (25 April 2020). Danny O'Flaherty's Tears of Freedom. ISBN 978-1-5441-3402-4.

== Recognition ==
- 2011 Comhaltas Ceoltoiri Eireann Award - for commitment to the promotion and preservation of traditional Irish culture
- 2009 Just Plain Folks Award Nominee for Best Celtic CD and Best Celtic Song
- 2008 As Ucht Do Dhilscacht Don Iomramh Award - for lifetime achievement commitment to the preservation of the currach
- Voted one of the 2006 Top 100 Irish Americans – Irish American Magazine
- Irish Cultural Society Caomnuigteoir Award (Guardian of the Culture)
- 2005 Parents Choice Award for the Loch Ness Monster Story
