= The Whistling Gypsy =

"The Whistling Gypsy Rover"

Single by The Clancy Brothers and Tommy Makem

from the album A Spontaneous Performance Recording
- Genre: Irish folk music
- Label: Columbia
- Songwriter: Leo Maguire
- Producer: Bob Morgan

"The Whistling Gypsy", sometimes known simply as "The Gypsy Rover", is a well-known ballad composed and copyrighted by Dublin songwriter Leo Maguire in the 1950s.

There are a number of similar traditional songs about a well-off woman's encounter with Gypsies, dating back at least as far as the early 19th century, known as "The Raggle Taggle Gypsy", "The Raggle Taggle Gypsies", "The Gypsy Laddie", "Nine Yellow Gypsies", "Gypsie Davie" and "Black Jack Davie" (Roud #1, Child 200). The story-line usually revolves around a woman leaving her home and her "wedded lord" to run off with one or more Gypsies, to be pursued by her husband. Dorothy Scarborough's 1937 book A Song Catcher In Southern Mountains: American Folk Songs of British Ancestry includes a lullaby called "Gypsy Davy", which Scarborough collected from two Virginia women who had learned the song from their respective grandmothers who in turn had learned it in Ireland. Scarborough's "Gypsy Davy" has a similar construction to Maguire's song, both in some of the lyrics in the verses and in the "ah dee do" chorus that does not appear in the other aforementioned Gypsy-themed songs. However, in Maguire's song the lady is pursued by her father, and when he catches the pair the "Gypsy" reveals himself to be the "lord of these lands all over".

The song was first recorded by Joe Lynch in Dublin on the Glenside label, which had been set up by Martin Walton in 1952. It was popularised throughout the country by airplay on the Walton's Programme on Radio Éireann, also established by Walton in that year. Another early recording was by Rose Brennan, for His Master's Voice in London, in October 1953. In 1954 Rose Brennan's cover was awarded third place by the New Musical Express for the best recording of the year. Later that year it was selected as the title tune for the film The Black Knight, starring Alan Ladd and Patricia Medina. For this purpose it was given new lyrics by Maguire and Elton Hayes, who sang it in the film.

Since then it has been recorded by numerous artists, including The Corries (who were at that time known as the Corrie Folk Trio), Carmel Quinn, The Clancy Brothers and Tommy Makem, The Kingston Trio, The Chad Mitchell Trio, The Highwaymen (who had a minor hit single with the song), The Limeliters, The Seekers, Foster & Allen and The Wiggles.
