= The Holy Ground =

Traditional Irish folk song

"The Holy Ground" is a traditional Irish folk song, performed by The Clancy Brothers, The Dubliners, The Jolly Rogers, the Poxy Boggards, the Brobdingnagian Bards, Mary Black, Pete Seeger, The Tossers, The Mary Wallopers and Beatnik Turtle, among others.

John Loesberg points out that although the song is now closely associated with Cobh in Co Cork, it probably originated in Wales where it was known as Old Swansea Town Once More, or sometimes as The Lass of Swansea Town.

Robert Gogan describes how the song was a sea shanty sung by sailors as a mental diversion as they carried out various tasks at sea such as raising the anchor.
