= The Clancy Brothers and Tommy Makem (album) =

The Clancy Brothers & Tommy Makem

Studio album by The Clancy Brothers and Tommy Makem
- Released: 1961
- Recorded: Daniel Hancock
- Genre: Irish folk music
- Length: 34:33
- Label: Tradition
- Producer: Patrick Clancy

The Clancy Brothers and Tommy Makem chronology
Come Fill Your Glass with Us (1959)	The Clancy Brothers & Tommy Makem (1961)	A Spontaneous Performance Recording (1961)

Professional ratings
Review scores
Source	Rating
Allmusic	link

The Clancy Brothers & Tommy Makem is a collection of traditional Irish songs performed by The Clancy Brothers with frequent collaborator Tommy Makem. It was their third album and their final one for Tradition Records, the small label that the eldest Clancy brother Paddy Clancy ran. After this, the group recorded exclusively for Columbia Records until 1970. This was the first album for which they used the group name, The Clancy Brothers and Tommy Makem. Their prior recordings had simply listed their individual names on the cover.

== Chart performance ==
The album debuted on Billboard magazine's Top LP's chart in the issue dated November 16, 1963, peaking at No. 60 during a twelve-week run on the chart.

== Reception ==
Billboard Magazine awarded the album four stars and praised the Clancy Brothers and Tommy Makem for singing and playing Irish folk music "with much authority and feeling." In the reviewer's opinion, the songs on the album were "all sparkling with Irish wit and emotion."

In a specialized review of folk albums, D. K. Wilgus complimented the album for retaining a "ring of honesty" in authentically presenting Irish folk songs while suggesting that the record also strove too much to emphasize the "'felt beauty' or the meaning of the material." He singled out Liam Clancy's solo on "The Bold Tenant Farmer" for praise.

After Liam Clancy died in 2009, The Times of London noted that this album showed the Clancys and Makem "as assured and consummate performers, with Liam's dramatic style making his the strongest voice of all."

== Track listing ==
All songs are traditional, except noted otherwise

=== Side one ===
1. "Brennan on the Moor"
2. "The Work of the Weavers"
3. "The Stuttering Lovers"
4. "Paddy Doyle's Boots"
5. "The Maid of Fife-E-O"
6. "The Bard of Armagh"
7. "The Jug of Punch"
8. "Roddy McCorley" (Ethna Carbery)

=== Side two ===
1. "The Barnyards of Delgaty"
2. "The Castle Of Dromore"
3. "The Bold Tenant Farmer"
4. "Ballinderry"
5. "Bungle Rye"
6. "Eileen Aroon"
7. "Johnny I Hardly Knew You" (Joseph B. Geoghegan)

== Personnel ==
- Paddy Clancy – vocals, harmonica
- Tom Clancy – vocals
- Liam Clancy – vocals, guitar
- Tommy Makem – vocals, tin whistle
- Bruce Langhorne – guitar
- Eric Darling – banjo

== Charts ==
Chart (1963)	Peak position
US Billboard Top LPs	60
