= Johnston's Motor Car =

Irish rebel song

"Johnston's Motor Car" is an Irish rebel song written by Willie Gillespie based on the commandeering in Ulster of a motor car belonging to Dr. Henry Maturin Johnston (1851–1932) by the Irish Republican Army (IRA).

== History ==
The song is based on a real event in April 1921. An Irish Republican Army unit needed transport to a town over fifty miles away, but had no car to carry them. They decided to call out Henry M. Johnston, a doctor based in Stranorlar, and then ambush him and his car at a bridge and commandeer the car for the IRA. Johnston was sent a telegraph asking him to attend to a Mrs Boyle. On his way there, he found the Reelin Bridge in Glenfin barricaded by the IRA, who forced him to give them his car. In 2019, retired Ballybofey businessman Cathal McHugh claimed to have found what he believes to be the remnants of the vehicle under a peat stack in County Donegal.

== Composition ==
William Gillespie, a poet from Ballybofey, wrote the song shortly after the event. The song was very popular in Ireland in the 1920s before being rediscovered and covered by bands including The Dubliners and Flying Column, although the more modern versions have slightly different lyrics; Johnston is often replaced with Johnson as well, as in the Clancy Brothers version.

== Original Lyrics ==
Down by Brockagh Corner one morning I did stray,
When I met another rebel bold, who this to me did say:
I've orders from the Captain to assemble at Drumbar
But how are we to reach Dungloe without a Motor Car?

O Barney dear, be of good cheer and I'll tell you what we'll do.
The Black and Tans have plenty guns altho' we have but few.
We'll wire down to Stranorlar before we walk so far,
And we'll give the boys a jolly ride on Johnston's Motor Car.

When Johnston got the wire then he soon pulled on his shoes.
He says this case is urgent, there's little time to lose.
He wore a fancy caster hat and on his breast a star.
You could hear the din going through Glenfin of Johnston's Motor Car.

When he came to the Reelan Bridge, he met some rebels there.
He knew the game was up with him, and at them he did stare.
He said I've got a permit for travelling out so far
You can keep your English permit, but we want your motor car.

"What will my loyal comrades say when I get to Drumboe.
To say my car was commandeered by rebels from Dungloe?"
We'll give you a receipt for her, its signed by Captain Maher,
And when Ireland's free, then we will see to Johnston's Motor Car.

They put the car in motion, they filled it to the brim.
With guns and bayonets shining, while Johnston he did grin.
When Barney waved a Sinn Féin flag, she shot off like a star
And they gave three cheers for freedom and for Johnston's Motor Car.

When the loyal crew they heard the news, it grieved their hearts full sore.
They swore they'd have reprisals before they would give o'er.
In vain they searched through Glenties, the Rosses and Kilcar,
While the I.R.A. their flags displayed on Johnston's Motor Car.

== Popular Lyrics ==
'Twas down by Brannigan's Corner, one morning I did stray
I met a fellow rebel, and to me he did say
"We've orders from the captain to assemble at Drumbar
But how are we to get there, without a motor car?"

"Oh, Barney dear, be of good cheer, I'll tell you what we'll do
The Specials they are plentiful and the IRA are few
We'll send a wire to Johnston to meet us at Stranorlar
And we'll give the boys a bloody good ride in Johnston's Motor Car.

When Doctor Johnston heard the news he soon put on his shoes
He says this is an urgent case, there is no time to lose
He then put on his castor hat and on his breast a star
You could hear the din all through Glenfin of Johnston's motor car.

But when he got to the railway bridge, some rebels he saw there
Old Johnston knew the game was up, for at him they did stare
He said "I have a permit, to travel near and far"
"To hell with your English permit, we want your motor car."

"What will my loyal brethren think, when they hear the news
My car it has been commandeered, by the rebels at Dunluce?"
"We'll give you a receipt for it, all signed by Captain Barr
And when Ireland gets her freedom, you'll get your motor car."

Well we put that car in motion and filled it to the brim
With guns and bayonets shining which made old Johnston grim
And Barney hoisted a Sinn Féin flag, and it fluttered like a star
And we gave three cheers for the IRA and Johnston's Motor Car.

== Recordings ==
- The Clancy Brothers, In Person at Carnegie Hall (1963)
- Dominic Behan, Easter Week and after (1965)
- The Dubliners, Plain and Simple (1973)
- The Flying Column, Four Green Fields (1972)
- Renaud, Molly Malone – Balade irlandaise (2009) - A French translation
