= Brobdingnagian Bards =

The Brobdingnagian Bards are a Celtic music group from Austin, Texas, United States.

== History ==
Marc Gunn, formerly of Austin Texas' alternative rock bands Skander and Breastfed, released a solo album (Geography) featuring himself on autoharp and Andrew McKee on recorder in 1998. This initial collaboration lead to the official formation of the Brobdingnagian Bards in 1999.

The group's name is derived from Brobdingnag, the kingdom of coarse giants described in Jonathan Swift's satirical novel Gulliver's Travels. The band was made up of its original two members, Marc Gunn (autoharp, vocals), and Andrew McKee (recorder, mandolin, vocals).

The Brobdingnagian Bards musical style is best described as a mixture of Irish and Scottish folk music, with their original compositions often falling into the filk genre. Although the pair did perform a good deal of purely traditional songs, the band is most well known for their original works, including comedic pop-culture and sci-fi-themed parodies. Despite performing in a niche genre, this duo was ranked as one of the top 20 bands on the original MP3.com. Over time, the Bards also honed their act into live entertainment by adding comedy, with McKee being the "straight-man" to Gunn's antics. As a result, they also became a familiar and popular act on both the renaissance faire and geek-show circuits.

The Bards had the honor of being headliners at the Oscar party for The Lord of the Rings: The Return of the King. Both performers are from Austin, Texas, and have made regular appearances in the Austin Chronicle's annual Austin Music Awards poll; they earned the #1 prize for "Best Novelty Band" in 2004, "Best None of the Above" performing band in 2006 (the first Celtic band to ever win such accolades), and "Best Folk Act" in 2007. The band has also made regular top-ten finishes in the folk band and world music categories. In 2002, the Bards were also given a critic's pick award for "Best Renaissance Men" in the 2002 Best of Austin awards.

In addition to the many conventions, fairs and music festivals the group performed at around the Austin area, they also have toured coast to coast, and developed a following of devoted listeners, referred to as "Nagians." In 2007 and 2008, the Bards with several of their fans took a vacation tour of Ireland.

On September 15, 2008, the Brobdingnagian Bards band broke up amicably in order to pursue solo careers. They played one of their last public performances at The Browncoat Ball, organized by the Austin Browncoats.

The Bards reformed in 2012, performing at the Sherwood Celtic Music Festival near Austin and have continued to work together off and on since.

The Bards performed at DragonCon in Atlanta, GA in August 2013, 2016 and 2018.

== Discography ==
- Marked by Great Size (1999)
- Gullible's Travels (2000)
- Songs of the Muse (2001)
- A Faire to Remember (2001)
- Songs of Ireland (2002)
- Memories of Middle Earth (2003)
- A Celtic Renaissance Wedding (2004) (Compilation)
- Brobdingnagian Fairy Tales (2005)
- Christmas in Brobdingnag, Vol 1 (2005)
- The Holy Grail of Irish Drinking Songs (2006) (Compilation)
- LIVE: Nex Monoceroti, Per Risibus (2007)
- Real Men Wear Kilts (2008)
- Dragons and Virgins (2017)
- I Will Not Sing Along (2020)
- Another Faire to Remember (2023)
