= Denise Kelly =

Irish harpist and composer (born 1954)

Denise Kelly (born 24 April 1954) is an Irish harpist and composer. She was born in Belfast, Northern Ireland, and was educated at the Royal Irish Academy and at Trinity College, Dublin, where she graduated with a Master of Music degree. She studied composition with Robert Barclay Wilson and James Wilson, and also studied harp and composition at the Guildhall School of Music and Drama in London with Sidonie Goossens.

== Works ==
Selected works include:

- Helas mon Dieu for mezzo, flute and harp (1974)
- Journey of a Soul for voice and harp, setting from Joyce (1977)
- Dialog to Unity for flute, harp and string quartet (1978)
- Idle Dreams for mezzo, flute and harp (1980)
- Soundings for cello and harp (1984)
