= Aililiu na Gamhna =

Irish folk song

“Aliliú na Gamhna” is an Irish folk song, simply translated as “Ah, the calves” or “Hurray! The heifers”. The word aililiú means “hallelujah”, with a similar connotation of praise or joy, and gamhna are heifers - young cows that are not yet in milk. It is a Munster song.

== Premise and history ==
The story of this song is told from the perspective of a young woman, daughter of a herd or farmer (it declares in the first verse “I am a herd's daughter, no doubt”). She reminisces about her youth spent living near a lake, in a cottage, caring for her cows and their offspring. She remembers the cows being called to the barn at night, playing in the morning on the grass, and how she used to milk them. The end of the song makes mention of going to a fair to look at or buy calves, and how they would be given the finest pastures (“the tufts of gorse”) to graze before coming home at the end of summer. (This is a reference to the practice of booleying, or transhumance, which was traditional in Ireland; the young cattle were brought to the hills by the adolescents, who would stay and party before leaving them to graze the sweet highland grass for the summer. The song was a favourite of Thomas MacDonagh.

According to several Irish song books, it is related to a song called Na Gamhna Geala, where a woman similarly laments her idyllic youth and the “country life” she once lived, tending to her cattle, after moving away and getting married. The song may have come about by the early 17th century. There are, likely, other traditional songs that could be related to this one—thematically, lyrically and melodically—, originating from Ireland, as well as further afield in the Celtic nations of the British Isles, as well as Brittany, Galicia, etc.

Seoladh na Gamhna tells of a girl or woman trying to find her missing cows, but the exact narrative varies.

There is a Scottish Waulking song called ’S e mo gràdh na gamhna geala, which also has gone by the name Na gamhna geala. The first set of lyrics is apparently missing and some references do not seem clear. In the known lyrics, a group of sea raiders are praised and in part of the passage, it appears to tell which raiders died while on the voyage to Ireland.

== Lyrics ==
Is iníon d’aoire mé féinig gan amhras
A bhíodh ina chónaí cois taobh na Leamhna
Bhí bothán agam féin ann is fuinneog i gceann de
Fad a bhíodh an bainne ag téamh agam, se ghlaofainn ar na gamhna

Curfá (Chorus):
Aililiú, na gamhna, na gamhna bána
Aililiú, na gamhna; na gamhna, b’iad a b’fhearr liom.
Aililiú, na gamhna; na gamhna geala bána
Na gamhna maidin shamraidh, ag damhsa ar na bánta

Faightear dom canna ‘s faightear dom bhúruach
Faightear dom soitheach ina gcuirfead mo chuid uachtair
Ceolta si na cruinne bheith á síorchur i m'chluasa
Ba bhinne liomsa géimneach na mbó ag teacht chun baile

Rachaimid ar an aonach is ceannóimid gamhna
‘S cuirfimid ar féarach iad amach ins na gleannta
Íosfaidh siad an féar is barr an aitinn gallda
‘S tiocfaidh siad a’bhaile chun an bhainne i gcomhair an tsamhraidh

English translation:
I am a shepherd's daughter, undoubtedly
Who used to live beside the cliffs of Leamhna
I had a cabin and a window there
When the milk was warming, I would call the cows

Chorus:
Ah, the calves, the beautiful calves
Ah, the calves, I loved them most of all
Ah, the calves, the sweet, lovely calves
The sweet calves dancing on the meadow

Chorus:
Fetch me a can or fetch me a spancel
Fetch me a vessel to hold the cream
The music of the world fills my ears and is always around me
But sweeter to me the lowing of the cows coming home

Chorus:
Let us go to the fair and buy calves
We can put them to graze out in the glens
They'll eat the finest grass and the gorse
And they'll come home to milk in summer.

== Recordings ==
A modern-traditional version of this song was released in 1997 by the Irish-American band Solas on their sophomore album Sunny Spells and Scattered Showers (Shanachie Records). The lyrics are sung by vocalist Karan Casey, with Seamus Egan on low whistle, John Doyle on guitar, Winifred Horan on fiddle, and John Williams on button accordion. It is a standard track, also recorded by Iarla Ó Lionáird, Séamus Begley and others.
