= Finnegan's Wake (song) =

Irish-American comic ballad

"Finnegan's Wake" (Roud 1009) is an Irish-American comic folk ballad, first published in New York in 1864. Various 19th-century variety theatre performers, including Dan Bryant of Bryant's Minstrels, claimed authorship but a definitive account of the song's origin has not been established. An earlier popular song, John Brougham's "A Fine Ould Irish Gintleman," also included a verse in which an apparently dead alcoholic was revived by the power of whiskey.

In more recent times, "Finnegan's Wake" was a staple of the Irish folk-music group the Dubliners, who played it on many occasions and included it on several albums, and is especially well known to fans of the Clancy Brothers, who performed and recorded it with Tommy Makem. The song has been recorded by Irish-American Celtic punk band Dropkick Murphys.

== Summary ==
In the ballad, the hod-carrier Tim Finnegan, born "with a love for the liquor", falls from a ladder, breaks his skull, and is thought to be dead. The mourners at his wake become rowdy, and spill whiskey over Finnegan's corpse, causing him to come back to life and join in the celebrations. Whiskey causes both Finnegan's fall and his resurrection—whiskey is derived from the Irish phrase uisce beatha (pronounced [ˈɪʃcə ˈbʲahə]), meaning "water of life".

== Hiberno-English phrases and terms ==
- brogue (an Irish or Scottish accent)
- hod (a tool to carry bricks in) (Slang term for a tankard or drinking vessel)
- tippler's way (a tippler is a drunkard)
- craythur (craythur is colloquially used in Ireland, especially in the North, as referring to someone, or something, for whom one should have sympathy, or to which one should extend some affection. It can also refer to poteen (Poitín); "a drop of the craythur" is an expression to have some poteen)
- Whack fol the dah (non-lexical vocalsinging called "lilting"; see Scat singing and mouth music. It is also punned upon repeatedly by James Joyce as Whack 'fol the Danaan'.)
- trotters (feet)
- full (drunk)
- mavourneen (my darling)
- hould your gob (shut up)
- belt in the gob (punch in the mouth)
- Shillelagh law (a brawl)
- ruction (a fight)
- bedad (an expression of shock)

Non-English phrases:

- Thanam 'on dhoul (Irish: D'anam 'on diabhal, "your soul to the devil") However, in other versions of the song, Tim says "Thunderin' Jaysus."

== Use in literature ==
The song is famous for providing the basis of James Joyce's final work, Finnegans Wake (1939), in which the comic resurrection of Tim Finnegan is employed as a symbol of the universal cycle of life. As whiskey, the "water of life", causes both Finnegan's death and resurrection in the ballad, so the word "wake" also represents both a passing (into death) and a rising (from sleep), not to mention the wake of the lifeship traveling in between. Joyce removed the apostrophe in the title of his novel to suggest an active process in which a multiplicity of "Finnegans", that is, all members of humanity, fall and then wake and arise.

"Finnegan's Wake" is featured at the climax of the primary storyline in Philip José Farmer's award-winning novella, Riders of the Purple Wage.

== Recordings ==
Many bands have performed Finnegan's Wake including notably:

- The Clancy Brothers on several of their albums, including Come Fill Your Glass with Us (1959), A Spontaneous Performance Recording (1961), Recorded Live in Ireland (1965), and the 1984 Reunion concert at Lincoln Center.
- The Dubliners on several live albums.
- Dropkick Murphys on their albums Do or Die and Live on St. Patrick's Day From Boston, MA.
- The High Kings on their albums Memory Lane and Live in Ireland
- Sheridan Rúitín on their 2022 studio album Rebels in the Night
