= Come Fill Your Glass with Us =

Studio album by The Clancy Brothers and Tommy Makem
- Released: 1959; Reissue 1998
- Genre: Irish folk music
- Length: 36:56
- Label: Tradition

The Clancy Brothers and Tommy Makem chronology
The Rising of the Moon (1959)	Come Fill Your Glass with Us (1959)	The Clancy Brothers & Tommy Makem (1961)

Professional ratings
Review scores
Source	Rating
Allmusic	link

Come Fill Your Glass with Us: Irish Songs of Drinking & Blackguarding is a collection of traditional Irish drinking songs that first brought The Clancy Brothers and their frequent collaborator Tommy Makem to prominence. It was their second album and was released in 1959 by Tradition Records, a small music label run by one of the Clancy Brothers, Paddy Clancy. A reviewer for the folk and world music magazine, Dirty Linen, later called this the album that "launched the Clancy Brothers to fame in the Americas and helped launch a revival of interest in traditional Irish music."

== Reception ==
Billboard Magazine rated the album with four stars. After describing the Clancys and Makem as "a group of Irish actors," the review praised "this authentic sounding, alternately exuberant and wistful, collection of Irish drinking songs." It also called Jack Keenan's instrumental backing "effective."

Robert Shelton in The New York Times, noting that the Clancys and Makem had yet to pick a professional name for themselves, suggested that "this group of Irish-American actor-singers" could "perk up our juke boxes and air waves" with their songs. Other backup singers joining in created the "effect of an Irish Republican Army battalion having itself a time in a pub" in his opinion. (The future name of the group, The Clancy Brothers and Tommy Makem, was added to later re-issues of the album.)

Professor of Folklore Kenneth Goldstein, who periodically worked for Tradition Records, called the album "sparkling." Stressing that the singers were real Irishmen, he asserted that "a finer bunch of voices never raised a glass and a song together."

== Track listing ==
=== Disc one ===
1. "Whiskey You're the Devil" – 2:31
2. "The Maid of the Sweet Brown Knowe" – 2:52
3. "The Moonshiner" – 3:12
4. "Bold Thady Quill" – 2:37
5. "Rosin the Bow" – 3:31
6. "Finnigin's Wake" – 2:19
7. "The Real Old Mountain Dew" – 1:11

=== Disc two ===
1. "Courting in the Kitchen" – 3:35
2. "Mick McGuire" – 2:40
3. "A Jug of Punch" – 3:37
4. "Johnny McEldoo" – 1:43
5. "Cruiscin Lan" – 2:11
6. "Portlairge" – 1:19
7. "The Parting Glass" – 2:35

== Personnel ==
- Patrick Clancy - vocals, harmonica
- Tom Clancy - vocals
- Liam Clancy - vocals, guitar (in the last track)
- Tommy Makem - vocals, tin whistle
- Jack Keenan - guitar, banjo
