= The Moonshiner =

Folk song with unknown origins

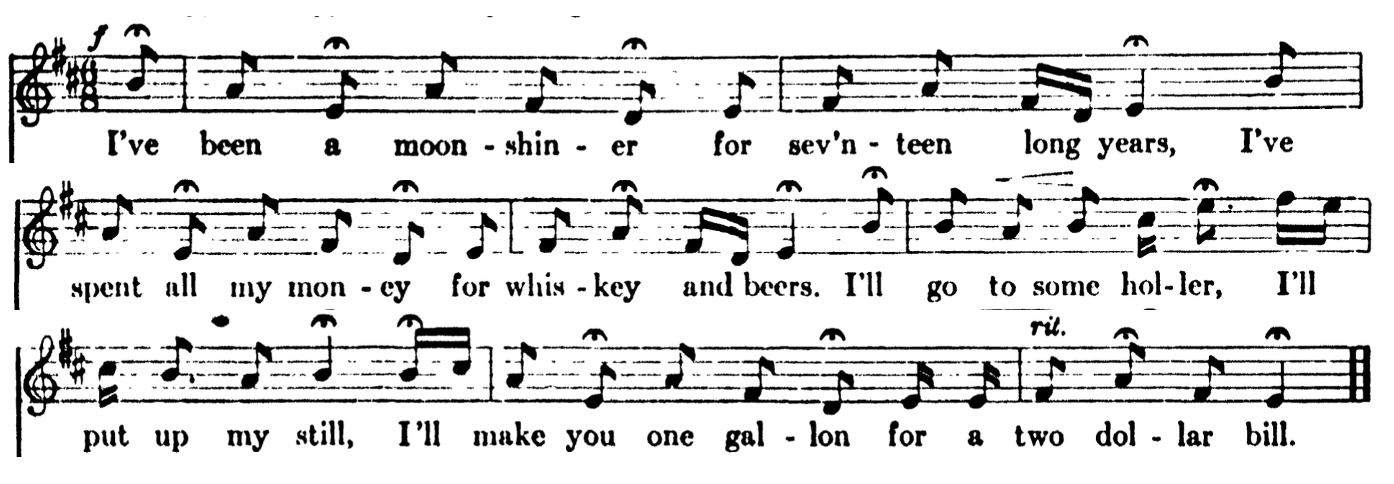
The melody printed in Carl Sandburg's The American Songbag (1927).

"The Moonshiner" is a folk song with unknown origins. In Ireland and America, it is sung with similar lyrics but different melodies. It is catalogued as Roud Folk Song Index No. 4301. The song's structure is very similar to The Wild Rover, but instead extolling the virtues of moonshining.

== History ==
The composers of the Irish and American melodies for "The Moonshiner" are unknown. Most evidence points to it being an American lyric that became popular in Ireland when sung to a much different tune. The text borrows phrases from several well-known English songs, yet it follows the American tradition of glorifying moonshiners as folk heroes during Prohibition. The most explicit praise of their bootlegging comes in the blessing of the moonshiners, which is often omitted in American performances. The usage of "moonshine" instead of "poitín" suggests that the song may have originated in America. However, there is no definitive proof of the song's provenance.

Irish actor Liam Redmond believed it was an "American drinking song". The song was a staple for Delia Murphy throughout her career. She recorded it for His Master's Voice in 1939, and it was released the following year. The Clancy Brothers and Tommy Makem recorded it in 1959 for their second album, Come Fill Your Glass with Us. Their recording of the song increased its popularity in Ireland, where it remains more familiar than in America. Makem directly credited Delia Murphy with introducing the song to Irish audiences. The reverse emigration of the song is fairly unique.

The Irish version of the tune is in a major key with triple meter, and its melody differs entirely from the American version. It is unclear how Delia Murphy came to pair this tune with "The Moonshiner" lyrics.

Carl Sandburg included the song as "Kentucky Moonshiner" in The American Songbag. He found the song in the collection of another folklorist named Gilbert Combs, a Methodist Episcopal minister in Lexington, Kentucky. Sandburg prints an arrangement of the melody by Alfred George Wathall, who scored it in the Dorian mode.

In The Folk Songs of North America, Alan Lomax arranges the tune in D minor and retains the triple time of the Irish melody, even though most of his field recordings are in a quadruple meter. He identifies three different lyrical sources for "Moonshiner": "The Wagoner", "Rye Whiskey", and "I'm Troubled". Lomax cites the work of Frank Brown, whose discussions of these tunes stresses that folk lyrics are often composites of several different songs. Brown also traces the usage of the "I'll eat when I'm hungry" phrase back to the 18th century.

== Recordings ==
On September 11, 1937 in Botto, Kentucky, Alan and Elizabeth Lomax recorded Dawson Henson performing "The Moonshiner" on guitar. They recorded Ken Begley performing "The Moonshiner Song" in Hell for Certain, Kentucky on October 1 of the same year.

Bob Dylan performed the song at The Gaslight Cafe at least twice, beginning in 1962. He recorded "Moonshiner" in 1963. His version was not released until The Bootleg Series Volumes 1-3 (Rare & Unreleased) 1961-1991. While Dylan's performance bears resemblance to the 1930s recordings of Henson and Buell Kazee, it is most similar to the 1959 recording by Rolf Cahn, who added the "whole world's a bottle" coda. Dylan called it "The Bottle Song". Greil Marcus enthused that the vocal performance is "among the best Bob has ever recorded", and he lamented, "It would have been good to have had this song around a few years ago when people complained that Dylan couldn’t sing." Cat Power described Dylan's cover as a palliative, "...it validated my pain, and listening somehow took the pain away. 'Moonshiner' was the softest bed I could ever lie on."

The song has also been performed and recorded by Elliott Smith, Cat Power, Rumbleseat, Cast Iron Filter, Jalan Crossland, Peter Rowan, Railroad Earth, Bob Forrest, Roscoe Holcomb, Uncle Tupelo, Jeffrey Foucault, The Tallest Man On Earth, Tim Hardin, Charlie Parr, Punch Brothers, Redbird, Robert Francis, Scorpios, Sam Shackleton, Dave Van Ronk, əkoostik hookah, Moriarty, Clay Parker & Jodi James, Lost Dog Street Band, David Bromberg, and Parsonsfield.

In the movie Deliverance, actor/musician Ronny Cox plays and sings the "religion when I die" stanza on his acoustic guitar around the first night's campfire.

== Lyrics ==
American

I've been a moonshiner for sev'nteen long years
I've spent all my money for whiskey and beers.
I'll go to some holler, I'll put up my still
I'll make you one gallon for a two-dollar bill.

I'll go to some grocery and drink with my friends,
No woman to follow to see what I spends.
God bless those pretty women, I wish they were mine,
Their breath smells as sweet as the dew on the vine.

I'll eat when I'm hungry and drink when I'm dry,
If moonshine don't kill me, I'll live till I die.
God bless those moonshiners, I wish they were mine,
Their breath smells as sweet as the dew on the vine.

Irish

I've been a moonshiner for many a year
And I've spent all me money on whiskey and beer
I'll go to some hollow and I'll set up my still
And I'll make you a gallon for a ten shilling bill

(Chorus)
I'm a rambler, I'm a gambler,
I'm a long way from home
And if you don't like me
You can leave me alone
I'll eat when I'm hungry
And I'll drink when I'm dry
And if moonshine don't kill me
I'll live till I die

I'll go to some hollow in this country
Ten gallons of wash and I'll go on a spree
No woman to follow and the world is all mine
I love none so well as I love the moonshine

Moonshine dear moonshine oh how I love thee
You killed my poor father but dare you kill me
Bless all moonshiners and bless all moonshine
For their breath smells as sweet as the dew on the vine
