= The Juice of the Barley =

Traditional Irish drinking song

"The Juice of the Barley" is a traditional Irish drinking song from around the mid-19th century. The Clancy Brothers, as well as several other bands have made recordings, and popular dance renditions of the song.

The phrase "bainne na mbó ar na gamhna" in the chorus is Irish, and means "Cows' milk for the calves".

Because most of the people who sing this song don't know a single word of Irish, and they usually learn it by hearing it (as is normal in the oral tradition) rather than seeing it in writing, the first line of the chorus exists in many strange forms. There are also several versions of the English verses.
