= Leo Maguire =

Irish singer and songwriter (1903–1985)

Patrick Leo Maguire (1903 – 17 December 1985) was an Irish singer, songwriter, and radio broadcaster.

Born in Dublin's inner city, Maguire trained as a baritone under Vincent O'Brien, John McCormack's voice teacher. For many years he performed with the Dublin Operatic Society.

Maguire was a prolific composer, writing over 100 songs. These include "Come to the Céile", "The Old Killarney Hat", "If You'll Only Come Across the Seas to Ireland", "The Dublin Saunter" (which he wrote for Noel Purcell) and "Eileen McManus" (recorded by Daniel O'Donnell). His most famous song is "The Whistling Gypsy". In 1954 Rose Brennan was awarded third place by the New Musical Express for the best recording of the year for her cover of "The Whistling Gypsy". It was also a hit in Ireland and later in the United States. Maguire also wrote parodies and humorous songs under the name Sylvester Gaffney.

In parallel with his musical career, Maguire worked as a broadcaster on Radio Éireann. The programme with which he is most closely associated is the Walton's Programme. This was a weekly sponsored show during which Maguire played recordings of popular Irish ballads. He finished each show with the catchphrase "if you feel like singing, do sing an Irish song." The programme was broadcast for almost 30 years until its cancellation in January 1981.
