= Willy Brennan =

Irish highwayman (died 1804, 1809, or 1812)

William "Willy" Brennan was an Irish highwayman caught and hanged in Cork in either 1804 1809 or 1812, whose story was immortalised in the ballad "Brennan on the Moor".

According to The Reminiscences of a Light Dragoon, a work of historical fiction by George Gleig, published in 1840, Brennan was hanged at Caher as witnessed by the narrator. Whilst no date is mentioned for the hanging, the (fictional) author arrived in Ireland in 1808 or shortly afterwards, making an 1809 or later date for Brennan's demise more realistic. The reminiscences describe some of Brennan's exploits, his character, his partner-in-crime and ultimately his capture, trial and hanging.

== "Brennan on the Moor" ==
The earliest version of the ballad dates to the middle 19th century, either the 1830s or to 1859, and various versions of the song were extant in Ireland, Great Britain, Canada and the United States in the 19th century. The song's writer is unknown. It has been recorded by Burl Ives, The Clancy Brothers and Tommy Makem, Philip James, Neil Morris, and The Marshmen.

"Rambling, Gambling Willie," a song by Bob Dylan with a melody derived from "Brennan on the Moor" (which Dylan had first heard performed by his friends the Clancy Brothers), but with completely different lyrics, was recorded by Dylan in April 1962, intended for the album The Freewheelin' Bob Dylan. It was not included on that album, but was released in 1991 on The Bootleg Series Volumes 1–3.
