= The Rising of the Moon =

Irish ballad

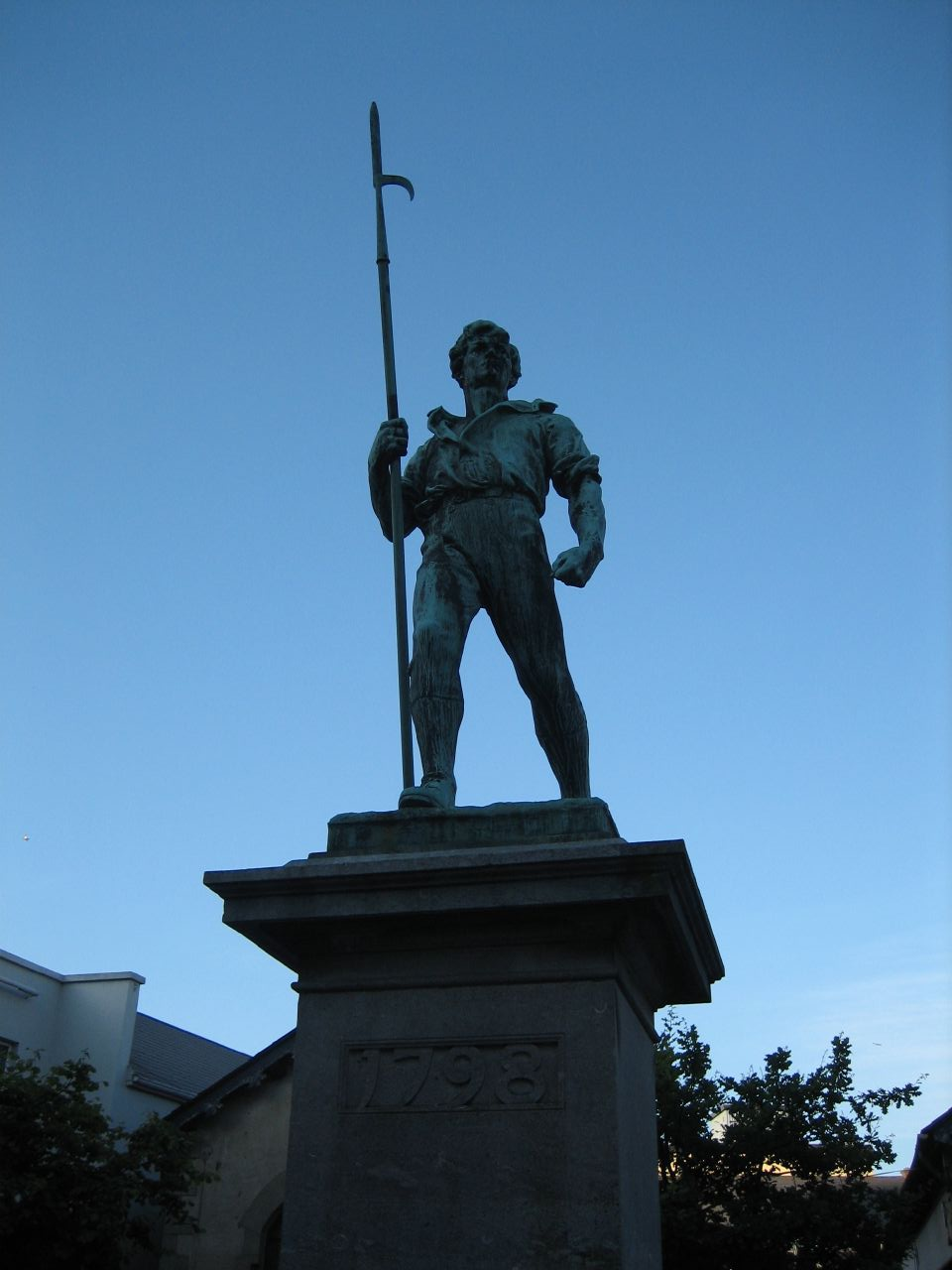
A rebel with a pike

"The Rising of the Moon" is an Irish ballad recounting a battle between the United Irishmen, led by Wolfe Tone, against British forces during the Irish Rebellion of 1798.

== Description ==
The ballad's singer is told that the "pikes must be together at the rising of the moon" to engage in the rebellion. The pikemen gather, but are defeated by the government forces. Despite the loss, the listener is told that there are those who will "follow in their footsteps" to again revolt against British rule in Ireland.

The ballad has taken the tune of another Irish ballad, "The Wearing of the Green", and was first published in John Keegan Casey's 1866 collection of poems and songs, A Wreath of Shamrocks. The lyrics were written by Casey (1846–70), the "Fenian Poet", who based the poem on the failed 1798 uprising in Granard, County Longford.

The ballad has been in circulation since circa 1865. The earliest verifiable date found in publication is 1867.

The ballad refers to the outbreak of the 1798 rebellion, as United Irish rebels convey the order to rise. The air of hope and optimism associated with the ultimately doomed rebellion was intended to provide inspiration for rebels preparing to take to the field in another ill-fated venture, the Fenian rebellion of 1867.

Multiple variants of the lyrics have been published in folk music collections. In the late 19th century, the ballad was also published through the printing of broadsides.

The song remains popular and the tune is widely recognised in Ireland today, as it is often taught in schools, played regularly at official and sporting events, and has been covered by a wide variety of musicians, including The 97th Regimental String Band, The Dubliners, The Clancy Brothers, The High Kings, Tommy Makem, Shane MacGowan, Tia Blake, Barry McGuire, Terry and the Pirates, Peter, Paul and Mary.
