= New England Music Awards =

Annual awards show for artists from New England

- Awarded for: Outstanding achievements or contributions to the regional music industry.
- Country: United States
- First award: 2012
- Website: nemusicawards.com

The New England Music Awards are an annual award show. Bands and artists from the New England region of the United States are eligible for receipt of the awards.

== Nomination process ==
Recipients are selected through their recordings, appearances and reputation. The awards were created by music promoter Joe Graham and Sugarpop Records label executive Dennis Hennessey in 2011, and the first ceremony occurred in 2012. The nominating committee consists of music journalists, radio personalities, record label executives and talent scouts. Event coordinator Mike Flynn says "when you take New England as a whole and look at all the amazing music and talent that's out there, it's mind blowing," adding "putting that talent together under one roof also helps some artists get recognition that they might not have had before."

== History ==
=== 2012 awards ===
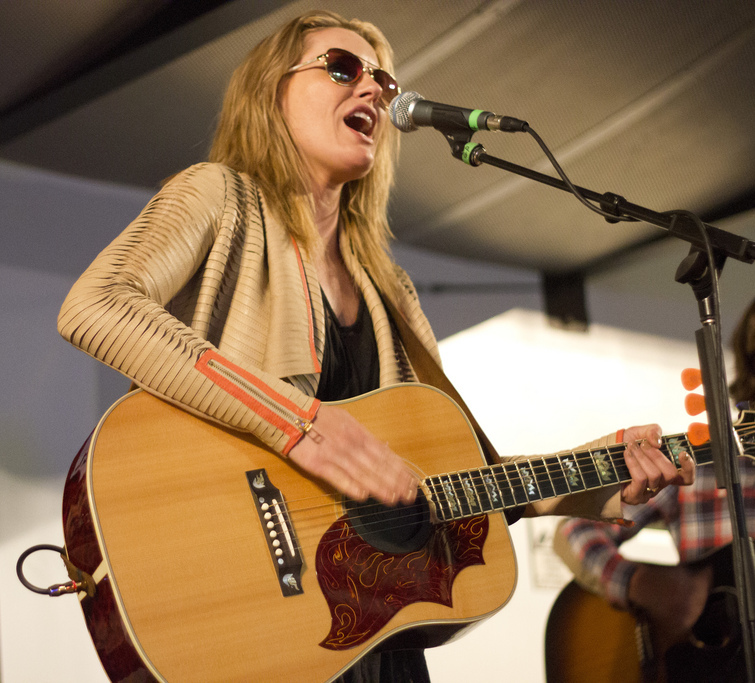
Grace Potter in 2012

The inaugural 2012 New England Music Awards were held at Boston Hard Rock Cafe, on March 9, 2012.

- Band of the Year – Grace Potter and the Nocturnals
- Album of the Year – Ragtop Angel by the Adam Ezra Group
- Song of the Year – "Takin Off" by the Adam Ezra Group
- Producer of the Year – Aaron Johnson
- Songwriter of the Year – Martin Sexton
- New Act of the Year – Suicide Dolls
- Female Performer of the Year – Liz Longley
- Male Performer of the Year – Chris Trapper

=== 2013 awards ===
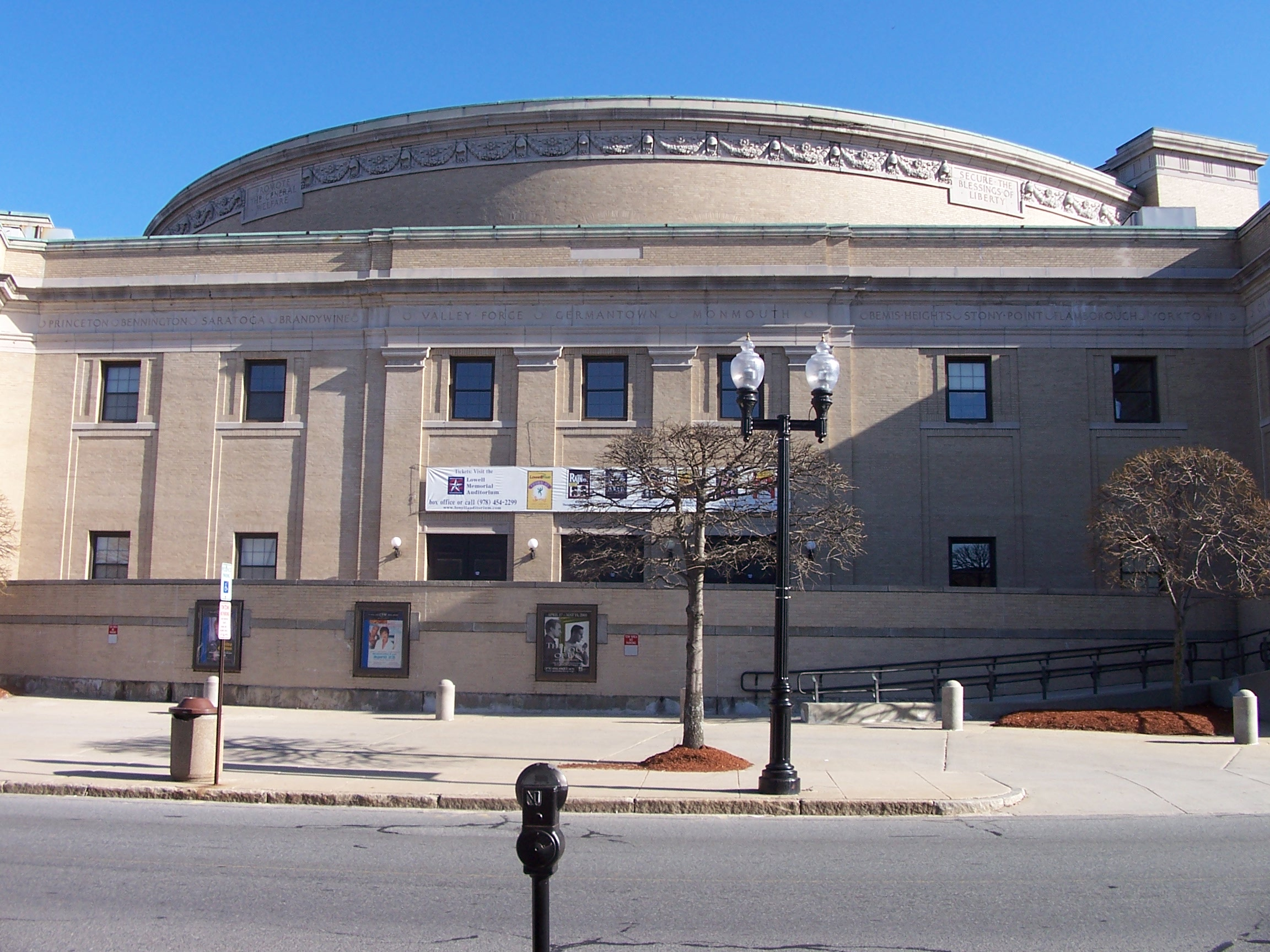
Lowell Memorial Auditorium, site of the 2013 and 2014 ceremonies

The 2013 New England Music Awards were held at Lowell Memorial Auditorium. The event was moved to accommodate all ages and an anticipated larger crowd.

- Band of the Year – The Adam Ezra Group
- Album of the Year – NORDO by Air Traffic Controller
- Song of the Year – "Yeah Man" by Ryan Montbleau
- Producer of the Year – Sean McLaughlin
- Songwriter of the Year – Matt Nathanson
- New Act of the Year – Sarah Borello
- Female Performer of the Year – Sarah Blacker
- Male Performer of the Year – Chris Trapper

=== 2014 awards ===
The 2014 New England Music Awards were held at Lowell Memorial Auditorium, on February 22, 2014. The ceremony began at 7 p.m., and coincided with the Lowell Winterfest. It was hosted by comedian Steve Sweeney, with performances by Nemes, the Mallett Brothers, Hayley Sabella, Dressed for the Occasion and Sarah Borrello.

- Band of the Year – The Mallett Brothers Band
- Album of the Year – Land by the Mallett Brothers Band
- Song of the Year – "The Dreams in the Ditch" by Deer Tick
- Producer of the Year – Nick Tirrell
- Songwriter of the Year – Chris Ross
- New Act of the Year – Sarah Barrios
- Female Performer of the Year – Lori McKenna
- Male Performer of the Year – Josh Logan

=== 2015 awards ===
The 2015 New England Music Awards were held at Showcase Live, on April 18, 2015. Boston Comedy Festival winner David Russo hosted the event, and the live performers were We Were Astronauts, Amy & the Engine, Pat & the Hats, the Willie J. Laws Band, Ben Knight and Sarah Barrios.

- Band of the Year – The Shana Stack Band
- Album of the Year – National Throat by Will Dailey
- Song of the Year – "Sunken Ship" by Will Dailey
- Producer of the Year – Brian Coombes
- Songwriter of the Year – Ellison Jackson
- New Act of the Year – West End Blend
- Female Performer of the Year – Anna Lombard
- Male Performer of the Year – Dan Blakeslee

=== 2016 awards ===
The 2016 New England Music Awards were held at Blue Ocean Music Hall. The ceremony began at 7:30 p.m.

- Band of the Year – Dwight & Nicole
- Album of the Year – Fall Your Way by Frank Viele
- Song of the Year – "Let Your Hair Down" by Adam Ezra Group
- Producer of the Year – Vic Steffens
- Songwriter of the Year – Daphne Lee Martin
- New Act of the Year – Hunter
- Female Performer of the Year – Ruby Rose Fox
- Male Performer of the Year – Frank Viele

=== 2017 awards ===
The 2017 New England Music Awards were held at Showcase Live, on April 29, 2017. Bands that performed were Cold Engines, Sygnal to Path and the Balkun Brothers, and the event closed with a tribute to Prince by the band Love Sexy.

- Band of the Year – Roots of Creation
- Album of the Year – Domestic by Ruby Rose Fox
- Song of the Year – "The Mystic" by Adam Jensen
- Producer of the Year – Jonathan Wyman
- Songwriter of the Year – Julia Russo
- New Act of the Year – Gracie Day
- Female Performer of the Year – Annie Brobst
- Male Performer of the Year – Jay Psaros

=== 2018 awards ===
The 2018 New England Music Awards were held at Mixx 360, in Malden, Massachusetts on September 8, 2018.

- Band of the Year – Ruby Rose Fox
- Album of the Year – Salt by Ruby Rose Fox
- Song of the Year – "Change of Heart" by Annie Brobst
- Producer of the Year – Sean McLaughlin
- Live Act of the Year – Flight of Fire
- New Act of the Year – Lyssa Coulter
- Songwriter of the Year – Frank Viele
- Male Performer of the Year – Munk Duane
- Female Performer of the Year – Christa Gniadek
- Rock Act of the Year – Analog Heart
- Pop Act of the Year – Ripe
- Hip Hop Act of the Year – Jazzmyn RED
- Country Act of the Year – Scarlett Drive
- Roots Act of the Year – Soggy Po Boys
- Hard Rock / Metal Act of the Year – FirstBourne
- Blues Act of the Year – Julie Rhodes
- Jazz Act of the Year – Gretchen & The Pickpockets
- Soul / R&B Act of the Year – Aubrey Haddard
- Best in State Massachusetts – Savasha
- Best in State New Hampshire – Katie Dobbins
- Best in State Vermont – Gang of Thieves
- Best in State Rhode Island – The Furies
- Best in State Maine – Emily and Jake
- Best in State Connecticut – Gracie Day
- Video of the Year – "After Party" by Air Traffic Controller, written and directed by Michael Parks Randa
- Video of the Year – "Freedom Fighter" by Ruby Rose Fox, directed by Ben Phillippo

=== 2019 awards ===
The 2019 New England Music Awards were held as Mixx 360 on September 7, 2019.

- Band of the Year – Flight of Fire
- Album of the Year – You Oughta Know by Natalie Joly
- Song of the Year – "Sunken Ship" by Will Dailey
- Producer of the Year – Sean McLaughlin
- Songwriter of the Year – Amanda McCarthy
- New Act of the Year – Exit 18
- Female Performer of the Year – Danielle Miraglia & the Glory Junkies
- Male Performer of the Year – Joe Sambo
- Hard Rock/Metal act of the year - Sepsiss

=== 2021 awards ===
The 2021 New England Music Awards were held at Mixx 360, on October 17, 2021, and were hosted by Adam Lopez and John Shea.

- Album of the Year – Meet Me in the Middle by Erin Harpe, featuring Jim Countryman
- Hard Rock/Metal act of the year - Sepsiss
- Songwriter of the Year - Sarah King
- Punk/Hardcore act of the Year - Mallcops

=== 2022 awards ===
The 2022 New England Music Awards were held at Six String Grill & Stage, on November 13, 2022, and were hosted by Adam Lopez and John Shea.

- Act of the Year - The Elovaters
- Album of the Year - Dalton & The Sheriffs “We’re Still Here”
- Americana Act of the Year - Town Meeting
- Blues Act of the Year - Gracie Grace and All The Good Boys
- Country Act of the Year - April Cushman
- Female Performer of the Year - Annie Brobst
- Hard Rock/Metal Act of the Year - Exit 18
- Hip Hop Act of the Year - Oompa
- Jazz Act of the Year - Club d’Elf
- Live Act of the Year - The Elovaters
- Male Performer of the Year - Nick Bosse
- New Act of the Year - The Chelsea Curve
- Pop Act of the Year - Lainey Dionne
- Producer of the Year - David Minehan Woolly Mammoth Sound
- Punk Act of the Year - Zombii
- Rising Star: Connecticut - The Sparkle and Fade
- Rising Star: Maine - 12/OC
- Rising Star: Massachusetts -Kaiti Jones
- Rising Star: New Hampshire - Fee the Evolutionist
- Rising Star: Rhode Island - Avi Jacob
- Rising Star: Vermont - Isabel Pless
- Rock Act of the Year - Cold Engines
- Roots Act of the Year - Whiskey Treaty Roadshow
- Song of the Year - OhYah. “Gone Before the Goodbye”
- Songwriter of the Year - Frank Viele
- Soul/R&B Act of the Year - Jill McCracken
- Video of the Year - Walter Sickert & the Army of Broken Toys – “Goth Beach”
- World Act of the Year - Toussaint the Liberator

=== 2023 Awards ===
The 2023 New England Music Awards were hosted at Six String Grill and Bar in Foxborough, Massachusetts, on November 12, 2023. The ceremony was hosted by Adam Lopez and Annie Brobst.

- Act of the Year - Frank Viele
- Album of the Year - Air Traffic Controller
- Song of the Year - 12/OC "Shoot You Down"
- Producer of the Year - Mel Go Hard
- Songwriter of the Year - Lainey Dionne
- Male Performer of the Year - Nick Casey
- Female Performer of the Year - Annie Brobst
- New Act of the Year - ToriTori
- Live Act of the Year - The Q-Tip Bandits
- Blues Act of the Year - The Name Droppers
- Rock Act of the Year - Moxie
- Punk Act of the Year - Shame Penguin
- Americana Act of the Year - Adam Ezra Group
- Country Act of the Year - April Cushman
- Pop Act of the Year - The Side Chick Syndicate
- Hard Rock/Metal Act of the Year - Sepsiss
- Roots Act of the Year - The Gravel Project
- Hip Hop Act of the Year - Chase Stebbins & The Only Known
- Jazz Act of the Year - Smug Honey
- Soul/R&B Act of the Year - Miranda Rae
- Rising Star: Connecticut - The Midnight Anthem
- Rising Star: Massachusetts - American Ink
- Rising Star: Rhode Island - Jackson Cafferty
- Rising Star: New Hampshire - Robotic Hawks
- Rising Star: Vermont - All Night Boogie Band
- Rising Star: Maine - Tyler Levs
- Video of the Year - Eddie Japan, "Time Machine" feat. Gregg Hawkes
- World Act of the Year - Nicolás Emden
- 2023 New England Music Awards: DECADE AWARD - Jay Psaros

=== 2024 Awards ===
The 2024 New England Music Awards were hosted at Six String Grill and Bar in Foxborough, Massachusetts, on November 10, 2024. The ceremony was hosted by comedian Adam Lopez and country artist Annie Brobst.

Act of the Year	12 O/C
Album of the Year	Jennifer Tefft and the Strange- “Strange Beginnings”
Song of the Year	Frank Viele – “The Trouble with Desire”
Producer of the Year	Sean McLaughlin 37′ Productions
Songwriter of the Year	Kai Wilson
Performer of the Year	Anna Daley Young
Performer of the Year	Sarah Blacker
New Act of the Year	The Far Out
Live Act of the Year	Kooked Out
Blues Act of the Year	GA-20
Rock Act of the Year	Total Strangers
Punk Act of the Year	JVK
Americana Act of the Year	Kier Byrnes and The Kettle Burners
Country Act of the Year	Houston Bernard
Pop Act of the Year	Lainey Dionne
Hard Rock/Metal Act of the Year	Dead by Wednesday
Roots Act of the Year	The Elovators
Hip Hop Act of the Year	Chase Stebbins & The Only Known
Jazz Act of the Year	Ben Cosgrove
Soul/R&B Act of the Year	Ruby Shabazz
Rising Star: Connecticut	One Time Weekend
Rising Star: Massachusetts	Burp.
Rising Star: Rhode Island	Jesse Humphrey
Rising Star: New Hampshire	Rumboat Chili
Rising Star: Vermont	Ida Mae Specker
Rising Star: Maine	Midnight Breakfast
Video of the Year	Dead by Wednesday- “Wasteland”
World Act of the Year	Alisa Amador

=== 2025 Awards ===
The 2025 New England Music Awards were hosted at Six String Grill and Bar in Foxborough, Massachusetts, on November 16, 2025. The ceremony was hosted by Adam Lopez and Annie Brobst.

- Act of the Year - Crooked Coast
- Album of the Year - Frank Viele - "The Trouble with Desire"
- Song of the Year - Nikki and the Barn Boys - "Strawberry Hill"
- Songwriter of the Year - Hayley Reardon
- Performers of the Year Awards (2) - Aldous Collins - Ward Hayden and the Outliers
- New Act of the Year - Vanna Pacella
- Live Act of the Year - The Far Out
- Blues Act of the Year - The Gravel Project
- Punk Rock Act of the Year - Megan From Work
- Rock Act of the Year - John Fox
- Country Act of the Year - Ward Hayden and the Outliers
- Pop Act of the Year - Lainey Dionne
- Hard Rock/Metal Act of the Year - Bad Marriage
- Americana Act of the Year - Nate Ramos Band
- Roots Act of the Year - Adam Frates
- Hip Hop Act of the Year - SeeFour
- Jazz Act of the Year - Soggy Po' Boys
- Soul/R&B Act of the Year - Ruby Shabazz
- World Act of the Year - FM Collective
- Rising Star: Connecticut - The Moonrise Cartel
- Rising Star: Massachusetts - Dred Buffalo
- Rising Star: Rhode Island - Olivia Dolphin
- Rising Star: New Hampshire - Fun City Fan Club
- Rising Star: Vermont - Lily Seabird
- Rising Star: Maine - Bella Ann
- Video of the Year - The Far Out, "Laurel" - Nick DeSimone (Director)
- Producer of the Year - Vic Steffens (Horizon Music Group)
