= Will Dailey =

American singer-songwriter (born 1976/77)

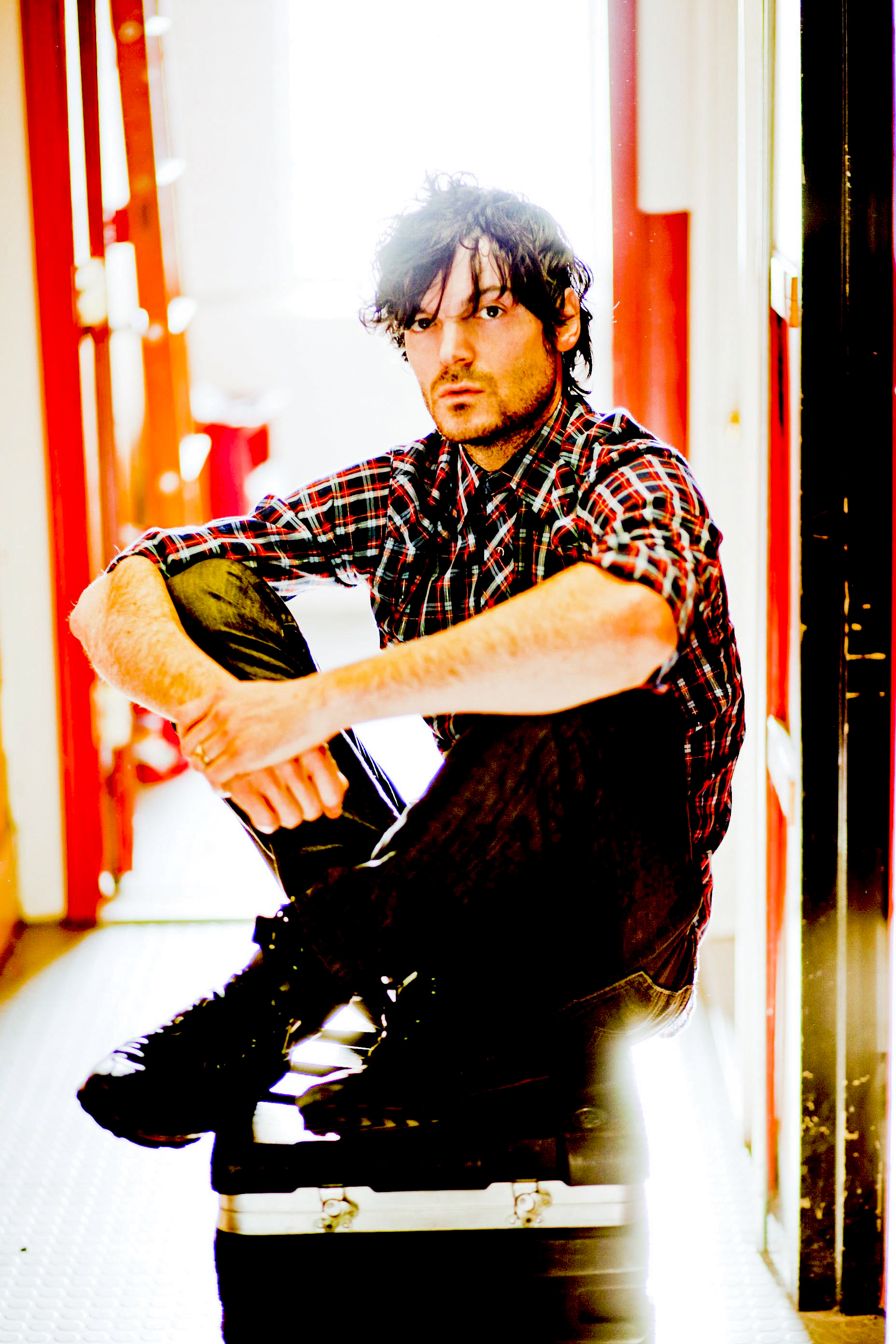
- Will Dailey in 2013

Background information
- Born: 1976 or 1977 (age 49–50)
- Origin: Allston, Boston, Massachusetts
- Genres: Rock, Roots, pop
- Years active: 2003–present
- Labels: Universal Republic, CBS Records, JSM, Wheelkick Records (Current)
- Member of: Will Dailey & The Rivals
- Website: www.willdailey.com

Will Dailey is an American independent recording artist, performer and producer. His sound has been described as being vintage inspired while having characteristics of AM rock, pop and big hooks.

He has released albums with Universal, CBS Records, Wheelkick Records and JS Music Group. Dailey has released seven full-length albums since 2004. His seventh full-length record, Boys Talking, was released physically in late 2024 and arrived on streaming platforms on February 27, 2026. His full-length album, National Throat, came out on Wheelkick Records, on August 26, 2014. It directly followed Dailey's choice to split with a major label and use Pledge Music to create his album. Dailey is a Neighborhood Salon Luminary at the Isabella Stewart Gardner Museum in Boston, where he has performed in the Calderwood Hall RISE Music Series and at Third Thursdays events. In 2023 he began the $10 Dollar Song, a project created with the intention of prioritizing human connection over algorithms and analytics where his song "Cover of Clouds" can only be heard one time at a listening station at live shows. A 2017 article in The Simple Dollar highlighted his work ethic and indie ethos, labeling Dailey a "middle-class musician. In 2024, Dailey performed at the inaugural Folk, Americana and Roots Hall of Fame induction ceremony, paying tribute to Richie Havens and Pete Seeger. The ceremony was broadcast as a special on PBS and nominated for an emmy.

Based out of Boston, he is notable as being a 7-time winner in the Boston Music Award: Best Male Singer-Songwriter in 2006, again on December 2, 2009 and December 2, 2012 and Album of the Year and Artist of the Year December 14, 2014 and Male Vocalist in 2015 and 2016. The first single, "Sunken Ship", was a finalist in the 2013 International Songwriting Competition, received heavy radio play and received Song of The Year in the New England Music Awards. The album was released exclusively on vinyl three month prior to official release date. It premiered on Billboards Heat Seekers chart at #18 and won Album of the Year in the New England Music Awards April 19, 2015 as well. In 2009 and 2010, Dailey released Torrent, which involved the artist digitally releasing a burst of new music approximately every three months, and then compiling that material, along with bonus material, as a physical and digital audio package twice a year.

Dailey is also a part of the John Mellencamp and Stephen King musical project Ghost Brothers of Darkland County.

== Career ==
At age 12, Dailey used his own savings to buy a small guitar and amp. By age 16, he had completed his first public performance on stage at a pub.

Will Dailey, with his band The Rivals, has performed at the annual Farm Aid benefit concert four times: in 2008, 2009, 2011 and 2013. Dailey is currently a member of the Farm Aid Development Advisory Board.

His songs have appeared in a variety of venues, including numerous television shows (see a partial list of Will Dailey's songs featured in television programs).

In a 2009 review of one of his live shows in support of Torrent, Dan Aquilante of The New York Post called Dailey "the real deal", and compared his musical style to that of Tim Buckley and John Mayer.

== Charity work ==
Since 2009 Dailey has been closely involved and performing regularly in Theo Epstein and Peter Gammons charity event Hot Stove Cool Music to benefit The Foundation To Be Named Later since 2010 in both Chicago and Boston. In addition to performing his material, Dailey performed three times on separate occasions with Eddie Vedder at the event and once with Letters To Cleo.

Since 2014, Dailey has been on the Development Advisory Counsel for Farm Aid.

In 2013 Dailey was the artist ambassador to an East Boston-based nonprofit organization ZUMIX dedicated to building of community through music and the arts and continues to remain associated.

In 2020, at the onset of the Covid lockdown and the cancelation of 2020 tours, Dailey began streaming concerts from his shower in support of Boston Venues and independent musicians facing economic distress. By the end of the run, over $20,000 was raised to support those in need.

== GoodbyeRedBullet ==
In 2004, Dailey sold his car to pay for the release of his first full-length solo album, GoodbyeRedBullet. Although the proceeds of the sale were enough to fund the release of his CD, there was not enough surplus to finance a tour. Dailey instead relied upon his family and friends to generate publicity, a tactic which eventually gained him a mailing list of more than 25,000 worldwide. GoodByeRedBullet was released April 20, 2004 and eventually sold more than 10,000 copies.

Rootstime.de called "GoodbyeRedBullet", "Intelligent Songwriting." While Billy Zero of XM Radio Unsigned Radio said of the album, "Songs from the Heart is what you get when you place this order. Simply amazing songwriting and beautiful lyrics."

Following the success of this first album, Dailey began an intensive tour of the West Coast. Stricken with appendicitis and lacking health insurance, he was faced with nearly insurmountable debt. For health and financial reasons, he reluctantly abandoned the tour temporarily, squashing his hopes for a second album and compounding his financial woes. Thereafter, Dailey was able to proceed with his tour for a short while as a means of paying his staggering medical bills.

This situation soon changed when he achieved a record deal from an independent label in Los Angeles, providing him with the financial means to begin recording his second full-length album.

== Back Flipping Forward ==
Back Flipping Forward was released on April 18, 2006.

External videos
- Will Dailey performs rise on CSI:NY

In late 2006, Will Dailey was among the first artists signed to the newly reformed CBS Records. A large part of the focus for the label will be the promotion of artists who gain notoriety through the media company's own TV programs, whether aired on CBS channels, or made by CBS Paramount Television for broadcast on other networks. The New York Post underscored this agenda, citing appearances of other musicians in CBS programming as a means of promoting upcoming releases and television programs, such as the Grammy Awards.

September 4, 2007 marked the release of a deluxe package of the song Rise exclusively to the Internet music and video download service iTunes. The deluxe edition featured the album version of the track, an acoustic version, and a live in-studio video.

Back Flipping Forward was remixed and re-released October 2, 2007 through CBS Records. Dailey's cover recording of Tears For Fears' "Everybody Wants To Rule The World" was made available as a bonus track to anyone purchasing the re-release of Back Flipping Forward on iTunes. Dailey's version was also used extensively by CBS for on-air promotion of the series, Kid Nation. Dailey appeared in an episode of CSI: NY on October 17, 2007. He was seen and heard performing "Rise" in a club, while Gary Sinise's character Mac Taylor played bass alongside him.

== Torrent ==
In 2009, Dailey released a new EP every few months as part of his year-long musical project called Torrent. Torrent, Volume 1: Fashion of Distraction, which was inspired by The Byrds and features contributions from Roger McGuinn was released digitally on January 20, 2009.

Torrent, Volume 2: By the Blue Hills was released digitally on March 17, 2009. The album is dedicated to his hometown of Boston and features guests like Elliot Easton of The Cars, Tanya Donelly of Throwing Muses and Belly, Kay Hanley of Letters To Cleo and Tim Brennan of Dropkick Murphys.

Dailey's song, "Tomorrow Still Comes" was also featured on NCIS: The Official TV Soundtrack, which was released February 10, 2009 and used prominently in the NCIS episode "South By Southwest" on February 24, 2009. Additionally, "Peace Of Mind" from the first Torrent volume was featured in the NCIS episode "Semper Fidelis" on May 12, 2009. Torrent: Volumes 1 & 2 was released on June 9, 2009, combining the previous two EPs into a physical package, along with two bonus tracks.

Torrent, Volumes 1 & 2, was released in both DVD and CD formats. The DVD was released in the then-new ΧΟΔΕ audio standard, which is meant to have a much higher fidelity to the original recording. The Torrent DVD also contains all of the songs in .wav, .aac and .mp3 formats. The package also contains a standard CD. The CD, though a double album, was sold at a single-CD price.

In May 2009, Dailey released a promotional video for Torrent, in which he is forced by his managers to make a commercial for Torrent in the style of a famously over-the-top 1976 TV commercial for the Peter Lemongello album Love '76.

== National Throat ==
National Throat was released worldwide on August 26, 2014. The album was released exclusively on vinyl three months prior to the worldwide release.

The album was inspired by a failing business relationship, wherein Dailey felt like he was a "passenger on a sinking ship." Dailey willingly walked away from one of the largest labels in the world, took charge and involved his fans in a communal creative process through PledgeMusic to make National Throat.

National Throat debuted in the top 20 on the Billboard Heatseekers chart. Journalist Jon Karr said of National Throat, "Dailey's latest album makes it clear that good songwriting isn't a matter of hiding behind shiny production or an over-stylized persona. His music doesn't contain a note of pretense. If anything, it is committed to the beauty of simplicity. National Throat is a statement about the value of creativity and the survival of art. Dailey believes the truth will find its way out, that what is real and beautiful will rise to the top."

External videos
- Will Dailey's "Sunken Ship" music video

Just before the global release of National Throat, Dailey released his first music video "Sunken Ship." Directed by Joe Carter, Dailey's physical and mental limitations take shape by way of a bathtub in Duxbury, Massachusetts and a beachfront in Newburyport, Massachusetts. Dailey followed with a lyric music video for "Higher Education" in late September 2014. The song and video were inspired by Dailey's experience at Zumix, a Boston-based nonprofit organization dedicated to empowering youth and building communities through music and the arts. The music video is dedicated to Zumix and includes several of the children Dailey mentored.

Dailey and National Throat won Album of the Year and Artist of the year in the 2014 Boston Music Awards. The Improper Bostonian Magazine also awarded National Throat Album of The Year in June 2015. It also won Album of The Year and Song of the Year (Sunken Ship) in the New England Music Awards in February 2015.

== Golden Walker ==
External videos
- Will Dailey's animated video for "Bad Behavior" directed by Justin Nixon

Golden Walker, Dailey's 6th full-length album, was released June 1, 2018. The first single "It Already Would Have Not Worked Out By Now" was released March 2018 and the second single "Bad Behavior" April 20. The album debuted #1 on the Northeast Heat Seekers chart on Billboard. The Boston Herald called the album "a new peak" for Dailey and called Golden Walker a top album of 2018 alongside Lake Street Dive, Janelle Monae, Brandi Carlile and Neko Case.

== Boys Talking ==
External videos
- Will Dailey's lyric video for "My Old Ride" Shot by Will Dailey and Dave Brophy

Boys Talking is Dailey's seventh studio album, recorded live over ten days at a single studio session with a group of collaborators including longtime musical partner Dave Brophy, Juliana Hatfield, Fabiola Méndez, Alisa Amador, Cody Nilsen, Jeremy Moses Curtis, Abby Barrett, Kevin Barry, and James Rohr. Overdubs were kept to a minimum, preserving the live performance quality of the recordings.

The album was released in an unconventional manner. Rather than distributing it through streaming platforms upon completion, Dailey made it available exclusively on vinyl, CD, and direct download beginning in 2024, touring the United States, Canada, and Europe with physical copies before any digital release. Dailey described the approach as prioritizing "people before platforms," allowing the music to reach listeners through direct purchase and live performance over an eighteen-month period. Audiences who purchased the physical record were invited to participate in determining which songs would eventually be released digitally.

On February 27, 2026, Boys Talking became available on streaming platforms. One track, "Alright Already," remains exclusive to the physical release. The album received coverage from WBUR, the Boston Herald, Magnet Magazine, Goldmine Magazine, Stereo Embers, and Twangville upon its streaming release.

Magnet Magazine featured an exclusive full-album premiere in which Dailey provided track-by-track commentary, describing the record as exploring communication, masculinity, grief, and digital culture. The Boston Herald noted that "the release strategy mirrors the recording process — nothing has been rushed."

== Equipment ==
Dailey plays a custom built Novo and Fano electric guitar model JM6 through a Swart Space tone and Goodsell Super 17 and various acoustic guitars including Scott Baxendale Customs and a D'Angelico acoustic.

== Discography ==
=== Albums ===
- GoodbyeRedBullet 2004
- Back Flipping Forward 2006
- Torrent, Volume 1: Fashion of Distraction 2009
- Torrent, Volume 2: By The Blue Hills 2009
- Torrent, Volumes 1 & 2 2009
- Will Dailey & The Rivals 2011
- National Throat 2014
- Golden Walker 2018
- Boys Talking 2024/2025

=== Compilations and other recordings ===
- "NCIS Soundtrack Vol. 1" 2009
- "90210 Soundtrack" 2009
- "Music Hits Home" 2010
- "Subterranean Homesick Blues" 2010
- "The Right Track: Tunes to target Cancer" 2010
- "Cover of Nirvana's Territorial P***ings" 2011
- "WERS Music For The Independent Mind Volume 7" 2012
- "Ghost Brothers of Darkland County" 2013
- "Esperanza: Songs from Jack Kerouac's Tristessa" 2013
- "Boston Does Boston Compilation" 2013
- "20 Essential Will Dailey Songs" 2014
- "Live From The Record Parlour" 2015
- "Abrazo - The Havana Sessions" 2016
- "I Would Die 4 U" 2016
- "Human Ammunition Vol. 1" 2016
- "Pattern of Deconstruction" EP 2020
- "Easy To Be Around" Single 2022
- "Christmas, Of Course" Single 2022
- "More Love Than Myth (Tell the Children) Single 2023

=== Produced ===
- "Goodbye Red Bullet" - Album - Will Dailey (2004)
- "Dear Grace" - Track From "Back Flipping Forward" - Will Dailey (2008)
- "We've Got To Find An Easier Way" - Album – Brian Bergeron (2009)
- "Hands" - Track from "Torrent Vol. 1 & 2" - Will Dailey (2009)
- "Gone Before You Know" - EP – Old Jack (2010)
- "I Hate New York" - EP - Brendan Boogie (2011)
- "Territorial Pissings" - Track from "Come As You Are" - Will Dailey (2011)
- "The Things You Keep" - EP - Jon Gorey (2011)
- "Autumn Hollow" - Album - Autumn Hollow (2013)
- "Broke My Calm" - Track From "Esperanza" Compilation - Will Dailey (2013)
- "Bright" - Track From "Boston Does Boston Vol. 1 & 2" - Will Dailey (2013)
- "National Throat" - Album - Will Dailey (2014)
- "Soft Exile" - EP - Soft Exile (2014)
- "Oh, The Ego" - Album - Audrey Ryan (2014)
- "Die Pretty" & "Unusual Grace" - Single/B Side - Ruby Rose Fox (2014)
- "Braid (Live)" - Live Video Production & Mix - Gem Club (2014)
- "Lay My Body Down For You" - Single - When Particles Collide (2017)
- "Golden Walker" - Album - Will Dailey (2018)
- "No Matter What" - Single - Cliff Notez (2019)
- "Butterfly 503" - Single - Samantha Farrell (2019)
- "At the Edge of the World" - Single - Samantha Farrell (2020)
- "Too Tired To Fly" - Single - Samantha Farrell (2022)
- "Christmas, Of Course" - Single - Will Dailey (2022)
- "Could Be Normal" - Single - Cliff Notez (2023)
- "More Love Than Myth (Tell The Children)" - Single - Will Dailey (2023)
- "Beast" - Single - Cliff Notez (2024)
- "Make Another Me" - Single - Will Dailey (2024)
- "Boys Talking" - Album - Will Dailey (2025)

== Partial list of Will Dailey's songs featured in television programs, film and digital media ==
Song Title	Show	Episode Title	Original U.S. Airdate	Notes
"Once In A Century Storm"	Detours	"Antiques Road Show Podcast"	2020	
"Up To Your Heart"	Greek God Of Hops	"Kevin Youkilis Podcast"	2020	
"Hands"	BOSE	"S1 PRO Commercial"	2018	
"Don't Take Your Eyes Off Of Me"	Banshee	"Episode 407"	2016	
"$300 Man"	BOSE	"F1 Promotion Videos"	2016	
"Why Do I"	Harpoon Beer	"Take 5 Promotion Commercial"	2015	
"Big Bright Sun"	NCIS	"Tell-All"	March 29, 2011	
"How Can I Make You Happy"	The Green Room with Paul Provenza	"Showtime Promo Trailer"	May 14, 2010	Multi-week promotional campaign
"Tomorrow Still Comes"	Numb3rs	"Devil Girl"	January 29, 2010	
"Eliza"	Numb3rs	"7 Men out"	October 9, 2009	
"How Can I Make You Happy"	NCIS Los Angeles	"Predator"	October 6, 2009	
"Never Be Your Baby"	Ghost Whisperer	"See No Evil"	October 2, 2009	
"Down The Drain"	The Good Wife	Premiere Episode	September 22, 2009	
"Love Is on the Way"	Accidentally on Purpose		Fall 2009	Multi-week promotional campaign
"Hallelujah"	The Cleaner	"The Things We Didn't Plan"	July 28, 2009	
"How Can I Make You Happy"	The Late Late Show with Craig Ferguson		July 14, 2009	Live performance
"Undone"	Middle of Nowhere	2008	Film	
"How Can I Make You Happy"	The Early Show		June 16, 2009	Live performance
"Peace Of Mind"	NCIS	"Semper Fidelis"	May 12, 2009	
"Keep You A Mystery"	90210	"The Party's Over"	May 5, 2009	
"Never Be Your Baby"	Harper's Island	"Bang"	May 2, 2009	
"The Right One"	Numb3rs	"Animal Rites"	April 10, 2009	
"Keep You A Mystery"	NCIS	"Toxic"	April 7, 2009	
"Tomorrow Still Comes"	NCIS	"South By Southwest"	February 24, 2009	
"Never Be Your Baby"	90210	"Games People Play"	November 11, 2008	
"Peace Of Mind"	90210	"Games People Play"	November 11, 2008	
"Rise"	CSI		October 2008	Promotional campaign
"Boom Boom"	As the World Turns		October 3, 2008	On-camera performance
"Rise"	As the World Turns		October 3, 2008	On-camera performance
"Rise"	Numb3rs	"End Game"	April 25, 2008	
"Rise"	Eli Stone	"Patience"	April 10, 2008	
"Grand Opening"	Life Is Wild	"The Code"	December 9, 2007	
"Grand Opening"	Gossip Girl	"Blair Waldorf Must Pie!"	November 28, 2007	
"Grand Opening"	Life Is Wild	"The Heart Wants What It Wants"	November 18, 2007	
"Grand Opening"	Cane	"One Man Is An Island"	November 6, 2007	
"Good To Me"	Viva Laughlin		October 21, 2007	
"Rise"	The Early Show		October 17, 2007	Live performance
"Rise"	CSI: NY	"Time's Up"	October 17, 2007	On-camera performance
"Undone"	NCIS	"Ex-File"	October 9, 2007	
"Hollywood Hills"	The Hills	"They Meet Again"	September 17, 2007	
"Everybody Wants To Rule The World"	Kid Nation		August 2007	Multi-week promotional campaign
"Undone"	Army Wives	"Who We Are"	July 8, 2007	
"Eliza"	CSI: Miami	"Born To Kill"	May 14, 2007	
"Rise"	NCIS	"Cover Story"	April 10, 2007	
"Hollywood Hills"	What About Brian	"What About Finding Your Place…"	February 12, 2007	
"Bi-Polar Baby"	Ghost Whisperer	"Cat's Claw"	December 15, 2006	
"Grand Opening"	Jericho	"Vox Populi"	November 29, 2006	
