= NCIS (soundtrack) =

Soundtrack of the television series NCIS

NCIS: The Official TV Soundtrack – Vol. 1-3

Soundtrack album by Various
- Released: February 10, 2009
- Recorded: Various dates
- Genres: Soundtrack, rock
- Languages: English, French
- Label: CBS

NCIS: The Official TV Soundtrack is a series of soundtrack albums featuring music used in the CBS television series NCIS. The first volume in the series, released on February 10, 2009, received attention for its method of compiling music for the album; show producers and writers were presented previously unreleased tracks from popular artists "ranging from Perry Farrell to Jakob Dylan as the shows were being crafted, and then taking inspiration from those tunes to help craft the show." This method contrasted with the norm for TV soundtracks, which tend to be compilations of previously released music that is already available individually or on other albums. NCIS: The Official TV Soundtrack – Vol. 2 was released on November 3, 2009, according to Amazon.com.

== Volume 1 ==
=== Overview ===
NCIS: The Official TV Soundtrack is the first soundtrack album from the television series NCIS. The album is a two-disc, 22-track set that includes brand new songs from artists featured prominently in episodes of the series. According to the soundtrack website, NCIS show producers listened to literally dozens of submitted tracks before choosing the ones best suited for upcoming storylines, and from which the show's writers could draw upon for inspiration. The soundtrack also features NCIS stars Pauley Perrette ("Abby Sciuto"), who performs the self-composed "Fear" under the moniker Stop Making Friends, and Cote de Pablo ("Ziva David"), whose memorable performance of Tom Waits' "Temptation" from the Season 6 premiere episode, "Last Man Standing", is included. It is Perrette’s character, Abby, whose music sensibilities in the show serve as the basis for the soundtrack’s "Abby’s Lab" disk 2.

=== Track listing ===
Disc 1: Special Agent
No.	Title	Artist	Length
1.	"Kangaroo Cry"	Blue October	4:24
2.	"Even Now"	Dashboard Confessional	3:33
3.	"After All"	Saving Abel	3:16
4.	"No Matter What"	Jakob Dylan	4:04
5.	"Troubled Land"	John Mellencamp	3:20
6.	"Boy with the Blues"	Oasis	4:41
7.	"Things Have Changed"	Bob Dylan	5:09
8.	"Tomorrow Still Comes"	Will Dailey	3:41
9.	"Peppermint & Glue"	Sharon Little	3:56
10.	"Mama Song"	Keaton Simons	3:20
11.	"Temptation"	Cote de Pablo	2:52
12.	"NCIS Theme"	Numeriklab	2:20
Total length:			44:33

Disc 2: Abby's Lab
No.	Title	Artist	Length
1.	"NCIS Theme Remix"	Ministry	3:13
2.	"No Shelter"	Seether	4:07
3.	"Nasty Little Perv"	Perry Farrell	2:35
4.	"Love Is Like"	Skold vs. KMFDM	4:04
5.	"I Don't Want To Be On T.V."	The Airborne Toxic Event	3:27
6.	"Promises"	Nitzer Ebb	3:48
7.	"Fear"	Stop Making Friends (Pauley Perrette)	4:29
8.	"Hole Solution"	Android Lust	4:18
9.	"Head Spin"	Collide	4:18
10.	"Satellite 2009"	Solamingus	2:31
Total length:			36:56

=== Songs used in NCIS episodes ===
Song Title	Artist	Season	Episode Title	Original U.S. Airdate
"Kangaroo Cry"	Blue October	Season 7	Faith	December 15, 2009
"Fear"	Stop Making Friends	Season 6	Aliyah	May 19, 2009
"Boy With The Blues"	Oasis	Season 6	Legend Pt. 1	April 28, 2009
"Even Now"	Dashboard Confessional	Season 6	Legend Pt. 1	April 28, 2009
"No Matter What"	Jakob Dylan	Season 6	Toxic	April 7, 2009
"No Shelter"	Seether	Season 6	Dead Reckoning	March 31, 2009
"Satellite 2009"	Solamingus	Season 6	Hide and Seek	March 24, 2009
"Nasty Little Perv"	Perry Farrell	Season 6	Knockout	March 17, 2009
"Tomorrow Still Comes"	Will Dailey	Season 6	South By Southwest	February 24, 2009
"Love Is Like"	Skold vs. KMFDM	Season 6	Bounce	February 17, 2009
"I Don't Want To Be On TV"	The Airborne Toxic Event	Season 6	Deliverance	February 10, 2009
"Peppermint & Glue"	Sharon Little	Season 6	Love & War	January 27, 2009
"Promises"	Nitzer Ebb	Season 6	Broken Bird	January 13, 2009
"Head Spin"	Collide	Season 6	Caged	January 6, 2009
"After All"	Saving Abel	Season 6	Road Kill	December 2, 2008
"Troubled Land"	John Mellencamp	Season 6	Collateral Damage	November 11, 2008
"Temptation"	Cote de Pablo	Season 6	Last Man Standing	September 23, 2008
"Mama Song"	Keaton Simons	Season 5	Judgment Day – Part 1	May 20, 2008
"All We Are"	Matt Nathanson	Season 5	Family	October 2, 2007
"Things Have Changed"	Bob Dylan	Season 4	Sharif Returns	January 23, 2007
"Satellite 2009"	Solamingus	Season 4	Faking It	October 10, 2006
"Hole Solution"	Android Lust	Season 3	Frame-Up	November 22, 2005

== Volume 2 ==
NCIS: The Official TV Soundtrack – Vol. 2

Soundtrack album by Various
- Released: November 3, 2009
- Recorded: Various dates
- Genre: Soundtrack
- Language: English
- Label: CBS

=== Overview ===
NCIS: The Official TV Soundtrack – Vol. 2 is the second soundtrack album from the television series NCIS. The album is a 12-track set that includes brand new and exclusive songs from artists featured prominently in 2009-2010 episodes of the series, including Bob Dylan whose newly remixed and mastered "California" from the artist's Bringing It All Back Home sessions marks the first commercial release of this track. John Mellencamp's "Someday The Rains Will Fall" was recorded during the summer of 2009 in room 636 of the Gunter Hotel in San Antonio, Texas – the same room blues legend Robert Johnson recorded many of his classic songs in 1936. NCIS star Michael Weatherly (Special Agent Anthony DiNozzo) contributes his own "Bitter And Blue", specifically recorded for the soundtrack album. Norah Jones, Joss Stone, Sick Puppies, Sharon Little, Sheryl Crow, Keaton Simons, and Saosin all contribute new and exclusive tracks. Otis Redding's "I've Got Dreams To Remember" and Tom Lehrer's "The Elements," both utilized in previous season's episodes, round out the album.

=== Track listing ===
No.	Title	Artist	Length
1.	"California"	Bob Dylan	3:04
2.	"That's What I Said"	Norah Jones	2:42
3.	"Every Time I Turn Around"	Joss Stone	4:24
4.	"That Time Of Year"	Sick Puppies	3:51
5.	"Genie In My Dreams"	Sharon Little	3:25
6.	"Someday The Rains Will Fall"	John Mellencamp	4:33
7.	"Murder In My Heart"	Sheryl Crow	3:31
8.	"Grim Reaper"	Keaton Simons	2:58
9.	"I've Got Dreams To Remember"	Otis Redding	3:35
10.	"Bitter And Blue"	Michael Weatherly	3:51
11.	"Move Slow"	Saosin	3:09
12.	"The Elements"	Tom Lehrer	1:23
Total length:			40:26

=== Songs used in NCIS episodes ===
Song Title	Artist	Season	Episode Title	Original U.S. Airdate
"That Time Of Year"	Sick Puppies	Season 7	Child's Play	November 24, 2009
"California"	Bob Dylan	Season 7	Outlaws and In-Laws	November 3, 2009
"Move Slow"	Saosin	Season 7	Code Of Conduct	October 20, 2009
"I've Got Dreams To Remember"	Otis Redding	Season 5	In The Zone	April 29, 2008
"The Elements"	Tom Lehrer	Season 5	Ex-file	October 9, 2007
"Genie In My Dreams"	Sharon Little	Season 7	Masquerade	February 2, 2010
"Murder in My Heart"	Sheryl Crow	Season 7	Mother's Day	March 2, 2010
"Someday the Rains Will Fall"	John Mellencamp	Season 7	Double Identity	March 9, 2010

== Volume 3 ==
NCIS: The Official TV Score

Soundtrack album by Brian Kirk
- Released: March 29, 2011
- Recorded: Various dates
- Genre: Soundtrack
- Language: English
- Label: CBS

=== Overview ===
NCIS: The Official TV Score is the third soundtrack album from the television series NCIS. NCIS composer Brian Kirk created each of the album's 14 tracks by mixing various musical pieces from the show's episodes into standalone suites of music. The resulting album presents the NCIS music in a cohesive format designed to be listened to as fans would any of their favorite albums.

=== Track listing ===
No.	Title	Length
1.	"My Boss Is A Sniper/Gibbs' Rules"	3:48
2.	"Tony And Ziva Under Covers"	3:31
3.	"Bag And Tag"	3:08
4.	"Enemies: Foreign And Domestic"	3:24
5.	"Double-0 DiNozzo"	4:07
6.	"Aliyah"	3:01
7.	"Gathering Intel"	3:31
8.	"Abby In Wonderland"	4:15
9.	"DiNozzo, Take McGee"	4:12
10.	"Gibbs Visits An Old Friend"	3:35
11.	"Vance's Dossier"	4:27
12.	"Ducky's Whisper To The Departed"	4:02
13.	"Ziva Betrayed"	2:42
14.	"Gibbs In The Heartland"	2:58
15.	"NCIS Main Theme"	0:31
Total length:		51:22

== Volume 4 ==
NCIS: Benchmark – The Official TV Soundtrack

Soundtrack album by Various
- Released: September 24, 2013
- Recorded: Various dates
- Genre: Soundtrack
- Language: English
- Label: Artists' Addiction Records

=== Overview ===
NCIS: Benchmark – The Official TV Soundtrack is the fourth soundtrack album from the television series NCIS. The album consists of 14 tracks used in the show.

=== Track listing ===
No.	Title	Artist	Length
1.	"Moving In the Dark"	Neon Trees	3:02
2.	"Off I Go"	Greg Laswell	4:18
3.	"Somebody Saved You"	Pauley Perrette	4:35
4.	"Better Off Now (2010 Mix)"	Trent Dabbs	4:10
5.	"Forgive Me"	Michael Des Barres	3:43
6.	"Under The Sun"	Michael Weatherly	3:36
7.	"Wheels"	Fink	3:02
8.	"Not Alone"	Patty Griffin	4:30
9.	"I'll Never Get Out Of This World Alive"	Hank Williams	2:25
10.	"Hello World"	Lady Antebellum	5:23
11.	"I'm Glad There Is You"	Jane Monheit	5:07
12.	"Caught By the Light"	The Boxer Rebellion	4:46
13.	"O Mio Babbino Caro"	Lesley Garrett	2:24
14.	"NCIS Theme (Orchestral Attack)"	Brian Kirk	0:51
Total length:			51:52
