= The Makem Brothers =

Irish-American folk music band

The Makem Brothers (Makem and Spain)
- Origin: Dover, New Hampshire, USA
- Genres: Folk
- Years active: 1989–2018
- Label: Red Biddy Records
- Past members: Rory Makem; Liam Spain; Mickey Spain; Conor Makem; Shane Makem; Brian Sullivan
- Website: Official website

Makem and Spain was an Irish-American folk music band. The band was founded as "The Makem Brothers" in February 1989 by Rory, Shane, and Conor Makem, the three sons of "The Godfather of Irish Music" Tommy Makem, and grandsons of Irish source singer Sarah Makem.

In 2003, brothers Liam and Mickey Spain joined, and the band was renamed "The Makem and Spain Brothers". When Shane and Conor Makem left in 2014, the band was renamed "Makem and Spain".

On March 5, 2018, Makem & Spain announced on their Facebook page that they were breaking up, bringing down the final curtain on the act originally known as the Makem Brothers.

== Biography ==
The three Makem brothers were born in Drogheda, County Louth, Ireland and grew up in Dover, New Hampshire, where the family moved to in the mid 1970s. Their father, Tommy Makem, was one of the most famous Irish musicians in the world, first as a member of The Clancy Brothers and Tommy Makem and later as a solo act and then as a duo with Liam Clancy. Tommy's mother was the singer and traditional song collector Sarah Makem. The Makem Brothers' elder sister Katie Makem is also a performer, although she does not tour professionally. Shane Makem was born in August 1967, Conor in September 1968 and Rory in October 1969.

Both Shane and Conor attended Stonehill College in Easton, Massachusetts and Rory went to Bard College in Annandale-on-Hudson, New York. As a student at Bard College, Rory formed a band with Lisa Gentile, Lisa Lisa and the Country Jam.

In February 1989, Shane and Rory Makem founded the band, the Makem Brothers, debuting at the now-closed Blackthorne Tavern in Easton, Massachusetts. Guitarist Brian Sullivan joined the duo soon after. The Makem Brothers and Brian Sullivan were set to perform at the Tom Clancy Memorial Concert in New York City in November 1991; for the event, they wanted a bass player. Their father, Tommy Makem, suggested their middle brother, Conor Makem, and so he debuted with his brothers and Brian Sullivan at the memorial concert.

In 1992, the quartet recorded a demo album which was later commercially released for a time. Songs on the demo included Charlie and the MTA and Maid of Fife-O. In 1994 the Makem Brothers and Brian Sullivan released their first full-length album, Out Standing in a Field. Also that year, they made their television debut on Tommy Makem's PBS television special, Songs Of The Sea. Judy Collins also performed on that special.

Brian Sullivan left the band in 1995 but stayed on to play backup on the Makem Brothers' second album, On the Rocks. The Makem Brothers continued as a trio for eight more years, releasing two more albums, Who Fears to Speak in 1998 and [Stand Together in 2001. In 1997, they filmed a concert for Iowa PBS that was released on videocassette.

In 2003, the New Hampshire-based Irish folk musicians teamed up with The Spain Brothers, Liam and Mickey Spain (both natives of Manchester, New Hampshire), to become The Makem and Spain Brothers. Though they had been informally performing together for several years, their first official concert as a five-piece band took place at the Narrows Center for the Arts in Fall River, Massachusetts, in February 2003. They were billed as the Makem Brothers with Mickey and Liam Spain. Their combined forces preserve and advance folk music from Ireland, Scotland, Wales and New England, as well as whaling songs, fishing songs, mining songs, even Australian Bush songs. Influences include The Clancy Brothers, Ewan MacColl, and The Corries, also known as "The Corrie Folk Trio".

The Makem and Spain Brothers released their first album together in 2004, titled Like Others Did Before Us. They recorded a live album on Good Friday 2005, and released the album The Makem and Spain Brothers Live in 2006. They recorded and filmed a live concert in Butte, Montana, releasing both a DVD and a CD of the concert in 2008. Both releases were called The Makem and Spain Brothers Home Away From Home. In January 2011, they released a studio album, titled Up the Stairs.

Shane left the band in 2011 for unknown reasons.

In October 2013, Conor Makem was arrested for allegedly placing a hidden camera in a women's bathroom. The police confiscated his American and Irish passports, which prevented him from participating in the band's annual musical tour of Ireland. Conor Makem was sentenced to a year incarceration at Strafford County House of Corrections in May 2014 after pleading guilty to 19 invasion of privacy charges.

According to their website www.makem.com, the band, now a trio consisting of Rory Makem, Mickey Spain and Liam Spain, was officially renamed Makem & Spain.

In 2012, the Makem and Spain Brothers created their first Kickstarter campaign drive to help fund their next two albums, a two-volume set titled Sessions Vol. 1 and Sessions Vol. 2, which would feature a multitude of guest musicians, including but not limited to Tom Paxton, Schooner Fare, The Shaw Brothers, Gordon Bok and David Mallett. A goal of $15,000 was surpassed, capping out at more than $20,000. After several delays, Makem & Spain Brothers Sessions Vol. 1 saw a limited release in late May 2014 to contributors. On June 3, the album, re-titled Sessions, Vol. I - Makem and Spain, was released on iTunes. Finally, on August 3, it was released on compact disc to the general public. There are two different versions of the album cover; copies distributed to Kickstarter contributors contain the group name "The Makem & Spain Brothers", with photos of all four group members at the time; copies available to purchase by the general public on August 3 and henceforth include the new group name, "Makem & Spain", with photos of just Rory, Mickey and Liam.

On January 12, 2016, Makem and Spain released a new studio album, Four Pounds a Day. It is the 10th full-length album for the group as a whole, excluding the 1992 demo Cassette. According to their Facebook page, , the record was originally called For Ramblin' For Rovin', after lyrics taken from the song "Bold Thady Quill", track number 10 on the album. Sessions Vol. 2 was released on October 6, 2016, making this the first time the group had released two albums in one year. It would be their final album.

== Break up ==
In 2014, Rory Makem, the youngest son of Tommy Makem, started performing as a solo act, in addition to touring and recording with Makem and Spain. Donal Clancy, youngest son of Liam Clancy, released an album of songs, [Songs of a Roving Blade, the first to feature him on vocals as a solo; previously he sang as part of a chorus with his father, Liam, and cousin, Robbie O'Connell, in the group, Clancy O'Connell & Clancy, while focusing on instrumentals. Promoting his album, he began touring as a solo performer that year.

In the summer of 2016, Rory and Donal joined forces at the Milwaukee Irish Festival, performing sporadically for the remainder of the year. They featured as a duo on Joannie Madden's Folk and Irish Cruise that fall, billed as "Makem and Clancy". They toured the American Irish Festival circuit in the summer of 2017, and occasionally tour together as of October 2019, as well as solo.

Makem & Spain performed less than half a dozen concerts during 2017, and on March 5, 2018, they announced on their Facebook page that they were breaking up:

"Hello all. We reluctantly announce that we will no longer be performing as a trio. Rory will be performing with Donal Clancy as well as a solo artist. Mickey will perform as a solo artist as well as with his brother Liam. We would like to thank everyone for the support that you have given us over the years and we hope that you will continue to enjoy, attend and support folk music.

Cheers, Mickey, Rory and Liam"

Their final concert was at the 2nd Annual Folk Extravaganza in Manchester, NH at the Palace Theatre on October 6, 2017.

== Personnel ==
=== Past members ===
- Rory Makem – vocals, six string guitar, twelve string guitar, banjo, mandolin, bouzouki, bodhrán, harmonica, piano (1989–2018)
- Shane Makem - vocals, six string guitar, bass guitar, bodhran (1989–2011)
- Brian Sullivan - six string guitar (1990–1995)
- Conor Makem - vocals, bass guitar, concertina, flute (1991–2014)
- Liam Spain – vocals, guitar, mandolin, bouzouki, harmonica (2003–2018)
- Mickey Spain – vocals, guitar, nylon string guitar, bodhrán (2003–2018)

== Discography ==
Note: The footnotes will take you to lyrics but not necessarily to The Makem Brothers' recordings of these songs, many of which are traditional.

=== The Makem Brothers and Brian Sullivan ===
- The Makem Brothers & Brian Sullivan Demo (1992)
1. "Maid of Fivey"
2. "Ferryman"
3. "Rising of the Moon"
4. "All for Me Grog"
5. "Charlie on the MTA"
- Out Standing in a Field (1994)
1. "Pretty Maggie-O"
2. "Low Lands Low"
3. "Sea Faring Men"
4. "Matty Groves"
5. "Darkley Weaver"
6. "Brennan On The Moor"
7. "Fare Thee Well Enniskillen"
8. "Killicrankie-O"
9. "Hudson River"
10. "Mr. Dunderbatt"
11. "Cruiscin Lan"
12. "A Fond Farewell"

=== The Makem Brothers ===
- On The Rocks (1995)
1. "The Diamond"
2. "Mountjoy Prison" (Rory Makem)
3. "Straw into Gold"
4. "23 June"
5. "Hot Asphalt"
6. "Bonnie Blue Bonnets"
7. "White Cockade"
8. "Bridget O’Shea" (Conor Makem)
9. "Bound Down for Newfoundland"
10. "Old Stone Wall"
11. "Dark Eyed Molly"
12. "Down the Road"
- Who Fears to Speak (1998)
1. "Memory of the Dead"
2. "Sean Bhean-Bhocht"
3. "The Boys of Wexford"
4. "Bold Robert Emmet"
5. "Kelly the Boy from Killane"
6. "Tom McArdle"
7. "Roddy McCorley"
8. "General Monroe"
9. "Bodenstown Churchyard"
10. "Henry Joy"
11. "Twenty Men from Dublin Town"
12. "Rising of the Moon"
- Stand Together (2001)
1. "Farewell to the Rhonda"
2. "Lean and Unwashed Tiffy"
3. "Tinker’s Wedding"
4. "Blackbird" (lyrics: Conor Makem)
5. "Captain Kidd"
6. "Stand Together"
7. "Love, Won’t You Marry Me"
8. "Come to the Bower"
9. "Spanish Stars" (lyrics: Conor Makem)
10. "Fireship"
11. "I’ll Neither Spin Nor Weave" (Lyrics: Conor, Shane Makem)
12. "Liberty"
13. "Kerry Recruit"
14. "Crabber’s Claw" (lyrics: Conor Makem)

=== The Makem Brothers with Mickey and Liam Spain ===
- Like Others Did Before Us (2004)
1. "Road to Gundagai"
2. "Wild and Restless Foam" (Mickey Spain)
3. "Leezie Lindsay"
4. "Sound the Pibroch"
5. "Fincairn Flax"
6. "Whiskey Row" (Liam Spain, Mickey Spain)
7. "Willie’s Gone Awa’"
8. "Down in The Valley"
9. "Paddy Kelly"
10. "Freedom on the Wallaby"
11. "Slan Abhaile" (Conor Makem)
12. "Three Drunken Maidens"
13. "Ha’Penny Bridge"

=== The Makem and Spain Brothers ===
- The Makem and Spain Brothers Live (2006)
1. "Highland Paddy"
2. "MacPherson’s Rant" (a/k/a McPherson's Lament)
3. "Mingulay Boat Song"
4. "New South Wales"
5. "Whiskey Row" (Liam Spain, Mickey Spain)
6. "The Smuggler"
7. "Congo River"
8. "Goodbye to the 30 Foot Trailer"
9. "Road to Gundagai"
10. "Liberty"
11. "Jolly Waggoner"
12. "Queensland Whalers"
13. "When We Danced in Donegal/Tombigbee Waltz"
14. "Calling Me Home"
- Home Away from Home (2008)
1. "Outlawed Rapparee"
2. "Jolly Waggoner"
3. "Mingulay Boat Song"
4. "Queensland Whalers"
5. "When Annie Took Me Home"
6. "Liberty"
7. "Whiskey Row"
8. "Ha'Penny Bridge"
9. "William Kidd"
10. "Never Get Their Man"
11. "When We Danced in Donegal"
12. "The Jolly Beggar"
13. "Lord Nelson"
14. "My Old Man"
15. "Rosa Marie/Bound For Home"
16. "Wild Colonial Home"
17. "Magpie Lullaby"
18. "Home Away From Home"
- Up the Stairs (2011)
1. "Crossroads Ceili"
2. "Maggie Lauder"
3. "Nancy O"
4. "It's Been A Very Hard Year"
5. "Three Nights And A Sunday"
6. "Bright Eyed Girl From Keady"
7. "To Welcome Poor Paddy Home"
8. "Dido Bendigo"
9. "Pat And Bridget"
10. "Kitty From Baltimore"
11. "They Say He Wouldn't Dance"
12. "Tavern Down By The Harbour"
13. "The Lightkeeper"
14. "Fare You Well"

=== Makem and Spain ===
- Sessions, Vol. 1, Makem and Spain (2014)
1. "Roll On Columbia" (feat. Dave Mallett and the Mallett Brothers)
2. "My Creole Belle" (feat. Tom Paxton)
3. "Shenandoah" (feat. Bill Staines)
4. "Glory Train" (feat. Noel Paul Stookey)
5. "Four Strong Winds" (feat. Roger Mcguinn)
6. "Go Tell Aunt Rhody" (Makem and Spain solo)
7. "Run, Come See Jerusalem" (feat. Gordon Bok)
8. "Michael Row the Boat Ashore" (feat. The Shaw Brothers)
9. "Skip to My Lou" (Makem and Spain solo)
10. "Stealin'" (feat. Jonathan Edwards)
11. "I Can't Help but Wonder Where I'm Bound" (feat. Schooner Fare)
12. "The Ballad of the St. Anne's Reel" (feat. Dave Mallett and the Mallett Brothers)
- Four Pounds a Day (2016)
1. "Barnyards of Delgaty"
2. "Four Pounds a Day"
3. "Jug of Punch"
4. "The Hiring Fair"
5. "Santy Anno"
6. "Legion of the Rearguard"
7. "Red Is the Rose"
8. "The Loo"
9. "Drink Up the Cider"
10. "Bold Thady Quill"
11. "The Molly Maguires"
12. "Will Ye' Go Lassie Go"
13. "Nae Awa' to Bide Awa'"
- Sessions, Vol. 2 (2016)
1. "Cindy" (feat. Jonathan Edwards)
2. "Acres of Clams" (feat. Bill Staines)
3. "500 Miles" (feat. Dave Mallett & The Mallett Brothers Band)
4. "Last Train to San Fernando"
5. "Day of the Clipper" (feat. Schooner Fare)
6. "Sloop John B" (feat. Gordon Bok)
7. "Stewball"
8. "2 Little Boys" (feat. The Shaw Brothers)
9. "Jay Goulds Daughter" (feat. Roger McGuinn)
10. "Quite Early Morning"
11. "The Water Is Wide" (feat. Tom Paxton)
12. "Done Laid Around" (feat. Tom Paxton, Roger McGuinn, Schooner Fare, Jonathan Edwards, Dave Malllett, The Mallett Brothers Band, Noel Paul Stookey, The Shaw Brothers, Gordon Bok & Bill Staines)

=== Rory Makem ===
- The EP (2023)
1. "Men Of Worth"
2. "The Curlew"
3. "The Mountains Of Pomeroy"
4. "Down Derry Down"
5. "Home Boys Home"
