= David Mallet =

David Mallet is the name of:

- David Mallet (writer) (c. 1705–1765), Scottish poet and dramatist
- David Mallet (director) (fl. 1970s–2010s), British director

== See also ==
- David Mallett (1951–2024), American singer-songwriter
- David Malet Armstrong (1926–2014), Australian philosopher
