= Breaker (Vary Lumar album) =

Studio album by Vary Lumar
- Released: November 18, 2014
- Studio: 37' Productions in Rockland, Massachusetts
- Genre: Alternative rock
- Length: 34:00
- Label: Swoom Records
- Producer: Sean McLaughlin, Vary Lumar

Vary Lumar chronology
The Jig is Up (2011)	Breaker (2014)

Singles from Breaker
- 1. "Murderer" Released: October 20, 2014; 2. "Slips" Released: November 17, 2014; 3. "Dent" Released: March 24, 2015

Breaker is the third studio album by the Boston alternative rock band Vary Lumar. Experiencing a lull in morale following the exit of original guitarist Ben Case, the band found themselves revitalized after a string of singles and performances with new member Christopher G. Brown. Working again with longtime producer Sean McLaughlin at 37' Productions, the band spent much of the Summer of 2014 tracking the album. A successful Kickstarter campaign enabled the album to be released on vinyl.

Breaker was released to local acclaim, with the Boston Herald, The Noise, and DigBoston all praising the energy and composition of the album.

== Track listing ==
All tracks are written by De Pasquale/Brown/Laff/Fusco.

No.	Title	Length
1.	"Breaker"	4:28
2.	"Paperweight"	4:18
3.	"Slips"	4:26
4.	"The Prince"	1:51
5.	"Murderer"	4:27
6.	"Doesn't Mean Anything"	4:20
7.	"Grover"	4:59
8.	"Dent"	5:11

== Personnel ==
Vary Lumar

- Paul DePasquale: lead vocals, guitars, keyboards, programming
- Christopher G. Brown: guitars, keyboards, programming
- Robert Laff: bass guitar, baritone guitar, keyboards, organ
- Ron Fusco: drums, percussion

Additional personnel

- Sean McLaughlin: recording engineer, mixer, producer
- Jeff Lipton: mastering
- Maria Rice: mastering assistant
- Executive Producer: Nikki DePasquale, Music and Motion Studios LLC
- Executive Producer: Dan Ameen
- Photography by Divided by Xero
- Packaging design by Chimmy and Flap
