= Brobst =

Brobst is a surname. Notable people with the surname include:

- Annie Brobst (born 1985), American singer-songwriter
- Stephen Brobst (born 1962), American technology executive
