= Cold Engines =

American rock band

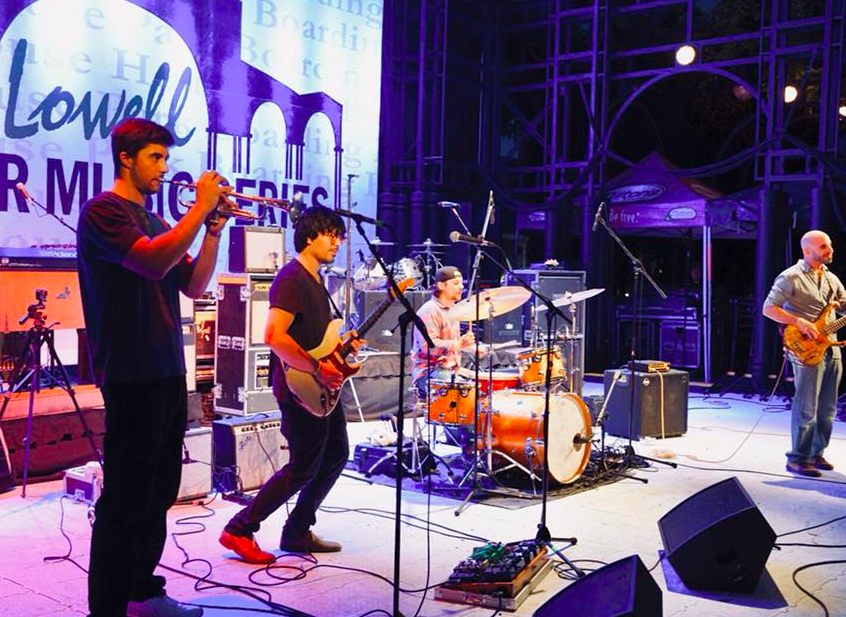
- Cold Engines on stage 2018

Background information
- Origin: Boston, Massachusetts, U.S.
- Genres: dance-rock; alternative rock; new wave; R&B; soul music; smooth soul; indie-rock
- Years active: 2014–present
- Label: Cold Engines
- Members: Dave Drouin; Aaron Zaroulis; Adam Saylor; Geoff Pilkington; Seth Campbell
- Website: coldengines.com

Cold Engines is an American rock band from Boston, Massachusetts, United States, composed of Dave Drouin (guitar and vocals), Aaron Zaroulis (drums and vocals), Adam Saylor (bass and vocals) and Geoff Pilkington (percussion). The band was founded in 2014 by Boston session guitarist and songwriter, Dave Drouin and has since released sixteen studio albums. Cold Engines was awarded 'Rock Act of the Year' at the New England Music Awards in both 2016 and 2022 and was nominated for 'Song of the Year' at the 2017 NEMA awards for the single, "Show You Crazy." Critics note the group's use of intricate vocal harmonies and describe their sound as a blend of rock fueled R&B and Soul music. Cold Engines is known by fans for their virtuosic live performances and have supported touring American rock bands Blues Traveler, Bobby Keyes, Rustic Overtones, Michael McDonald, Soule Monde, Mihali, Space Junk and Los Lobos.

In 2021 Cold Engines released a series of full-length studio albums. On January 1, came their sixth record, “The Last Resort” a rock opera based on the Paul Verhoeven directed 1990 the Sci-Fi film, Total Recall. This concept album was received favorably with press making note of its urgency and lyrical depth. In May 2021 Cold Engines released "One Of Us Now" which critics noted as having a lush and romantic vocal aesthetic. The following record, Couyon, was released on June 4, 2021, and quickly became a fan favorite for its variety of instrumentation, colorful rhythms and passionate vocal performances. The band explored new territory with their next release, Gargantua, a heavy metal influenced concept album based on the story of an interplanetary soldier trapped in orbit around a supermassive black hole. With their final album of 2021, Cold Engines changed gears again with Flower Covered Hills. Acoustic instruments were featured in this album which was noted for its honesty and sweetness as well as its dreamy and cinematic qualities.

Following Flower Covered Hills, Cold Engines released three additional albums in this acoustic instrument themed series. In 2026, the band released Madman, featuring the singles "Confident Woman," "Nightfall," and "To Know You." Coverage of "Nightfall" highlighted its blend of funk, progressive rock, and horn arrangements, while "To Know You" was noted for its vintage rock-pop influences and dance-oriented sound. The band also released Surf's Down (2026), drawing inspiration from the classic surf rock sound of the 1960s.

Guest musicians appearing on Cold Engines recordings include: Amelia Gormley, Eric Reingold, Matt Pynn, Jon Persson, John Funkhouser, Emily Garcia, Alice Austin, Chris Plante, Jordan Holt, Adam Ezra, Audrey Ryan, Johnny Bluehorn, Andrew Fogliano, and Ben Alleman with Tim Phillips heading up the New York based recording team.

== Discography ==
=== Studio albums ===
- Day Drinker (2014)
- Take Me With You (2015)
- Better Off Dead (2016)
- Physical Education (2017)
- Kiss My Heart (2019)
- The Last Resort (2021)
- Still Here. Still Gone. (2021)
- One Of Us Now (2021)
- Couyon (2021)
- Gargantua (2021)
- Flower Covered Hills (2021)
- Flower Covered Hills Chapter 2 (2022)
- Flower Covered Hills the Final Chapter (2023)
- Flower Covered Hills the Return (2026)
- Madman (2026)
- Surf's Down (2026)
