= Suicide Dolls (band) =

The Suicide Dolls
- Origin: New London, Connecticut, US
- Genres: Garage rock; punk; alternative; noise rock; experimental; garage punk
- Years active: 2002–present
- Labels: unsigned
- Members: Brian Albano; Michelle Montavon; Matt Covey

The Suicide Dolls are a punk-rock-pop noise trio from New London, Connecticut. Bassist Michelle Montavon and guitarist Brian Albano were contributors to the underground music scenes of New London and Providence in the mid to late-90s, as part of experimental all-noise projects. In 2002, they formed the Suicide Dolls and worked to incorporate more of a pop and rock structure into the organic noise projects, and deliver it to a larger audience.

The band had recorded and toured with drummers Brahm Fetterman (2005), Matt Covey (2006), and later with Joe Reed (2007), before reuniting with Matt Covey in 2009. The trio recorded their latest album, "Prayers In Parking Lots" in April 2011, at Q Division Studios in Somerville, Massachusetts, and released it in January, 2012.

The band has toured the New England coast extensively and has consistently worked to develop connections and collaborations between music communities in New York and Boston with the music community in New London. They have generated particular interest for their music in the Boston market, where the singles "Drive" and "Elizabeth" from "Prayers In Parking Lots" have received regular airplay from several Boston radio stations since early 2012. The CD has also generated critical interest for the band, and they were named "Best New Act of the Year" in the 2012 New England Music Awards, as well as being requested to appear on the 2012 Repo Man tribute album, which celebrates the punk movement of the late 70s and early 80s.

== Members ==
- Brian Albano – guitar, vocals
- Michelle Montavon – bass, vocals
- Matt Covey – drums

== Discography ==
- The Suicide Dolls – 2005
- "Thank You, Trooper" – 2007
- CosmoSingles – 2009, 2010, 2011
- "Prayers In Parking Lots" – 2011
