= Vary Lumar =

American alt-rock band

- Origin: Boston, Massachusetts, U.S.
- Genres: Alternative rock
- Years active: 2004–present
- Members: Paul DePasquale; Rob Fusco; Robert Laff; Christopher G. Brown
- Past members: Ben Case
- Website: varylumar.com

Vary Lumar is an alternative rock band based out of Boston, Massachusetts, formed in 2004.

== History ==
While attending Berklee College of Music, Paul DePasquale, Robert Laff, and Rob Fusco formed the core of Vary Lumar. After playing with a few different lead guitarists, Ben Case settled into the role as the band recorded their debut EP, The Cold Heart Bru Hah Hah.

After a lengthy recording process with producer Sean McLaughlin, Vary Lumar released their first full-length album Waiting Room. The album was declared Album of the Month by Performer Magazine, and the band went on an East Coast tour. Fusco briefly left the band as they recorded follow-up EP Plasticolor Coma, and rejoined as they began work on their second full-length again with McLaughlin producing. Singer Paul DePasquale was diagnosed with Hodgkin's Lymphoma during the process, which informed the content of 2011's The Jig is Up. Like its predecessors, The Jig is Up received coverage from notable Boston publications such as DigBoston, The Boston Phoenix, and The Noise. In addition to the local acclaim, Vary Lumar's music was appearing in commercials and promotions for Anthropologie, W Magazine featuring January Jones, and Bassike.

After a series of promotional concerts behind The Jig is Up, Case left the band to pursue other interests. The band continued as a trio, recording two singles and ultimately released an EP entitled Capture in 2013. Capture received year-end accolades from Vanyaland and the music video for lead single "Hold it Against Me" was debuted by The LFB. Christopher G. Brown joined the band as a permanent fourth member on guitar and synthesizers, and the now-four piece quickly recorded and released a trio of new singles.

2014 saw Vary Lumar participating in 2014's WBCN Rock & Roll Rumble at T.T. the Bear's Place in Cambridge, MA and launching a successful Kickstarter campaign to fund the release of their next full-length on vinyl. The resulting album, Breaker, was released in December and received considerable amounts of press. The band spent 2015 promoting Breaker with live shows and working on new music for its follow-up.

== Band members ==
=== Current members ===
- Paul DePasquale – lead vocals, guitar, keyboards (2004–present)
- Robert Laff – bass guitar, guitar, keyboards (2004–present)
- Rob Fusco – drums, keyboards (2004–present)
- Christopher G. Brown – guitar, keyboards (2013–present)

=== Former members ===
- Ben Case – guitar (2004–2011)

== Discography ==
=== Studio albums ===
- Waiting Room (2008)
- The Jig is Up (2011)
- Breaker (2014)
- Little Steep Decay (2018)

=== Singles ===
- "It's / OK We're / OK" (2011)
- "In Focus" (2014)
- "Slave" (2014)
- "Reflections in the Sky" (2014)
- "Murderer" (2014)

=== EPs ===
- "The Cold Heart Bru Hah Ha" (2006)
- "Plasticolor Coma" (2009)
- "Capture" (2013)
