= Jeff & Greg Burns =

American composers

Jeff & Greg Burns (born December 16, 1969) are American composers of electronic and orchestral music, best known for their contributions to the CBS’ police procedural drama NCIS. and "NCIS:New Orleans". The team have also co-composed music for such film and television projects as Andy Richter Controls the Universe, Heist, Listen Up, Notorious C.H.O., and Mattel's animated series Max Steel.

== Early life and career ==
Jeff & Greg were born in Kingsville, Texas, but spent much of their childhood traveling the world as Navy brats before settling in Albuquerque, New Mexico. They attended Boston’s Berklee College of Music in 1993, then relocated to Los Angeles(1995) where they worked as assistant recording engineers with such international icons as Michael Jackson, Green Day, Eminem, Brian Wilson, Aerosmith, Joni Mitchell and Alanis Morissette at Ocean Way Recording.

== Other musical projects ==
Jeff and Greg Burns comprise the big-beat, electronic group SuperTweeker r, whose music has been included in such video games as: "Final Fight: Streetwise" and "Rhythm Racer 2". They also comprise, along with longtime writing partner Brian Kirk, Solamingus, whose song The Classics won an award in the electronica category at the 2006 Just Plain Folks Music Awards. And in 2009, the Solamingus track Satellite 2009 was included on NCIS: The Official TV Soundtrack.
