= Karmina =

American musical duo

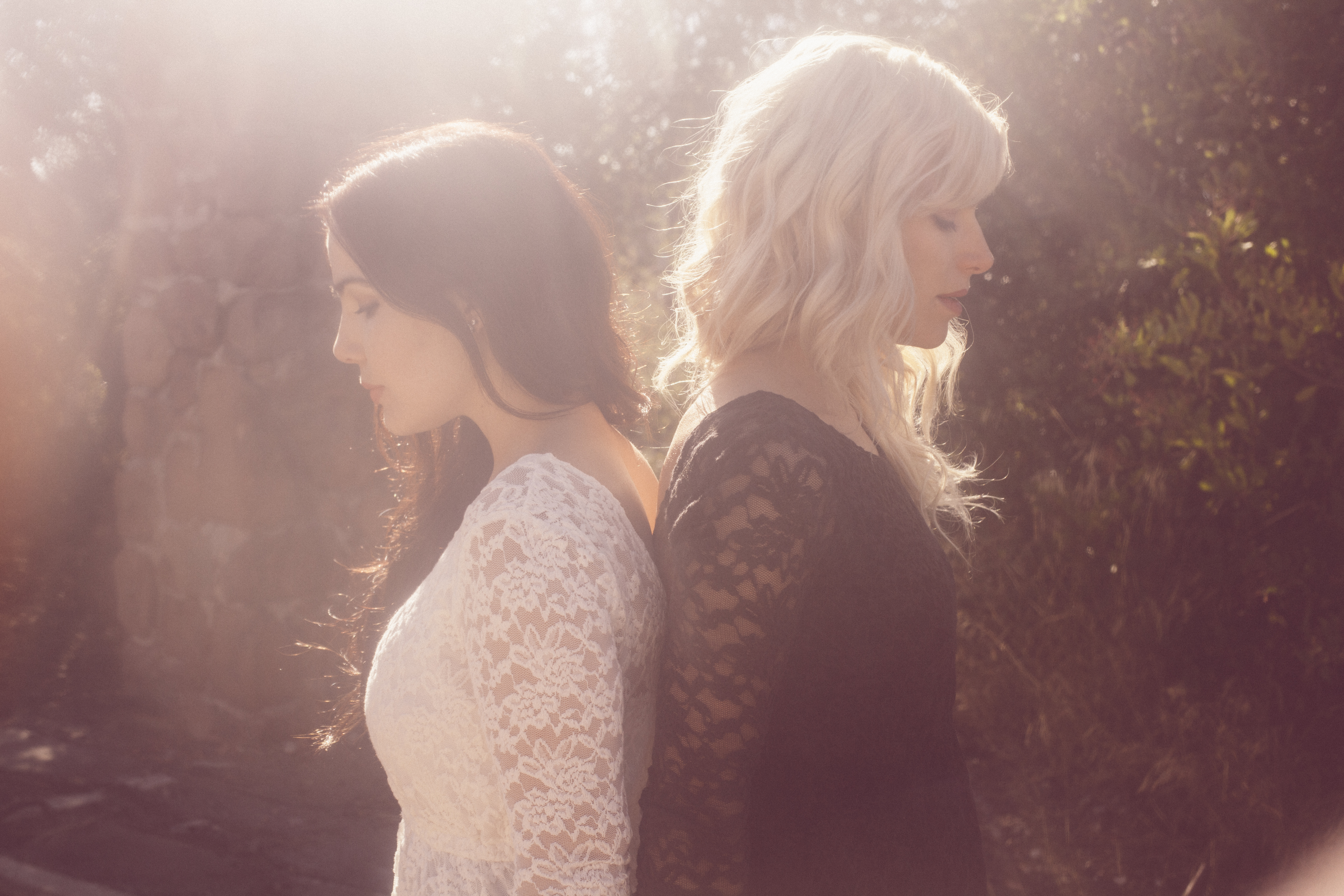
- (From left-to-right) Kamille Rudisill and Kelly Rudisill as Karmina

Background information
- Origin: San Francisco, California, United States
- Genres: Indie pop
- Years active: 2006–present
- Labels: CBS, KKR
- Members: Kelly Rudisill; Kamille Rudisill
- Website: karmina.com

Karmina is an American indie pop music duo of sister singer-songwriters Kelly Adams (née Rudisill) (lead vocals, harmonies, keyboards) and Kamille Rudisill (lead vocals, harmonies, guitars). Kelly and Kamille write, sing, produce and perform music that entwines their classical training and pop influences.

== Biography ==
Kelly was born in Germany and Kamille in Hawaii where both girls were raised before moving with their family to San Francisco. When the girls were only ten and eight years old respectively, their mother enrolled them in the San Francisco Conservatory of Music where they took classes that included music theory, composition and classical voice training. They have one other sister, Petra Karmina Rudisill (born 1997).

Before naming the band Karmina, the duo also went by the names Kalabash and Kelly & Kamille. They ultimately settled on Karmina, which means “song” in Latin and is also the title of one of their favorite operas, “Carmina Burana” (or “Songs of Bayern”). Karmina is also their sister Petra's middle name.

Kelly was a skilled soccer player and made it to an Olympic development team. Kamille was winning dance competitions and sang classically; David Foster teamed her with Josh Groban to perform at fund-raising events.

Karmina soon became successful, competing in prestigious music competitions—among them, the John Lennon Songwriting Contest, ASCAP’s Lester Sill Songwriters’ Workshop, the San Francisco Concerto Orchestra Competition and the California State Vocal competition, which they have won twenty-seven times.

Karmina's first national exposure came when they won Disney Channel's "Two Hour Tour” competition which led to Darren Hayes of Savage Garden mentoring the girls and selecting them to open for his band in San Francisco at the Fillmore Auditorium.

After eight years in San Francisco, the duo moved to Los Angeles where they attended the Thornton School of Music at the University of Southern California and earned Bachelor of Music degrees in music industry. Kelly went on to receive a master's degree in music education, as well as a teaching credential.

In 2014, Kelly married James Adams, and they have one child together.

== Career ==
Karmina's music education paid off when a copy of the band's demo music found its way to an executive at the newly formed CBS Records. The record company's management team approached the duo in December 2006, laid out their vision for the new label and immediately offered Karmina a place on the roster.

Karmina was one of the first acts signed to the newly inaugurated CBS Records. They released their debut album Backwards into Beauty (produced by Karmina and Guy Erez) in 2008. The title of the album comes from a lyric in the album's first track, “Satellites”, and it sums up the album's overall concept. The album also features engineers, Stewart Cararas and Brian Yaskulka.

The group's first single “The Kiss” deals with the theme of forbidden love which was influenced by Romeo and Juliet, and paraphrases Shakespeare in its lyrics. "The Kiss" reached number 24 on Billboard's Adult Contemporary chart. The music video for “The Kiss” includes footage of real-life couples who have had to overcome bigotry, the judgement of their friends and family, and the pressures of society. The video also features reality TV personality Amanda Ireton. The song has been released and was featured in several shows including 90210 and on the upcoming promo of CSI: NY which features the couple Danny Messer and Lindsay Monroe perhaps getting married. Also, Karmina's "The Whoa Song" was used where Messer and Monroe had their first kiss at the end of season 2, but the scene was removed before the episode aired. The scene can be watched on-line and is shown in a flashback when Messer and Monroe get married.

Several of the songs from their album have been featured on network TV, including NCIS, Cane and NUMB3RS on CBS, the CW's newly revamped hit 90210 and Life Is Wild. Karmina was also featured on-camera performing their song “Walk You Home” on A&E's hit series The Cleaner, starring Benjamin Bratt. They made their performing debut on national broadcast television December 21, 2007, appearing with Sheryl Crow, Fergie, Carole King, James Blunt and Reba McEntire on the CBS holiday special, A Home for the Holidays, playing a song they wrote at the request of the producers.

Since then, Kelly and Kamille have toured the United States, United Kingdom and Europe (sponsored by Apple) and made a new record with composer John Powell, titled Queens of Heart.

Their original track "All the King's Horses" was included on season 2 episode 19 of American TV series Reign.

== Discography ==
- Backwards into Beauty (2008)
- Car Train Ship Plane (2012)
- Queens of Heart (2020)
