= The Furies (band) =

American indie rock band

- Origin: Providence, Rhode Island, U.S.
- Genres: Indie, pop rock
- Years active: 2010–present
- Labels: Mint 400 Records

The Furies are an American indie rock band from Rhode Island.

== History ==
The Furies are a five-piece indie band from Providence, Rhode Island, that formed in 2010. Singer and guitarist Lee Moretti started the Furies after finishing touring with the rock band, Third Eye Blind, as a multi-instrumentalist and backing vocalist. Moretti released her first song "Keep Away" in 2011, which features Brad Hargreaves on drums, Abe Millet on bass and Stephan Jenkins on tambourine. Jenkins also recorded and produced the song. All the members are female, and graduates of Berklee College of Music, and the Frost School of Music. Their music is described as having "tight harmonies, layered instrumentation, and an immensely positive energy." The band describes themselves as "fever-fem," and mention the Dead Weather, Led Zeppelin, Regina Spektor, and Jeff Buckley as musical influences. Their first performance was a record release show at the Boston Hard Rock Cafe, on April 9, 2011.

=== Omens ===
In 2014, the Furies released the single "Hunter," described by Telegram & Gazette as a "beautiful, sexy and wholly immersive song, one that’s devoid of sentimentality and that captures this all-consuming sort of heartbreak with frightening alacrity." The music video for "Hunter" alternates between the band playing in a studio and the members walking through the woods, each of them gathering items they discover; a toy boat, flowers, a stick, a tarot card and an animal skull. As the video closes the band comes together and load the items onto a small wooden boat, and set it adrift. The song appears on the six-track EP, Omens, which was released on November 13, 2015. That year the Furies toured across the United States. A 2015 piece by Tyler Pearce of City Newspaper, describes the Furies music as "rock guitars [with] weighted body, while snare and hi-hat give texture and groove to a beautiful vocal-forward sound with lush harmonies." They won the 2018 New England Music Award for Best in State Rhode Island. Omens was digitally reissued with Mint 400 Records, on March 5, 2019.

The Furies have shared the stage with the Ataris, Big Scary, Howie Day, the Indigo Girls, Joan Baez, and Mary Chapin Carpenter. They are currently recording an album, scheduled for release in 2021.

== Personnel ==
- AJ Kostromina – drums
- Lee Moretti – vocals and guitar
- Elise Frawley – viola
- Sus Vasquez – lead guitar and vocals
- Gabby Sherba – bass and vocals

Past / Aux members

- Sonya Rae Taylor – lead guitar and vocals
- Maddie Rice - lead guitar and vocals
- Jas Kayser - drums
- Giulliana Merello - drums

== Discography ==
EPs

- Omens (2015 / 2021 re-release)

Singles

- Between the Lines (2024)
- Keep Away (2011)
