= Sean McLaughlin (music producer) =

American record producer

- Occupations: Record producer, audio engineer
- Website: theseanmclaughlin.com

Sean McLaughlin is an American record producer and audio engineer.
He has won thrice the Producer of the Year Awards at New England Music Awards in 2013, 2018 and 2019. He also won the Studio Producer of the Year Award at Boston Music Awards in 2019. McLaughlin founded 37’ Productions, a music recording studio based in Boston, in 2004. McLaughlin has assisted and collaborated with producers such as Andy Johns, Jimbo Barton and Carmen Rizzo. He has worked with a variety of bands and musicians, including Matchbox Twenty, Queensrÿche, Rush, Dirty Vegas, Sarah Blacker, Kristen Merlin, Yoan Garneau, Rafael Moreira, Dark New Day, Elliott Smith, Death Row Records, among many others. McLaughlin is also an assistant professor in the Music Production and Engineering Major at Berklee.
He authored and published Mixing with iZotope, a mixing guide about the process of mixing recorded audio by iZotope.
