= Sharon Little =

American singer-songwriter

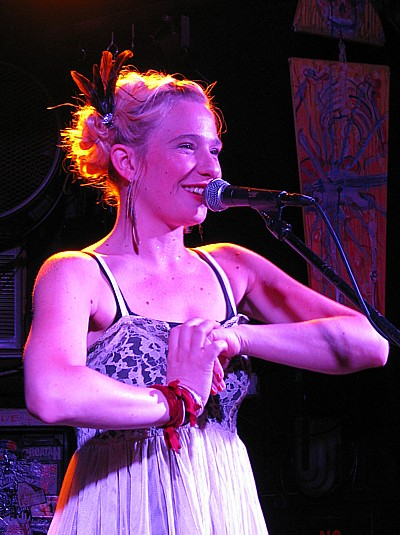
- Little performing in June 2011

Background information
- Born: 1980 (age 45–46)
- Origin: North Wales, Pennsylvania, U.S.
- Genres: R&B, blues, soul, pop
- Years active: 2006–present
- Labels: Winding Way Records (2019), CBS Records (2006)
- Website: sharonlittle.com

Sharon Little (born c. 1980) is an American singer-songwriter from North Wales, Pennsylvania.

== Early life ==
Little was born in Philadelphia. She attended North Penn High School in Montgomery County, Pennsylvania.

== Career ==
While working as a waitress in Philadelphia, Little performed with local bands and independently released an album, Drawing Circles, in 2006 before being signed to CBS Records in early 2008. She was subsequently chosen as the opening act for Robert Plant, Alison Krauss, and T Bone Burnett on their North American Raising Sand tour.

Little's first album with CBS, Perfect Time for a Breakdown, was released on May 27 of that year. As part of her deal with CBS Records, several of her songs have been featured on CBS programs such as NUMB3RS and NCIS. The song "Follow That Sound" from Perfect Time for a Breakdown was also chosen as the theme for the A&E series The Cleaner. She performed the song in the show's fourth episode and another track from that album, "Spaceship," in a sequence shot in New York's 34th Street subway station for an episode of CSI: NY.

Little continued touring through 2008 and 2009 with, among others, Chris Isaak, Al Green and Jonny Lang. Perfect Time for a Breakdown reached No. 48 on the Billboard Heatseekers chart. Paper Doll, Sharon's newest album, was produced by Grammy-winner Don Was and is set for release in early 2011. Select tracks, including the title track "Paper Doll" and "Shake and Shiver," will be digitally released in advance of the album, in the fall of 2010.

=== Another Galaxy ===
Sharon Little joined Winding Way Records (Philadelphia, PA) to complete a new five song EP “Another galaxy” in 2022. The album was produced by Tim Sonnefeld - a Grammy nominated and award-winning producer (Elvis Costello – “Look Now”, Usher – “Raymond V Raymond”, Dixie Hummingbirds – “Last man standing”, Wanderlust, Kira Alejandro, and Ella Beyer).

=== Perfect Time for a Breakdown ===
Released in May 2008 just prior to embarking on a national tour with Robert Plant, Alison Krauss, and T Bone Burnett for their Raising Sand album, Perfect Time for a Breakdown was Sharon Little's first release for CBS Records. It also continued her collaboration with songwriting partner Scot Sax (formerly of the band Wanderlust). Containing 11 original compositions, including the lead track "Follow That Sound", which became the theme song for the Benjamin Bratt series on A&E's The Cleaner. The album received critical acclaim from many prominent media outlets, including USA Today and Rolling Stone, which wrote that, "Little's debut, Perfect Time for a Breakdown, showcases her deep, husky vocals over country-tinged folk rock that recalls Sheryl Crow and Jewel."

Songs from Perfect Time for a Breakdown has been featured on numerous TV programs, including NCIS, Ghost Whisperer, CSI: NY, NUMB3RS, and The Good Wife, and has sold over 20,000 copies to date.

=== Paper Doll ===
Returning to the studio, this time with producer Don Was, Sharon Little's recording for CBS Records has ten songs and uses pop, rock, R&B and electronic soul. Two of its tracks, "Paper Doll" and "Shake and Shiver," will be released on a digital EP, along with a remix version of "Shake and Shiver" and a live version of another album track, "Pluto," in the fall of 2010. Release of the full album is unknown.

== List of Little songs featured in television programs ==
Song Title	Show	Episode Title	Original U.S. Airdate	Notes
"Genie in My Dreams"	NCIS	"Masquerade"	June 2010	
"Follow That Sound"	The Good Wife	"Boom"	April 2010	
"Ooh Wee"	Ghost Whisperer	"Implosion"	March 2010	
"Ooh Wee"	Ghost Whisperer	"Do Over"	October 2009	
"What Gets in the Way"	Numb3rs	"Animal Rites"	April 2009	
"Accidenaltly"	Numb3rs	"Sneakerhead"	February 2009	
"Peppermint & Glue"	NCIS	"Love and War"	January 2009	
"Spaceship"	CSI: NY	"Help"	January 2009	On air performance
"Try"	CSI: NY		January 2009	Promos
"Follow That Sound"	Sons of Anarchy	"AK-51"	October 2008	
"Follow That Sound"	The Cleaner		August 2008	On air performance
"Follow That Sound"	The Cleaner		July 2008	Main Title
"Spaceship"	Novel Adventures	"4"		
"Try"	Novel Adventures	"2"		
"Follow That Sound"	Novel Adventures	"1"		

== Discography ==
=== Albums ===
- Drawing Circles (2006)
- Perfect Time for a Breakdown (2008)
- Paper Doll (2010)
- Hole in My Heart (2016)
- Another Galaxy (2022)
