= CBS Records (2006) =

Defunct American record label

- Parent company: CBS Corporation
- Founded: 2006; 20 years ago
- Founder: Les Moonves
- Defunct: 2017; 9 years ago
- Distributors: RED Distribution (Sony Music Entertainment)
- Genre: Various
- Country of origin: United States
- Location: Los Angeles, California; CBS Television City

CBS Records was a record label founded by CBS Corporation in 2006 to take advantage of music from its entertainment properties owned by CBS Studios. The initial label roster consisted of only three artists: rock band Señor Happy and singer/songwriters Will Dailey and P.J. Olsson.

The label relied primarily on digital distribution such as iTunes and on direct sales from its own website. However, it signed a deal to distribute compact discs through RED Distribution, a subsidiary of Sony Music Entertainment which CBS Inc. formerly owned. CBS Records was headquartered at Television City in Los Angeles.

The "CBS Records" name was also used in the 1960s to release Columbia Records products outside the US and Canada. This was necessary because EMI owned another record label called Columbia, which operated in every market except North America, Spain and Japan. CBS sold the record company in 1988 to Sony. In 1991, the CBS label was officially renamed Columbia Records and the company was renamed Sony Music Entertainment.

== Artists ==
- Will Dailey
- Keaton Simons
- Karmina
- Sharon Little
- P.J. Olsson
- Señor Happy
- The Wilshires
- You Are I Am

=== Soundtracks ===
- 90210
- NCIS

== Discography ==
Artist	Album	Details
Will Dailey	Back Flipping Forward	Released: 2007
P.J. Olsson	American Scream	Released: 2007
Keaton Simons	Can You Hear Me	Released: 2008
Sharon Little	Perfect Time For A Breakdown	Released: 2008
Karmina	Backwards Into Beauty	Released: 2008
Karmina	Karmina For Christmas-EP	Released: 2008
Various	NCIS: The Official TV Soundtrack	Released: 2009
Will Dailey	Torrent Volumes 1 & 2 - Fashion Of Distraction / By The Blue Hills	Released: 2009
Various	90210	Released: 2009
Stars Crashing Cars	Lie To The Sun	Released: 2009
Various	NCIS: The Official TV Soundtrack Vol. 02	Released: 2009
Sharon Little	First Cut A Sneak Peek EP	Released: 2010

== See also ==
- List of record labels
