= ZUMIX =

Non-profit cultural organization

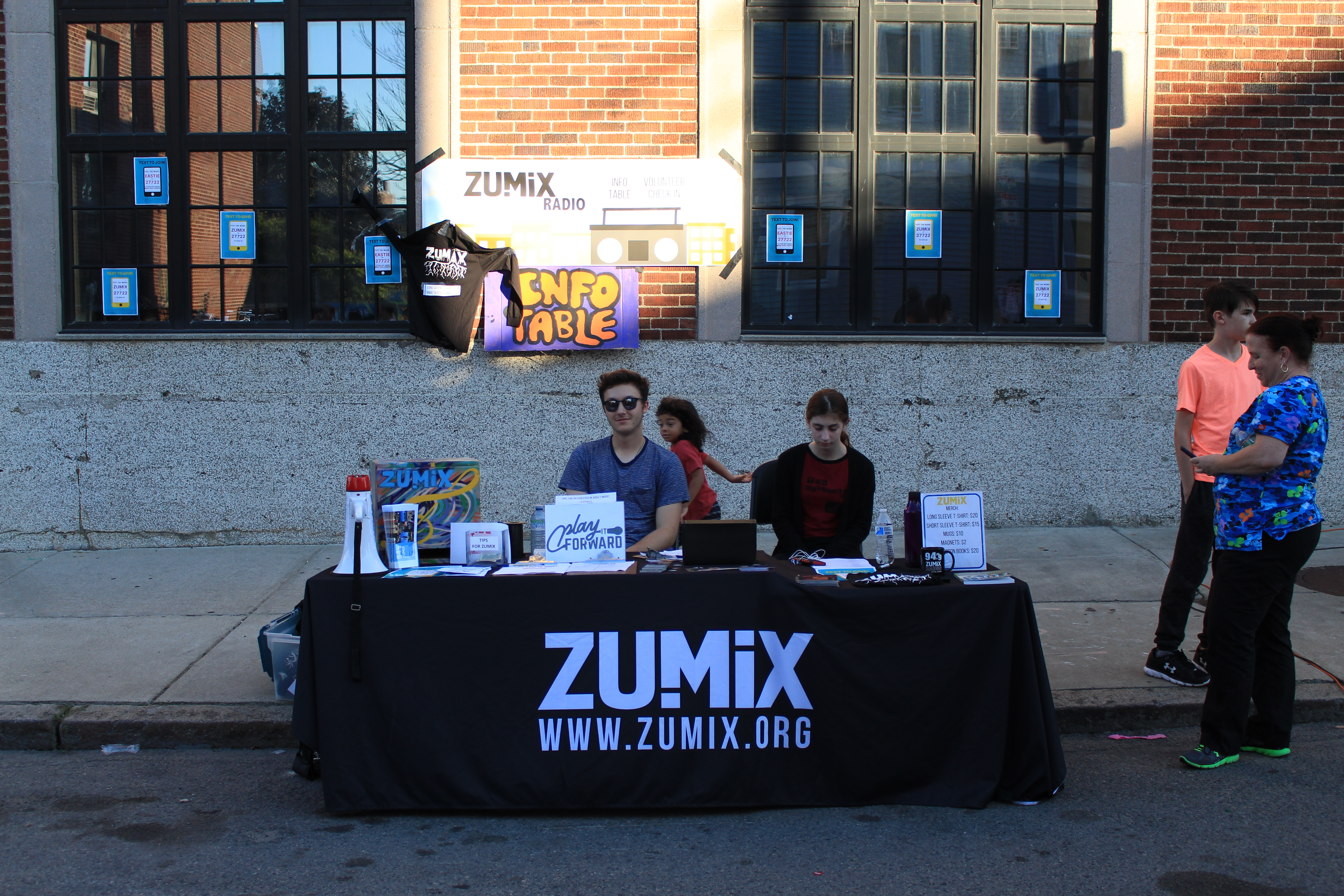
- Founded: 1991
- Founder: Madeleine Steczynski; Bob Grove
- Location(s): 260 Sumner Street East Boston, Massachusetts 02128
- Coordinates: 42.368°N 71.038°W
- Website: Official site

ZUMIX is a non-profit cultural organization located in East Boston, Massachusetts. The organization is dedicated to using the arts, particularly music, to build community, foster cultural understanding, and encourage self-expression among urban youth in the neighborhood. ZUMIX works primarily with low-income or at-risk youth, ranging from ages eight to eighteen. The non-profit serves more than 500 youth annually through after-school and summer programming and an additional 500 through in-school partnerships. More than 10,000 additional adults, children, and families attend ZUMIX's community events and festivals.

== History ==
ZUMIX was founded in 1991 as a small-scale operation run out of the homes of co-founders Madeleine Steczynski and Bob Grove. It was founded as their response to a growing number of homicides among youth in Boston. Addressing the problems of escalating violence, substance abuse, and mortality, the organization sought to provide alternative ways for youth to deal with these issues. The Firehouse, ZUMIX's current headquarters, was sold by the City of Boston to ZUMIX in 2005, and now serves as the central space for ZUMIX's programs, performances, and community events.

== Mission ==
ZUMIX's official mission statement is as follows:

"ZUMIX empowers young people to build successful futures for themselves, transforming lives and community through music, technology, and creative employment."

== Programs ==
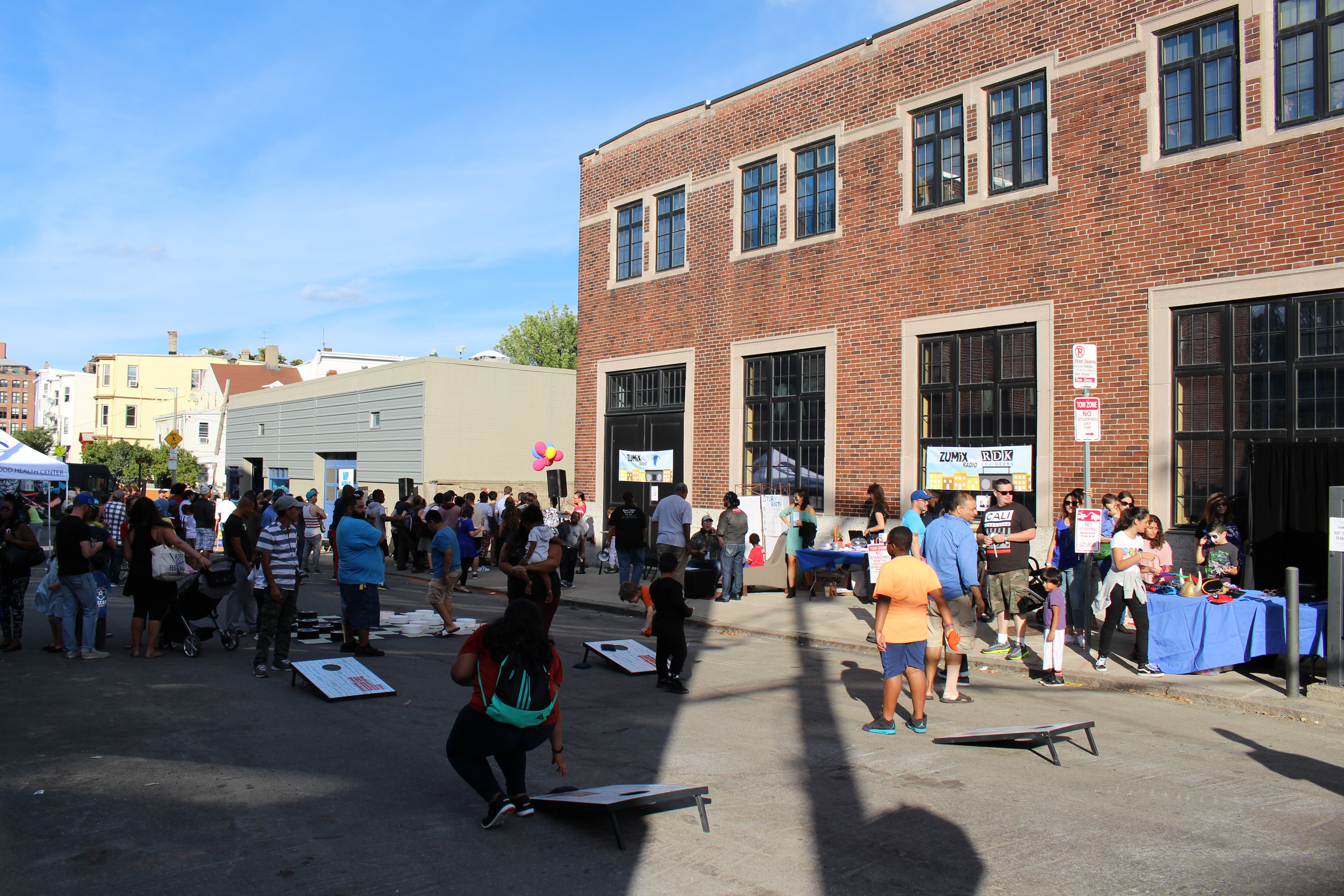
block party 2016

ZUMIX offers programs in creative media and technology, songwriting, performance, radio, and instrumental music. There is also a ZUMIX Sprouts program which teaches music, theater, and more for ages 7 to 11. ZUMIX Radio broadcasts on WZMR-LP 94.9 FM, on which the radio program provides a space for youth to learn and refine radio skills.

== Partnerships ==
ZUMIX has partnered with many foundations and prominent organizations based in Boston such as Converse, Bank of America, Northeastern University, AmeriCorps, Liberty Mutual, and the Red Sox.
