= Goodsell =

Goodsell is an English surname. Notable people with the surname include:

- Charles Goodsell, professor emeritus at Virginia Tech's Center for Public Administration and Policy
- David Goodsell, Molecular biologist and science illustrator
- Elihu Goodsell (1806–1880), American politician
- Jonas Platt Goodsell (1819–1869), American civil engineer and politician from New York
- Louis F. Goodsell (1847–1924), New York politician
- Major Goodsell, Australian who five times won the professional World Sculling Championship
- William Goodsell Rockefeller (1870–1922), director of the Consolidated Textile Company

== See also ==
- Goodsell House, historic home located at Old Forge in Herkimer County, New York
- Goodsell Observatory, building on the campus of Carleton College in Northfield, Minnesota
