= Annie Brobst =

American singer-songwriter

- Born: May 11, 1985 (age 41); Columbus, Ohio
- Genre: Country
- Occupation: Singer-songwriter
- Instrument: Vocals
- Years active: 2007-present

Annie Brobst (born May 11, 1985) is a country music singer-songwriter from Ohio.

== Biography ==
Brobst was born in Columbus, Ohio. After moving to Boston, Massachusetts in 2007, she self-released one EP titled Ghost. She then moved to Salem, Massachusetts where she taught Spanish at a charter school. She won an award for best female country singer in her district. Brobst released her second album, My First Rodeo, in 2018. She now sings as her career with her most popular song reaching 5,000 views. Brobst released her latest album, Holler & Swaller, in March 2021.

== Discography ==
=== Albums ===
Title	Details
Ghost	Release date: September 25, 2016; Formats: CD, download
My First Rodeo	Release date: June 2, 2018; Formats: CD, download
"Where We Holler"	Release date: March 30, 2021; Formats: Compact Disc (album), Streaming (music)
