= Mallett Brothers Band =

American rock band

The Mallet Brothers Band
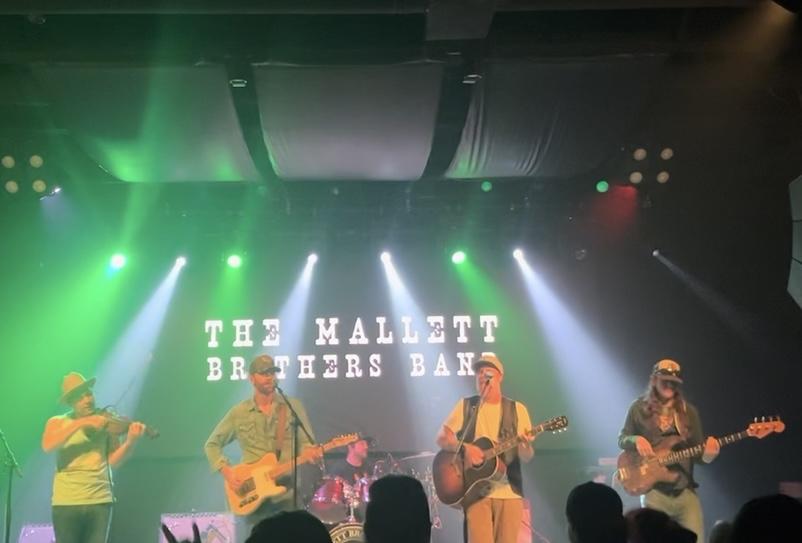
- The Mallet Brothers Band performing at Putnam Place in Saratoga Springs, New York in 2024.

Background information
- Origin: Portland, Maine
- Genres: Alternative country; Rock; Americana
- Years active: 2009–present
- Members: Luke Mallett; Will Mallett; Nick Leen; Andrew Martelle; Brian Higgins
- Past members: Nate Soule; Matt Mills; Wally Wenzel; Charles Gagne
- Website: www.mallettbrothersband.com

The Mallet Brothers Band is an American rock band from Portland, Maine. The band is led by brothers Luke and Will Mallett. Their sound is a self-described mix of country, Americana, roots rock, and jam rock. Since their formation, they have toured continuously, and performed at many large venues and festivals across New England and the United States.

== History ==
The band was formed in 2009 by Luke and Will Mallett, the sons of folk singer-songwriter David Mallett, who the brothers were introduced to music through. Will formed the group with his brother after Luke had finished with another local band in Portland, and they both were interested in starting a group with an "old fashioned country sound". Bassist Nick Leen had recruited the rest of the group, which continued to evolve in lineup after the band's formation.

According to Will Mallett, the sound of the group was influenced by some of his own musical inspirations such as Gordon Lightfoot and Bob Dylan, while also drawing from the influences of the other band members Brian Higgins and Wally Wenzel, who were in a heavy metal band and "hung out around punk rock clubs" respectively.

The two brothers are the lead vocalists and writers of the band.

Over the years, the group has performed with many notable folk, country, and rock artists, such as Lynyrd Skynyrd, The Charlie Daniels Band, and 38 Special.

== Members ==
Current members

- Will Mallett – guitar, vocals (2009–present)
- Luke Mallett – guitar, vocals (2009–present)
- Nick Leen – bass (2009–present)
- Brian Higgins – drums (2009–present)
- Andrew Martelle – fiddle, mandolin, guitar, vocals (2009–present)

Former members

- Nate Soule – guitar (2009–2014)
- Matt Mills – guitar (2015)
- Wally Wenzel – dobro, guitar (2009–?)

== Discography ==
=== Studio albums ===
- The Mallet Brothers Band (2010)
- Low Down (2011)
- Land (2013)
- Lights Along The River (2015)
- The Falling Of The Pine (Songs From The Maine Woods) (2017)
- Vive L'Acadie! (2018)
- Gold Light (2021)
- Higher Up In The Hills (2025)

=== Live albums ===
- Live In Portland Maine (2019)
- Live From The State Theatre (2020)
- Harvest Dance (Live) (2025)
