= David Mallett =

American singer-songwriter (1951–2024)

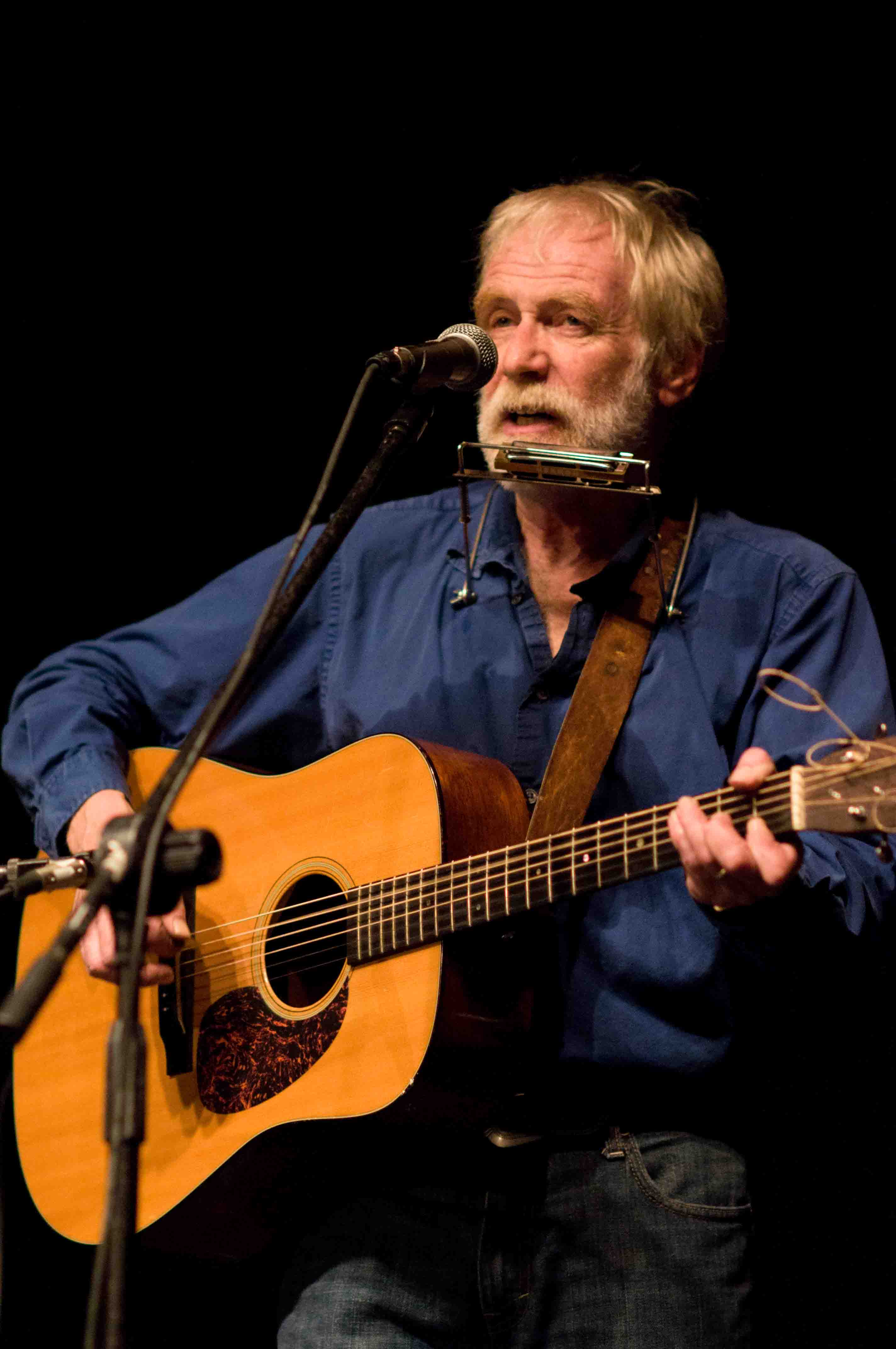
- Mallett performing in 2011

Background information
- Born: April 21, 1951; Sebec, Maine, U.S.
- Died: December 17, 2024 (aged 73)
- Genre: American folk
- Occupation: Singer-songwriter
- Instruments: Guitar; harmonica
- Years active: 1961–2024
- Labels: New World Media; Vanguard; Flying Fish; North Road
- Formerly of: The Mallett Brothers Band
- Website: http://www.davidmallett.com/

David Mallett (April 21, 1951 – December 17, 2024) was an American singer-songwriter best known for his authorship of the "folk standard" composition "Garden Song". He recorded for independent record labels for most of his career.

== Biography ==
A resident of Maine for most of his life, in the 1980s Mallett relocated to Nashville, and released two albums with the folk and blues label Vanguard. He later moved back to Maine and established his own label, North Road Records.

Mallett's songs have been recorded by more than 150 artists, including Pete Seeger; Alison Krauss; John Denver; Arlo Guthrie; Emmylou Harris, Peter, Paul & Mary; Bok; Trickett, Muir; and Makem and Clancy. "Garden Song" was recorded by the Muppets.

=== "Garden Song" ===
Mallett wrote "Garden Song" when he was in his early twenties. He had been listening to the radio when he went to help his father plant the garden at his homestead in Sebec, Maine. With "music in his head and work at his hands," the first verse came while planting:

Inch by inch, row by row
Gonna make this garden grow
All it takes is a rake and hoe
And a piece of fertile ground

Mallett walked around the yard humming it. The next day, he wrote the second verse at a friend’s house. Being only the third or fourth song he'd written, Mallett regarded "Garden Song" as a gift, one that altered the course of his life. It was recorded by John Denver; Pete Seeger; Peter, Paul and Mary; and other acts. The song is likely why the University of Maine gave Mallett an honorary degree in 2014.

=== Performance ===
Mallett frequently performed with violinist Susan Ramsey and bassist Michael Burd, with sound by Tom Gordon. He recorded 17 albums, including The Fable True in 2007, based on Henry David Thoreau's last expedition in 1857 and Alright Now, a collection of songs including "Beautiful", dedicated to his daughter Molly.

He performed in town halls and folk clubs across America and Europe in addition to major venues such as Barns of Wolf Trap, the Newport Folk Festival, and Prairie Home Companion. The Bangor Daily News recognized him as one of the 58 most memorable Mainers of the 20th Century. The readers of Folkwax voted him "2003 Artist of the Year" and his album Artist in Me as "2003 Album of the Year".

=== Death ===
Mallett died from cancer on December 17, 2024, at the age of 73.

== Legacy ==
His sons, Will and Luke, perform as The Mallett Brothers Band. The Mallett Brothers Band released the album, Live in Portland, Maine, in March 2019.

Mallett inspired many other Maine musicians and artists. Singer-songwriter Anni Clark said "He paved the way for many of us here in this little state of Maine. He gave us hope and told us that we could make a difference if we wrote and shared our words in music,” and that he encouraged people “to slow down … to see, hear, taste, embrace & share the simple & good things in life.”

== Discography ==
David Mallett released 17 albums:

1978: David Mallett
- Fire
- We Were One
- Inches and Miles
- Circle of Friends
- Arowsic
- Garden Song
- Dulcimer
- It's Cold Tonite
- I Knew This Place
- I Wish I Were a Horse
- Arthur
1979: Pennsylvania Sunrise
- The Last Time I Saw Annie
- Pennsylvania Sunrise
- Moon Upon The Left
- Haying Song
- Midnite On The Water
- Oranges And Roses
- Phil Brown
- Fast Gun Gettin' Slow
- The Candle And The Cape
- Ballad Of The Saint Anne's Reel
1981: Hard Light
- Hard Time Love Song
- Mr. Arthur's Place
- Sweet Bird Of Youth
- Highways
- The Hard Light
- On The Road From Boston
- Time And Tide
- All Dressed Up And Lonely
- Country Disco
- North To Alaska
- After All These Years
- You Say That The Battle Is Over
1983: Open Doors and Windows
- Closer Now Than Ever
- Open Doors And Windows
- Snowbound
- Thanks To Mother Mercy
- This Little Town
- I've Been Around
- Photographs and Memories
- The Longest Night
- Milly, There's A Dance In Town
- Northern Lights

1986: Vital Signs
1988: For a Lifetime
1993: This Town

1995: In the Falling Dark
- Hungry for Love
- Off the Ground
- Closer to Truth
- Like This
- That Was the One
- Way Out West
- When the Sun Comes Up
- Here We Go
- Daddy's Oldsmobile
- Come Out of the Blue
- Hope For One and All
1997: Parallel Lives
- I Hate to See this Town Go Down
- Summer of my Dreams
- Closer to Truth
- I Picture You
- You Say the Battle Is Over
- Introduction to 'Phil Brown'
- Phil Brown
- Snowbound
- Garden Song
- After the Fall
- Like This
- Daddy's Oldsmobile
- Fifty Years (Introduction To 'My Old Man')
- My Old Man
- Nothin' But a Long Goodbye
- Parallel Lives

1999: Ambition
2003: Artist in Me

2006: Midnight on the Water
- Angel Stand-in’ By
- Here We Go
- Greenin’ Up
- Dulcimer
- Walkin’
- Somewhere in Time
- Midnight on the Water
- Artist in Me
- I Knew this Place
- Didn’t Nobody Teach You
- Summer of My Dreams
- Strange Life
- Hometown Heroes
- Parallel Lives
- Fire
- A Long Goodbye
- Ballad of the St. Anne’s Reel
2007: The Fable True − Stories from Thoreau's the Maine Woods
- The 31st Of August
- Old Town
- Salmon River
- The Road To Molunkus
- Fishing
- There Were Six Of Us
- One Way River
- Rapids
2009: Alright Now
- Ten Men
- One of Those Things
- North Meets South
- Easier Than This
- Beautiful
- Innocent Time
- End of the Day
- Dark Side of the Moon
- Don't Ask Me
- Alright Now
2012: Greenin' Up
- I Knew This Place
- Greenin' Up
- Fat of the Land
- Aurora Borealis
- Dogs & Horses
- Summer of My Dreams
- Arrowsic
- Garden Song
- Good Times
- April
- The Haying Song
- Beautiful Rose
2015: The Horse I Rode In On
- Girl from the North Country
- They Covered Up the Old Swimmin' Hole
- Long Black Veil
- Wayward Wind
- Second Cup of Coffee
- How to Handle a Woman
- One More Time
- Jamaica Farewell
- Sea of Heartbreak
- Saginaw Michigan
- For the Good Times
- Tombstone Every Mile
2016: Celebration
- Celebration
- Better Than That
- Girl With The Golden Hair
- Survivor
- Ring For You
- Last Farmer's Ball
- Two Sides To Every Story
- Hard To Live These Country Songs
- You Deserve The Best
- Whatever Gets You By
