= A Little Bit of Irish =

Soundtrack album by Bing Crosby
- Released: March 12, 1996
- Recorded: September 1966
- Genre: Vocal
- Label: Golden Olden Recordings (GORCD101)
- Producer: George O'Reilly

Bing Crosby chronology
Seasons (1977)	A Little Bit of Irish (1996)	On the Sentimental Side (posthumous edition, recorded in 1962) (2010)

A Little Bit of Irish is the soundtrack album of music from the 1966 TV special of the same name starring Bing Crosby, which aired on television in the US and the UK on Saint Patrick's Day 1967. The CD was originally issued by Atlantic Records and an expanded version was issued by Golden Olden Records, both in 1993. Songs by the Irish-born composer Victor Herbert were added to the expanded CD, as was a segment featuring Irish tenor John McCormack together with other Irish-themed songs by Crosby from his various radio series.

== Background ==
During personal discussions over several years which culminated in early 1966, Bing Crosby agreed to work with Irish entrepreneur George O'Reilly in the making of a television show in Ireland featuring Irish artists, music, and songs. The recording of this hour-long show was scheduled for a week in September 1966 and four locations were chosen for the outside filming. The show opened with Crosby standing on a small platform at O'Connell Bridge overlooking O'Connell Street in Dublin, then moving to the grounds and interior of Howth Castle at Deerpark in County Dublin. The second main segment was filmed on the stage of the world-famous Abbey Theatre in Dublin with The Little Dublin Singers, and the final segment was filmed amongst the keeves and vats at the Guinness Brewery in James's Street, Dublin with the Guinness Choir.

The orchestra was the Radio Éireann Light Orchestra conducted by co-director Buddy Bregman, and they recorded the music in the O'Connell Hall, Dublin. Bing added his voice at the Eamonn Andrews Studios in Henry Street and also contributed some items live on location during the actual filming. He also scripted the programme himself and featured his wife Kathryn in the Howth Castle and Abbey Theatre segments.

== Critical reception ==
Variety reviewed the TV special, saying: "Hosted by Bing Crosby at his most nonchalant, this pleasing songalog was presented as an affectionate tribute to Ireland, using local talent to give samples from its musical backlog ... Crosby himself strolled effortlessly though such numbers as "Dublin Bay" [sic], "Molly Malone", "Come Back to Erin", and other folk standards, and wife Kathryn occasionally acted as hostess with suitable charm ... Crosby wandered through the Guinness factory and other venues, like a kindly guide and dodged most of the pitfalls of sentimentality inherent in the subject. With the U. S. bulging with Irishmen, and with the Kennedy connection still to the fore, the show should foster nostalgia and mild pleasure in that particular mart."

== Track listing ==
Songs from the TV show, all performed by Bing Crosby except where marked.

No.	Title	Writer(s)	Artists	Length
1.	"Molly Malone"	Traditional		2:08
2.	"Come Back to Erin"	Charlotte Alington Barnard		2:20
3.	"Galway Bay"	Arthur Colahan		2:40
4.	"Molly Malone (reprise)"	Traditional		0:56
5.	"Isle of Innisfree"	Dick Farrelly		2:03
6.	"Believe Me, If All Those Endearing Young Charms"	Traditional, Thomas Moore	Guinness Choir only	1:29
7.	"The Boys of Wexford"	Arthur Warren Darley, Patrick Joseph McCall	Guinness Choir only	2:21
8.	"McNamara's Band"	Shamus O'Connor, John J. Stamford	Bing Crosby, Milo O'Shea and Dermot O'Brien	2:31
9.	"When Irish Eyes Are Smiling"	Ernest Ball, Chauncey Olcott, George Graff Jr.		2:18

The Victor Herbert Compositions, all commercial recordings for Decca Records except track 16. All performed by Bing Crosby except where marked.

No.	Title	Writer(s)	Artists	Length
10.	"When You're Away"	Victor Herbert, Henry Blossom		2:59
11.	"Ah! Sweet Mystery of Life"	Victor Herbert, Rida Johnson Young		2:48
12.	"Sweethearts"	Victor Herbert, Harry B. Smith		3.12
13.	"Thine Alone"	Victor Herbert, Henry Blossom		2:58
14.	"Gypsy Love Song"	Victor Herbert, Harry B. Smith	Bing Crosby, Frances Langford	3:02
15.	"I'm Falling in Love with Someone"	Victor Herbert, Rida Johnson Young	Bing Crosby, Frances Langford	3:08
16.	"Indian Summer"	Victor Herbert, Al Dubin	Bing Crosby, Dorothy Kirsten	2:35

Songs from various radio shows, all performed by Bing Crosby.

No.	Title	Writer(s)	Length
17.	"The Donovans"	Alicia Adélaide Needham, Walter Kent, Francis Fahy	2:23
18.	"St. Patrick's Day Parade"	Johnny Lange, Hy Heath	2:22
19.	"Top o' the Morning"	Jimmy Van Heusen, Johnny Burke	1:37
20.	"That Tumbledown Shack in Athlone"	Monte Carlo, Alma Sanders, Richard W. Pascoe	3:08
21.	"Dear Old Donegal"	Steve Graham	2:35
22.	"Too Ra Loo Ra Loo Ral"	James Royce Shannon	3:57
23.	"How Are Things in Glocca Morra?"	Burton Lane, E. Y. Harburg	3:27

The Bing Crosby / John McCormack Segment - Kraft Music Hall, May 13, 1937

No.	Title	Writer(s)	Artists	Length
24.	"Dialogue"		Bing Crosby, John McCormack, Lionel Stander	5:17
25.	"So Do I Love You"	R. Veasey, Haydn Wood	John McCormack	2:03
26.	"Dialogue"		Bing Crosby, John McCormack, Edwin Schneider	0:38
27.	"Shannon River"	Kathleen Egan, Reginald Morgan	John McCormack	2:16
28.	"Dialogue"		Bing Crosby	0:11
