= Thomas Keenan =

Thomas Keenan may refer to:

- Tommy Keenan, Irish basketball player
- Thomas P. Keenan (1866–1927), Irish songwriter
