= Cloghamon Mill =

1815 Irish song

Cloghamon Mill is a song dating from around 1815 in County Wexford, Ireland. It describes a mill built at Clohamon near Newtownbarry (now Bunclody).

The mill was said to be on the River Slaney, about a mile below Bunclody. A cotton mill is known to have been built at Clohamon here from around 1835, along with later a woollen mill. The song may refer these, or the extensive water mills thought to have existed in the area prior to the establishment of the 1835 mill. Mills were prominent in the area at the time, as the local population was mainly employed in mills in the 1830s.

The below verses are said to part, but not all of the song. The absent verses are said to be about:

"the attention of the neighbouring gentry to the wants of the poor; and the poet, relaxing the strain, kept up to this point on his imagination, makes a rather commonplace conclusion to his ode, which we are obliged to omit, having, as we trust, supplied sufficient data to determine the measure of our bard's genius".

== Lyrics ==
The recorded song with arrangement by traditional singer Paddy Berry feature the below lyrics.

You gods of brilliant genius that's endowed with elocution
And by versification have immortalized your name
Revive my drooping intellect, I crave a contribution
Of assistance while I harmonize with eloquence my theme
Forgive me not for rashness to attempt impossibilities
Though I am stimulated by a motive of goodwill
Though an inexperienced tyro in the dawn of native literature
I intend to state the praises of Cloghamon's brand new mill.

This magnificent structure of divine architecture
We built in anno domini eighteen and sixteen
When by final perseverance it was brought to an accomplishment
Its like was seldom ever seen in Erin the green
To give a good idea about its spaciousness and symmetry
Is far beyond the limits of my feeble poet's pen
But in every direction tis a bulwark of perfection
Hibernia's boast and glory is Cloghamon's brand new mill.

No wonder I should deem it an object of astonishment,
When men of great discernment came from near and far
To view this lofty building, of which it is related
That it was prognosticated by a great fiery star
These grand configurations, the beauty of creation,
Was brought to calculation by astronomical skill
Twas perspicuously expounded and foretold there would be founded
Near the town of Newtonberry an admirable mill.

Now the gentry of this country, for rural recreation,
The sweet meandering banks of the Slaney do serenade
Where the beauties of nature are arranged in true reality
And the white trout is abounding in each crystal cascade
When on this lofty building you feast your curiosity
And view each grand invention of artifice and skill
The critical machinery and curious elevation
Obtained great approbation for Cloghamon's brand new mill.

The first recorded lyrics (below) were published in 1863. The same were lyrics were recorded by folklorist Patrick Kennedy, which he heard in The Duffrey, County Wexford before publishing them in 1869.

You lads of brilliant genius that's endowed with elocution
And by versification have immortalized your name
To revive my drooping intellect, I crave a contribution
Of assistance for to harmonize with eloquence my theme
Condemn me not for rashness to attempt impossibilities
As I am stimulated by a motive of good will;
Though an inexperienced tyro in the dawn of native literature,
I intend to state the praises of Cloghamon New Mill.

This magnificent structure of sublime architecture
Was founded in Anno Domini eighteen hundred and fifteen,
When by final perseverance it was brought to an accomplishment
Its parallel could not be found in Erin the Green.
To give a perfect idea of its spaciousness and symmetry,
Is far beyond the limits of a feeble poet's skill,
In every direction 'tis a bulwark of perfection;
Hibernia's boast and glory is Cloghamon New Mill.

No wonder I should deem it an object of astonishment,
When men of great discernment arrived from afar
To view this lofty building, of which it is related
That it was prognosticated by a great fiery star.
These grand conflagrations - the wonder of creation,
Were brought to calculation by astronomical skill;
'Twas perspicuously expounded, and foretold there would be founded
Near the town of Newtonberry, this admirable mill.

Now the gentry of this country, for rural recreation,
The sweet meandering banks of the Slaney do surnade,
Where the paintings of Nature are arranged in true reality –
The white trout abounding in each crystal cascade
When on the noble building they feasted their curiosity
And viewed each grand invention of artifice and skill,
The critical machinery and curious elevation
Obtained great approbation for Cloghamon New Mill.

== See also ==
- Traditional Irish Singers
- Roud Folk Song Index
