= Johnny Jump Up (song) =

Irish drinking song

Song by Tadhg Jordan

"Johnny Jump Up" is an Irish drinking song by Tadhg Jordan from County Cork. It was first popularized by Jimmy Crowley, and then brought to a wider audience by Christy Moore, appearing on his self-titled 1976 album Christy Moore.

Johnny Jump Up is a strong cider, apparently made stronger by being stored in old whiskey barrels. The song contains numerous local Cork references such as "Up The Lee Road," where a psychiatric hospital was located.
