= Nicholas Colahan =

Irish physician

Nicholas Colohan
- Born: 1806; Ballinasloe, County Galway, Ireland
- Died: February 11, 1890
- Education: University of Edinburgh (M.D., 1828)
- Occupations: Doctor, Professor of Medicine
- Years active: 1849–1879
- Employer(s): Queen's University, Galway
- Known for: Professor of Medicine at Queen's University, Galway
- Spouse: Sara Whistler
- Children: John, Frances, William, Nicholas (father of Arthur Colohan)
- Relatives: William Colohan, James Colohan (doctors of Ballinasloe)

Nicholas Colohan (1806 – 11 February 1890) was an Irish doctor and professor of medicine at Queen's University, Galway from 1849 to 1879.

Colohan was a native of Ballinasloe and related to William and James Colohan, highly respected doctors who practised in that town.

He graduated with a medical degree from the University of Edinburgh in 1828, though without a surgical qualification. Colohan was one of six doctors associated with Galway's Fever Hospital.

He married Sara, daughter of Dr. Thomas Whistler of Oranmore. Their children included: John Colohan, Frances, William and Nicholas, who was the father of Arthur Colohan (1884–1952).
