= Jimmy Murphy (song) =

Jimmy Murphy also known as 'Little Jimmy Murphy' is a song, possibly of music-hall origin, referencing the 1798 rebellion, which occurred largely in Wexford.

According to research by Roly Brown:

'There are three versions; from Jack Barnard and a Mr J Thomas, both noted by Cecil Sharp; and a version sent to Sharp which was supplied by a Dr John Taylor who recorded it from 'a soldier'.

Each version is quite different, some not referencing the rebellion at all, but all versions sharing the distinctive Irish lilting refrain and a final verse stating that Jimmy Murphy was hung for courting ladies as opposed to sheep stealing.

According to Frank Harte '...it has been suggested to me that the reference in the last verse to Kate Whelan:

Now Jimmy Murphy was hanged not for sheep stealing
But for courting a pretty girl and her name was Kate Whelan

could be interpreted as a reference to Ireland as Cathleen ni Houlihan.'

'When I first heard this song, sung by Sean Óg O'Thuama many years ago, it had only three verses and that most peculiar chorus. A friend of mine, Luke Cheevers, in true traditional fashion wrote several verses, which I believe enhance the song, and expand the story.'Frank Harte

== Recordings ==
- Frank Harte on the album And Listen To My Song
- The Voice Squad on the album 'Hollywood'
- Niall Wall on the albums '1798 Songs of Wexford', 1998, and with the group Whisht on the album 'The Cuckoo's Note'
- The High Kings on their DVD, The High Kings: Live In Dublin
- Fionnuala Mac Lochlain on an unusual 1798 song at the RTÉ Dublin studio in August 1975
- The Wolfe Tones on the album 'Profile'

== See also ==
- List of Irish ballads
