= Tirconaill Tribune =

Newspaper in County Donegal, Ireland

- Type: Weekly newspaper
- Format: Tabloid
- Editor: John McAteer
- Founded: 1991
- Headquarters: Letterkenny, County Donegal

Front page of the Tirconaill Tribune

The Tirconaill Tribune is an Irish weekly newspaper. Its editor is John McAteer. The newspaper's headquarters is in Milford, County Donegal. It is distributed to shops across north County Donegal.

The Tirconaill Tribune is printed on Wednesday evenings. It circulates each Thursday.

== History ==
First printed in 1991, by October 2022 it had gone through about 1,600 issues.

Lawrence Donegan's book No News at Throat Lake (Penguin: 2000) is a memoir about his year-long stay in Creeslough from late 1998, playing for the local Gaelic football club and working at the Tirconaill Tribune. The book also chronicles the "eccentric ways" of editor John McAteer.

In 2008, the Tribune published the Government's decision to end disability allowances for teenagers between the age of 16 and 18. The paper reported that Tánaiste Mary Coughlan had met with concerned constituents and that the Down Syndrome Association had received confirmation of the change. Fine Gael TD Joe McHugh brought a copy of the newspaper to Leinster House to inform his leader Enda Kenny.

In October 2022, editor John McAteer described the edition of the Tirconaill Tribune published after the Creeslough explosion as "probably the most important" ever.
