= Francis Fahy (songwriter) =

Irish songwriter (1854–1935)

- Born: Francis Arthur Fahy; 29 September 1854; Kinvara, County Galway, Ireland
- Died: 1935 (aged 80–81)
- Occupations: Songwriter, poet

Francis Arthur Fahy (29 September 1854 – 1935) was an Irish nationalist, songwriter and poet. He is probably best remembered as the composer of the evergreen "The Ould Plaid Shawl". He collaborated with various composers, including Alicia Adélaide Needham, an associate of the Royal Academy of Music.

== Life ==
Fahy was born at Kinvara, County Galway, the son of Thomas Fahy, who came from the Burren area, and Celia Marlborough from Gort.

== Songs ==
Songs composed by Fahy include the following:

- "The Ould Plaid Shawl"
- "The Queen of Connemara"
- "I Gaily Gave My Heart Away"
- "My Hearts Treasure"
- "The Tide Full In"
- "Galway Bay"
- "Summer is Coming"
- "The Bog Road"
- "Rebel Heart"
- "The Donovans
- "Little Mary Cassidy"

== See also ==
- List of Irish ballads
- Music of Ireland
- Irish Texts Society
