= John Colahan =

Irish-born British Army general

John Joseph Aloysius Colahan (30 March 1836 – 19 November 1918) was Surgeon Major General in the British Army.

== Family ==
The eldest of the four children of Professor Nicholas Colahan (1806–1890), and his first wife, Sarah Colahan (1814–49), née Whistler, John Joseph Aloysius Colahan was born in Galway, Ireland on 30 March 1836. His three siblings were Mary Josephine Colahan (1843–1912), Francis Colahan (1843–), and William Henry Colahan (1848–).

He married Eliza McDowell Orr (1859–1899), a concert pianist, in Malta, in 1885. They had six children: Mary Margarita Colahan (1886–1965); Beatrice Clare Colahan (1889–1984); Frederick John Orr Colahan (1892–1982); John Maurice Orr "Jack" Colahan (1894–1917); the artist Colin Cuthbert Orr Colahan (1897–1987); and Basil Nicholas Orr Colahan (1898–1980).

== Medical career ==
Colahan graduated M.D. at Queen's University, Galway in 1857, and served as an army surgeon in India, Gibraltar and Malta. He served as Principal Medical Officer in Ireland. The family moved from Dublin to Cape Town in 1889, then to Victoria, Australia, in 1896.

Colahan died in the Melbourne seaside suburb of St Kilda on 19 November 1918.
