= The Finding of Moses (poem) =

Poem by Zozimus (Michael J. Moran)

"The Finding of Moses" is a poem by the Irish street poet Zozimus (b. circa 1794 – d. 3 April 1846). It describes, in broad Dublin dialect, the Finding of Moses, an event in the early life of Moses recorded in the Old Testament.

== Text ==
In Agypt's land contaygious to the Nile,
Old Pharao's daughter went to bathe in style,
She tuk her dip and came unto the land,
And for to dry her royal pelt she ran along the strand:
A bull-rush tripped her, whereupon she saw
A smiling babby in a wad of straw,
She took it up and said in accents mild,
"Tare-an-ages, girls, which o'yees own the child?"
