= Johnny Patterson =

Irish singer and songwriter (1840–1889)

John Francis Patterson (1840–1889) was an Irish singer, songwriter and circus entertainer. He is now best known for composing the song "The Garden Where the Praties Grow".

== Early life ==
He was born in Kilbarron, Feakle, County Clare. Both his parents had died by the time he was three years old and so he was raised by an uncle in Ennis. At the age of 14 he enlisted in the 63rd Regiment of Foot which was based in Limerick at the time. He learned to play various instruments especially piccolo and drums. When a circus came to Limerick he got a part-time job in its band and so bought himself out of the army.

== Circus career ==
He was soon given a long-term contract by the circus and billed as The Irish Singing Clown. He worked for other circuses in Ireland before crossing to England. Between 1865 and 1867, he was a drummer performing in a circus run by Pablo Fanque, the black English circus proprietor, and John Swallows. He remained with Fanque through 1869, performing in Scotland, Ireland, and England. It was Fanque who effectively launched his career. John Nee, an Irish actor who portrayed Patterson in a 2010 stage production about his life said:

His talent for singing, clowning, and engaging with an audience was immense. He was talent-spotted by Pablo Fanque, who The Beatles sing about in 'Mr Kite' – he was a famous black Yorkshire showman. He saw Johnny in Cork, loved him, and brought him to England.

In Liverpool he met and married a circus bareback rider, Selena Hickey. Around this time he composed the song "The Garden Where the Praties Grow".

== United States and after ==
His fame grew until he was offered a contract in America in 1876 separating from his wife and family. In the United States he became one of the most famous and highest paid entertainers at the time. He composed several more songs including "The Hat my Father Wore", "Bridget Donoghue", "Shake Hands with your Uncle Dan", "Goodbye Johnny Dear" and "The Stone outside Dan Murphy's Door". Aged 45, he was a wealthy man and so returned to Ireland buying a house in Belfast where he was reunited with his wife and family, but Hickey died in 1886. He continued performing and created a circus of his own with an Australian called Joe Keeley. In April 1888 he married Bridget Murray at Castlepollard, County Westmeath.

== Death and legacy ==
His political opinions expressed in a song (he wanted Protestants and Catholics to live together peacefully) caused a fight at one performance. Patterson was hit on the head by an iron bar and was kicked. He died from his injuries at Tralee on 31 May 1889 at the age of 49. (Note his death certificate states he died from pneumonia after 9 days)

Johnny Patterson's songs have been recorded by numerous artists over the years, including his great-grandson Duncan Patterson, and several plays have been produced about his life. He was a character in Stewart Parker's play Heavenly Bodies along with the figure of Dion Boucicault representing two different sides of the Irish theatre. The Barabbas Theatre Company produced Johnny Patterson: The Singing Irish Clown in 2010 and Johnny Patterson the Musical was written about his life and relationship with Bridget Donoghue by Declan Mangan and Mick Jones in 2009. Johnny Patterson also had the honour of being painted by the famous Irish artist Jack Yeats in the 1928 painting The Singing Clown.

In 1985 a local committee, chaired by Sean Seosamh O Conchubhair (Tralee), erected a memorial in Tralee's New Cemetery to commemorate his interment there. The plaque was unveiled by Dick Spring and Johnny Patterson's granddaughter, Maura (nee Patterson) McArdle.
