= Neil McBride (poet) =

Irish poet, author, and songwriter (1861–1942)

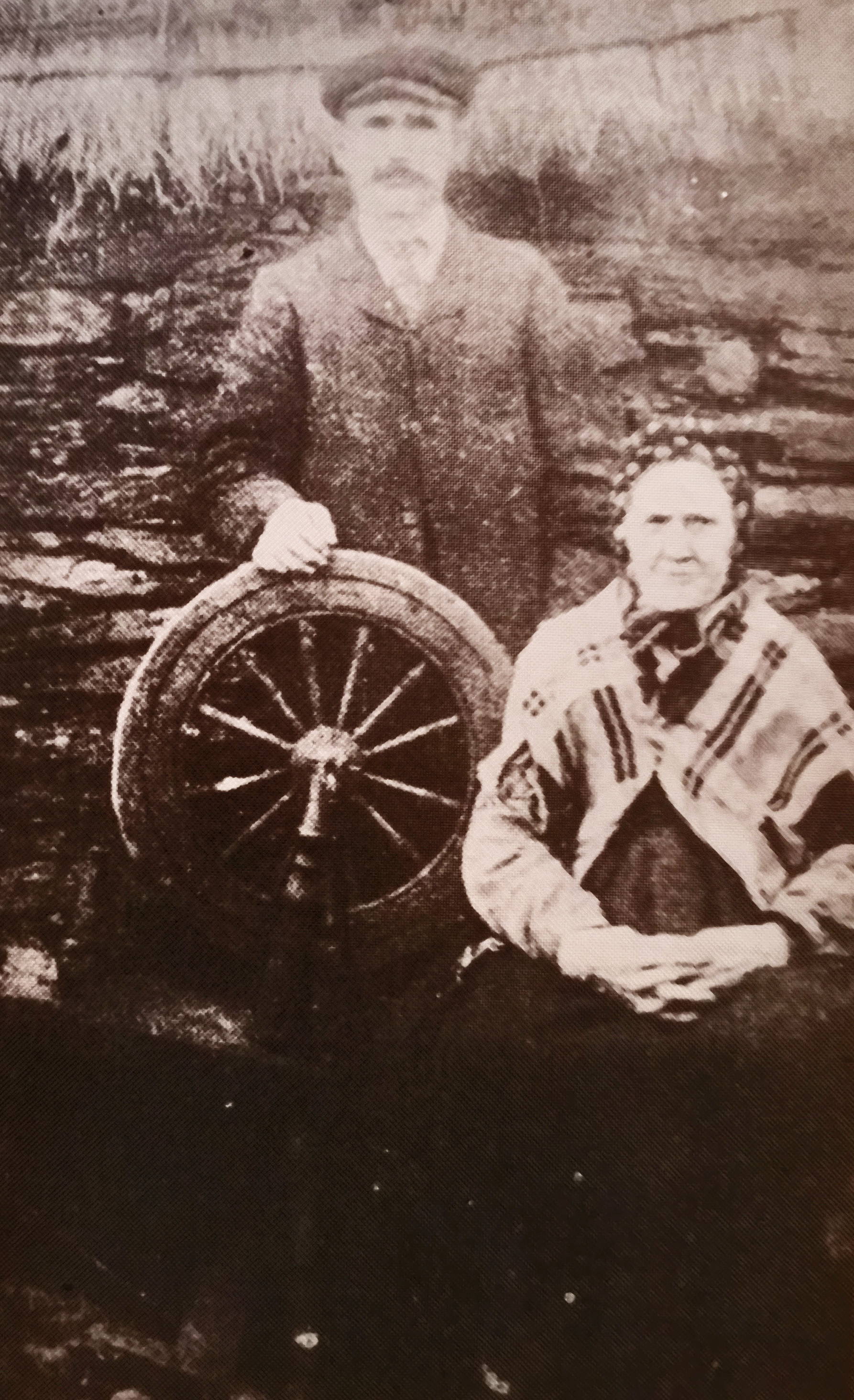
Neil McBride (Niall Mac Giolla Bhríde) at his home in 1900.

Neil McBride (Irish: Niall Mac Giolla Bhrighde; 1861–1942) was a farmer, poet, author, and songwriter from Feymore, Creeslough, Donegal, Ireland, who further gained notoriety for protesting a fine he received for having his name written in Irish on his business cart.

== Farmer and poet ==
Neil McBride spent his entire life in the small village of Feymore, Creeslough, He lived on Crockatee (Cruckathee), a foothill of Muckish Mountain and earned his living as a cottier (farmer) and a poet. Neil published a book of poems in 1905 called Blaṫa Fraoiċ ('Heather Blossoms'). McBride's poems and songs became well known throughout Ireland. Some titles include: "The Hills of Donegal", "Noreen Bawn" (1910), "The Castle of Doe", "Marble Hill" and "Mo Chró Beag ag Bun Chnoc a' Tighe" ("My wee shack below Crockatee")

== Historic encounter with the law ==
McBride was a farmer by trade and all business carts were required to display its owner's name in English. On the evening of 11 March 1905, returning home from the Dunfanaghy Fair, in a nearby town, McBride was stopped and questioned by an English 'bobby' who fined him one shilling for having 'illegible' (Irish) writing on his donkey cart. The sign defiantly read, "N. MAC GIOLLA ḂRIĠDE FIOḊ-MÓR" in Irish. It was made by McBride's friend and fellow poet, Andrew Mac Intyre. McBride refused to pay the fine and defended himself at the Dunfanaghy Petty Session. He lost, and was penalized an additional shilling after still refusing to pay.

The Conradh na Gaeilge ("Gaelic League") learned of McBride's story and made efforts to help him. One of its members, attorney Patrick Pearse, seeing the opportunity to champion Irish independence, agreed to defend McBride, pro bono. McBride's appeal was brought before the Court of King's Bench in Dublin. It was Pearse's first and only court appearance as a barrister. The case was lost, but it inspired Pearse in his endeavors as a political activist and spawned a national campaign to change British government policies towards the Irish language. Pearse wrote about the court's decision in his 27 June 1905 column in the Gaelic League newspaper, An Claidheamh Soluis: "...it was in effect decided that Irish is a foreign language on the same level with Yiddish." Continuing in the article, he urges the people of Ireland to promote the Irish Language as a form of Irish nationalism.

== Legacy ==
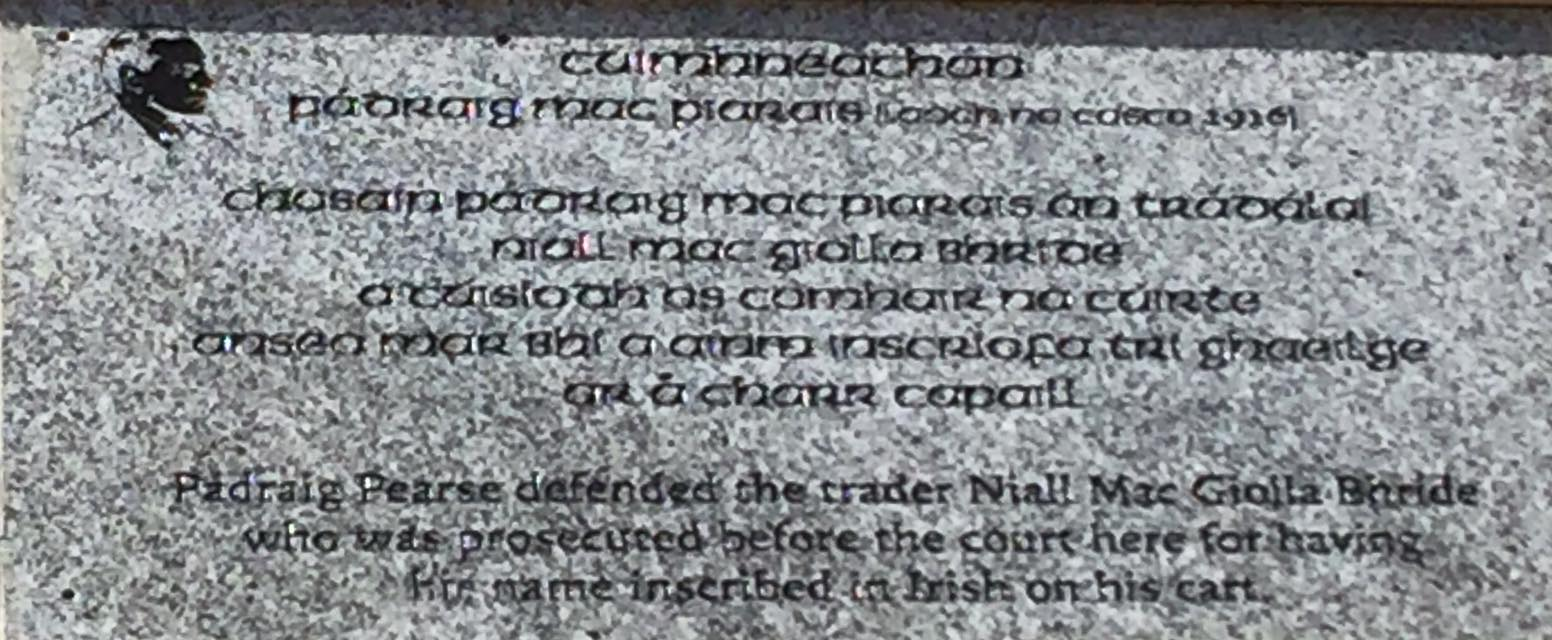
Engraved granite plaque located at Dunfanaghy Market Square in tribute to Neil McBride and Patrick Pearse, written in both Irish and English. (Photo by Pearse Doherty)

=== Literature ===
- Creeslough historian and author, Seamus Harkin featured McBride's poetry and songs in his 1996 book, ‘Poets and People of Doe’
- McBride published a collection of his songs and poems in 1905 in a book called 'Blaṫa Fraoiċ’ (‘Heather Blossoms’) Songs in Irish and English by Niall Mac Giolla Bhrighde.
- In 2011, Seamus Harkin updated and reissued 'Blaṫa Fraoiċ’ , adding two extra songs, which McBride had composed after the original book was published. At the book's unveiling Seamus stated, "My reason for printing this book is to let people, especially the young, know the great wealth of talent we had in the parish.”
- Liam Ó Connacháin wrote a biography about Neil in 1939 titled, "Dírbheathaisnéis Néill Mhic Ghiolla Bhrighde". It was reprinted in 1974.

=== Music, Radio, Television ===
- A radio broadcast about Neil's life and works aired on Radio Éireann in 1936.
- A folk song, inspired by Neil's cart story, called "An Trucailín Donn" ("The Little Brown Cart"), was collected by Mícheál Ó hEidhin in the 1975 Irish language songbook "Cas Amhrán", and was released on 29 September 2012 by the band, Réalta on the album "Open the Door for Three".
- In January, 2016, "An Trucailín Donn", a documentary about McBride and his cart, aired on the Irish Gaelic language television channel TG4.

=== Memorials ===
- The name plate from McBride's cart is on permanent display at the Donegal County Museum in Letterkenny.
- A plaque honoring McBride was placed at the entrance to Doe (Chapel) Cemetery, and dedicated by Liam Connachain at its unveiling on 3 October 1982.
- On 18 April 2016, a commemorative plaque was unveiled by Pearse Doherty at Dunfanaghy Market Square in memory of the infamous court case, involving Patrick Pearse.
