= Jimmy Crowley =

Irish folk musician and song collector

- 16 March 2014, at the Everyman Palace Theatre

Background information
- Born: 1950 (age 75–76); Douglas, County Cork, Ireland
- Genres: Irish traditional music, Celtic, folk
- Occupations: Musician, songwriter
- Instruments: Vocals, guitar, bouzouki
- Years active: 1970–present
- Formerly of: Stoker's Lodge
- Website: jimmycrowley.com music.apple.com/us/artist/jimmy-crowley/74937666

Jimmy Crowley (born 1950) is an Irish folk musician and song collector. He has specialized in collecting and playing traditional songs from County Cork.

Crowley started collecting music at the age of 16. His recordings popularised local songs such as "Johnny Jump Up", "Salonika", "The Boys of Fairhill" and "The Armoured Car".

== Early years ==
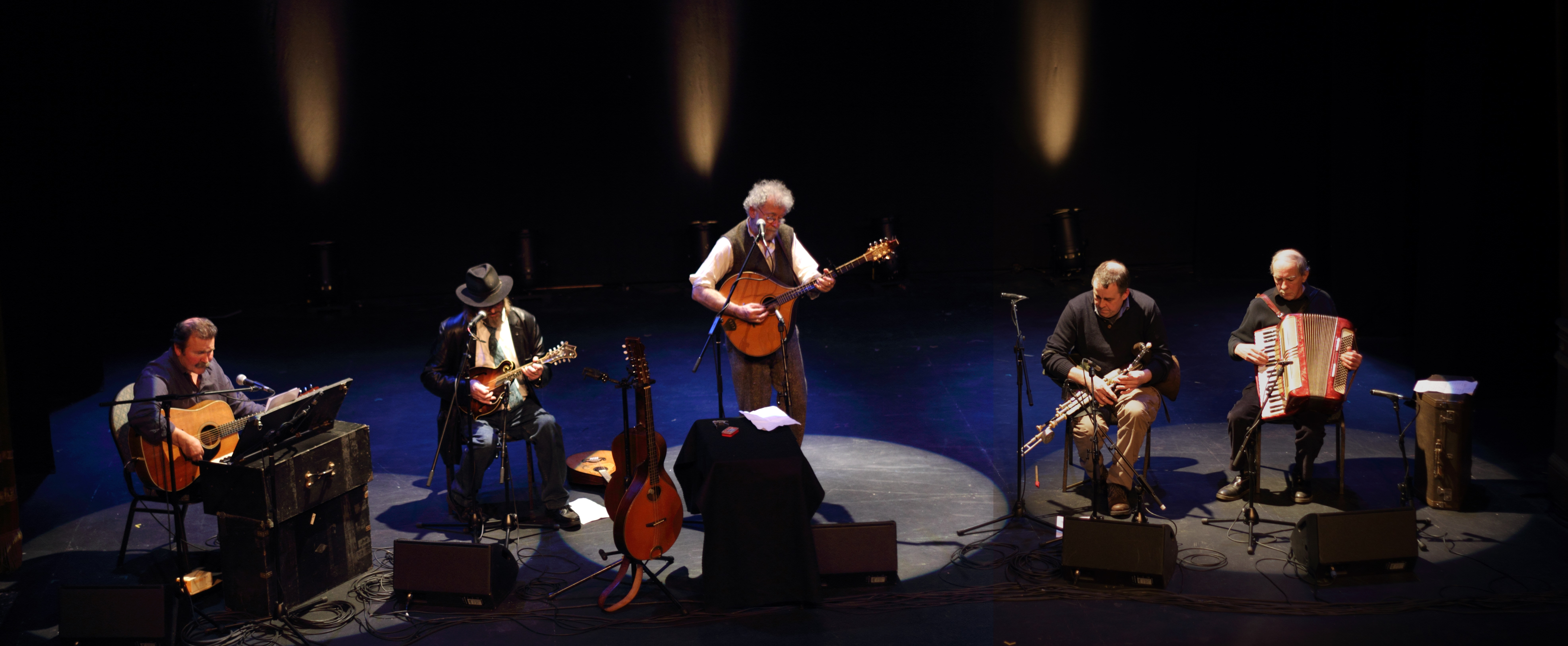
Jimmy Crowley with Stoker's Lodge

Crowley was born in Douglas, County Cork. His father was a tenor singer with a love of opera. After school he was apprenticed to a cabinet-maker. He formed Stoker's Lodge, the other members being Mick Murphy, Christy Twomey and Johnny "Fang" Murphy. Eoin Ó Riabhaigh joined some time later. The band was named after the gate lodge of the Stoker estate in Frankfield, Cork, near Crowley's boyhood home. Mícheál Ó Domhnaill of The Bothy Band was an early mentor and produced their first two albums. The band members drifted apart in the mid -80's but reformed in 2014 for one time to mark the passing of Christy Twomey the previous year.

After the demise of Stoker's Lodge, he formed The Electric Band. They released a reggae version of "The Boys of Fairhill" which went straight into the pop charts.

Crowley married Evelyn Murray in 1980. They separated in 2006.

== Later career ==
From the 1990s Crowley pursued a solo career. From December 2002 onwards he provided a weekly column for Saturday's Evening Echo about ballads and folklore. Crowley spent several years in America, from 2006 onwards, basing himself in Florida.

In 2014 Crowley published a large volume Songs From The Beautiful City: Cork Urban Ballads with musical notation and lyrics and with related anecdotes on the facing page.

In 2017 his ballad opera, Red Patriots, was staged at the Triskel Theatre, Cork. Set in the context of Mao Tse-tung's Cultural Revolution, it is the story of an apprentice musician who falls for a girl revolutionary and portrays the burning of the Marxist bookshop in Cork, an actual event from the seventies.

Crowley holds a degree from University College Cork in folklore and Irish, taken as a mature student.

== Discography ==
With Stoker's Lodge

- Boys of Fairhill (1975)
- Camphouse Ballads (1979)

Solo

- Jimmy mo Mhíle Stór (1985)
- My Love is a Tall Ship (1997)
- Uncorked! (1998)
- Sex, Sea and Sedition (1999)
- Irish Eyes

His music is available via Apple Music: https://music.apple.com/us/artist/jimmy-crowley/74937666
