= Galway Bay (song) =

Song

"Galway Bay" is the name of at least three different songs named after Galway Bay in the west of Ireland.

The first, "(My Own Dear) Galway Bay", was written in the 1920s and gained popularity through a version by Irish singer, Dolores Keane, released in 1983. The second song was written in 1947 and popularised by Bing Crosby. A third song was recorded by the Galway rock band Toasted Heretic in 1988.

== "(My Own Dear) Galway Bay" ==
This song is known alternatively as "Galway Bay", "My Own Dear Galway Bay", or "The Old Galway Bay".

The lyrics were written in London by Francis Fahy (1854–1935), a native of Kinvara, Co. Galway, on the shores of Galway Bay. It was originally written to the air of an older song, "Skibbereen", and was first recorded by Emmett O'Toole in 1927. This version was also recorded by Frank Harte and Dónal Lunny on their 2004 album The Hungry Voice: The Song Legacy of Ireland’s Great Hunger.

The song was later put to a different air by Galway singer/songwriter, Tony Small, of the band Wild Geese, and released on their 1979 album Flight 2. This version was later made famous by the singer Dolores Keane who recorded it with John Faulkner on their 1983 album Sail Óg Rua.

== "Galway Bay" ==
A separate song was written by Dr. Arthur Colahan in Leicester in 1947 and popularised by Bing Crosby. Crosby recorded the song with Victor Young and his Orchestra on 27 November 1947, and changed some of the lyrics so as to be less political, for example changing "speak a language that the English do not know" to "… that the strangers do not know". It became a huge hit around the world with Irish emigrants, and reached the No. 3 position in the Billboard charts in the U.S. Crosby recorded the song again in 1966 for a television show broadcast the following year. The tracks were recorded in Dublin, and later commercially issued on the album A Little Bit of Irish. Crosby also included the song in his 50th anniversary concert at the London Palladium, which was recorded and issued on a double album. In 1948, "Galway Bay" spent 22 consecutive weeks at No. 1 on the UK's sheet music sales chart, with multiple cover versions available at the time. Unusually, it entered the chart at No. 1, and spent a total of 39 weeks on the listings. The contemporary recordings available during this period were by:

- Denis Martin
- Robert Wilson
- Bing Crosby
- The Sentimentalists presented by Billy Cotton
- Anne Shelton with The Wardour Singers
- Bill Johnson
- Jack Simpson and his Sextet (vocal by Dave Kydd)
- Michael O'Duffy with Duncan Morrison (piano)
- Joseph McNally
- Josef Locke
- Joe Loss and his Orchestra (vocal by The Lhon D'Hoo Male Choir)
- Johnny Cash

Ruby Murray later included the song on her album When Irish Eyes Are Smiling (1955).

The copyright of "Galway Bay" is held by Box and Cox Publications of London. A humorous version was created by The Clancy Brothers and Tommy Makem. A reference to Colahan's song appears in The Pogues' "Fairytale of New York". Chloë Agnew of Celtic Woman also covered the song in the group's show Songs from the Heart.

== Toasted Heretic song ==
A third song, titled "Galway Bay", features on the debut album of Galway rock band Toasted Heretic, Songs for Swinging Celibates released in 1988. The song was re-recorded and re-released on their 1992 album Another Day, Another Riot. The original version of the song was re-released in 2005 as part of a double CD, Now in New Nostalgia Flavour. The song is unrelated to the other two songs of the same name.
