= Zozimus =

Irish street poet (c. 1794 – 1846)

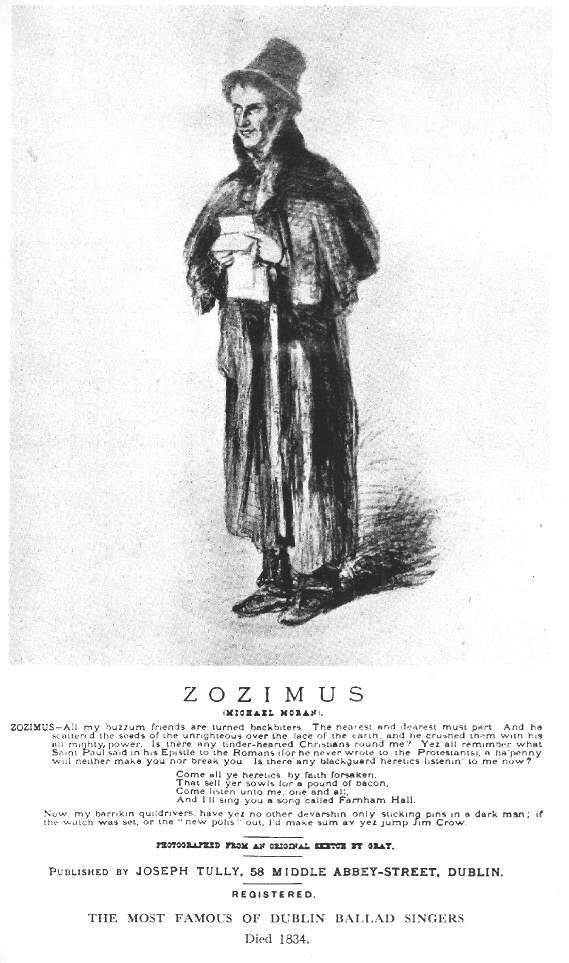

Background information
- Also known as: Zozimus
- Born: Michael J. Moran c. 1794; Dublin, Kingdom of Ireland
- Died: 3 April 1846 Dublin, Ireland
- Occupations: Street entertainer, poet

Michael J. Moran (c. 1794 – 3 April 1846), popularly known as Zozimus /ˈzɒzɪməs/, was an Irish street rhymer. He was a resident of Dublin and also known as the "Blind Bard of the Liberties" and the "Last of the Gleemen".

== Biography ==
Michael J. Moran was born about 1794 in Faddle Alley off the Blackpitts in Dublin's Liberties and lived in Dublin all his life. At two weeks old he was blinded by illness. He developed an astounding memory for verse and made his living reciting poems, many of which he had composed himself, in his own lively style. He was described by songwriter P.J. McCall as the last gleeman of the Pale.

Many of his rhymes had religious themes; others were political or recounted current events. He is said to have worn "a long, coarse, dark, frieze coat with a cape, the lower parts of the skirts being scalloped, an old soft, greasy, brown beaver hat, corduroy trousers and Francis Street brogues, and he carried a long blackthorn stick secured to his wrist with a strap."

He performed all over Dublin including at Essex Bridge, Wood Quay, Church Street, Dame Street, Capel Street, Sackville Street, Grafton Street, Henry Street, and Conciliation Hall. He began each oration with the verse:

Ye sons and daughters of Erin,
Gather round poor Zozimus, yer friend;
Listen boys, until yez hear
My charming song so dear.

In his last few years, his voice grew weak, costing him his means of livelihood. He ended up feeble and bedridden and he died on 3 April 1846 at his lodgings in 15 Patrick Street, aged around 52, and was buried in Glasnevin Cemetery two days later on Palm Sunday. He had feared grave robbers, who were busy in Dublin at the time. In one of his narrative songs, he begged his long-established companion, "Stony Pockets":

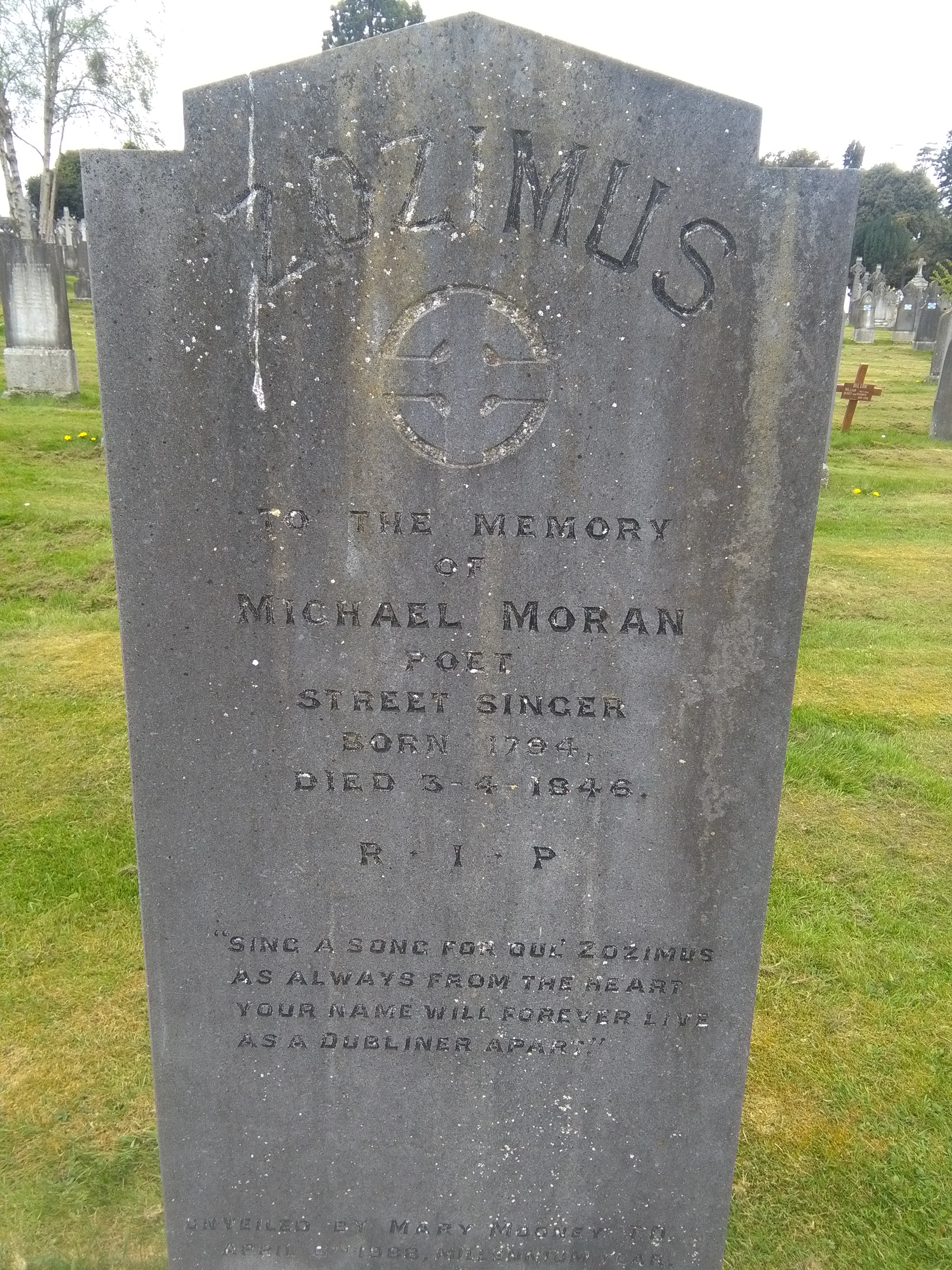
Zozimus' tombstone

Oh Stony, Stony
Don't let the Sack-'Em-Ups get me
Send round the hat
And buy me a grave.

Zozimus was buried in Glasnevin's Prospect Cemetery which was guarded day and night. His grave remained unmarked until the late 1960s, when the band The Dublin City Ramblers erected a tombstone in his memory. His grave is in the "Poor Ground" of the cemetery, at the co-ordinates AG 30 South; it is not far from Daniel O'Connell's monument.

His epitaph reads:

My burying place is of no concern to me,
In the O'Connell circle let it be,
As to my funeral, all pomp is vain,
Illustrious people does prefer it plain."

== Nickname ==
Moran's nickname derived from a poem written by Anthony Coyle, Bishop of Raphoe about Saint Mary of Egypt. According to legend, she had followed pilgrims to Jerusalem with the intent of seducing them, then, turning penitent on finding herself prevented from entering the Church of the Holy Sepulchre by a supernatural force, she fled to the desert and spent the remainder of her life in solitary penance. When she was at the point of death, God sent Zosimas of Palestine to hear her confession and give her Holy Communion, and a lion to dig her grave. The poem has the intolerable cadence of the eighteenth century, but was so popular, and so often called for, that Moran was soon nicknamed "Zozimus", and by that name is remembered.

== Works ==
Some of Zozimus's rhymes survive as songs, such as Saint Patrick was a Gentleman

Saint Patrick was a gentleman,
He came of decent people,
In Dublin town he built a church,
And upon't put a steeple.

as well as The Twangman, Ye Men of Sweet Liberties Hall and The Finding of Moses.

In Praise of Potheen

O long life to the man who invented potheen -
Sure the Pope ought to make him a martyr -
If myself was this moment Victoria, the Queen,
I'd drink nothing but whiskey and wather.

The Song of Zozimus

Gather round me bois, will yez
Gather round me
And hear what I have to say,
Before ould Sally brings me
My bread and jug of tay.

I live in Faddle Alley,
Off Blackpitts near the Coombe;
With my poor wife called Sally,
In a narrow, dirty room.

Gather round me, and stop yer noise,
Gather round me till my tale is told;
Gather round me, ye girls and ye boys,
Till I tell yez stories of the days of old;

Gather round me, all ye ladies fair,
And ye gentlemen of renown;
Listen, listen, and to me repair,
Whilst I sing of beauteous Dublin town.

== Legacy ==
- A private art gallery in Dublin – Gallery Zozimus – is named after him.
- Zozimus Bar, a cocktail bar in Dublin, is also named for him.
- The magazine Zozimus, 1870–1872
- Zoz, or the Irish Charivari, 1876–1879
- A New York collection of stories The Zozimus Papers (1889)
- A 2007 compendium of Irish comic poetry Ireland's Other Poetry: Anonymous to Zozimus. Several of Zozimus's poems were included.

== Biographical and other texts ==
- Yeats, WB (1893) "Zozimus, Michael Moran, the Last of the Gleemen" in: Yeats's Celtic Twilight printed prev. as "The Last Gleeman" from The National Observer
- Gulielmus, Dubliniensis Humoriensis (1976) Memoir of the Great Original Zozimus (Michael Moran) the Celebrated Dublin Street Rhymer and Reciter, with His Songs, Sayings and Recitations; facsimile ed. (Carraig chapbooks) Blackrock (Co. Dublin): Carraig Books ISBN 0-902512-11-0 (original ed.: Dublin: M'Glashan & Gill, 1871)
- Boylan, Henry (1978) "Michael Moran (Zozimus)" in: A Dictionary of Irish Biography. Dublin: Gill and Macmillan
- Harte, Frank (1978) Songs of Dublin. Dublin: Gilbert
- Uíbh Eachach, Vivian (1990) Zozimus agus a Chairde ('Zozimus and his Friends'). [Dublin?]: An Gúm (retold for children)
- Zimmerman, Georges Denis (2002) Songs of Irish Rebellion: Irish Political Street Ballads and Rebel Songs, 1780–1900. Dublin: Four Courts Press
- Jackson, John Wyse & Hector McDonnell (2007) Ireland's Other Poetry: Anonymous to Zozimus. Lilliput Press ISBN 978-1-84351-122-9
- O Meara, Liam: Zozimus, The Life and Works of Michael Moran, Riposte Books ISBN 9781901596069
- McCall, P. J. (1945). "Zozimus". Dublin Historical Record. 7 (4). Old Dublin Society: 134–149. ISSN 0012-6861. JSTOR 30082517.
