= Clohamon =

Village in County Wexford, Ireland

Coordinates: 52°38′N 6°37′W

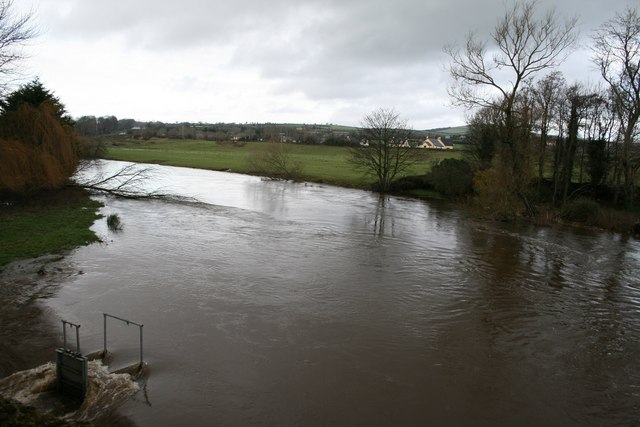
Winter Floods, Clohamon, Co. Wexford.

Clohamon (Irish: Cloch Ámainn) is a small, rural village and townland near Bunclody in County Wexford, Ireland. Located on the River Slaney, Clonmahon's bridge dates to the late 18th or early 19th century. Previously the site of a large mill, there is now a meat processing factory (operated by Slaney Foods) in Clohamon.

== See also ==
- List of towns and villages in Ireland
