= Ray McAreavey =

Northern Irish musician (1944–2023)

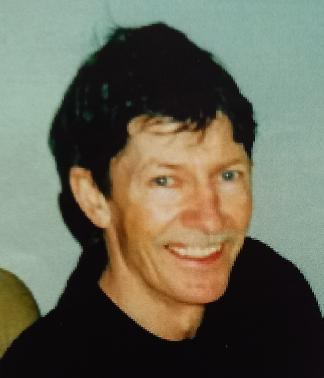
- McAreavey pictured in the 1990s
- Born: Raymond McAreavey; 1944; Belfast
- Died: 8 December 2023 (aged 78–79)
- Occupations: Teacher and singer
- Years active: 1967–2020
- Spouse: Colette (m. 1970)
- Children: 4
- Musical career
- Genres: Irish traditional music; Irish rebel music; Easy listening music
- Labels: Arran Records; Phoenix Records; Mint Records

Raymond McAreavey (1944–2023), most often called Ray McAreavey, was a musician from Belfast known for Irish rebel and folk music. He was lead singer of Belfast rebel band Wolfhound in the early 1970s.

== Biography ==
Ray McAreavey was born 1944, in the Clonard area off the lower Falls Road in West Belfast. He was amongst the youngest of a family of 12 siblings, including Gerry and Sadie.

McAreavey was present during the burning of Cupar Street on 15 August 1969 and in 2015 he disputed a unionist-leaning journalist's "The Pogrom Myth", which blamed Catholic rioters for starting the trouble.

He trained as a French polisher before becoming a teacher. During that time he was involved in cross-community work with schoolchildren of other faiths.

In 1970 he married Colette and they had four children – two sons and two daughters – and nine grandchildren. In later years McAreavey lived in the Malone area of Belfast and was a campaigner for fair rates.

McAreavey successfully battled cancer on three occasions before being diagnosed with Parkinson's disease in the mid-2010s. He died on 8 December 2023 and was buried at Roselawn crematorium on 14 December 2023 after a funeral Mass in St Brigid's Church, Belfast. It was attended by hundreds of mourners who heard him described as a "blessing in the life of so many".

== Music ==
Music was McAreavey's passion. He was a member of the well-known McPeake family, the Freemen, Wolfhound (1970), Pikemen (1977), Blackthorn (1983) – with whom he released the "Belfast Marathon" single in 1985 – and Casey's Crew. He played with the latter band, which included longtime friend and former Wolfhound and Pikemen bandmate Dominic McShane and well-known blues aficionado Rab McCullough, until the early 2020s. McAreavey had high praise for that group's sound. McAreavey played guitar skilfully, and G banjo and mandolin, but was known for his distinctive singing voice. He has been called an Irish music "legend".

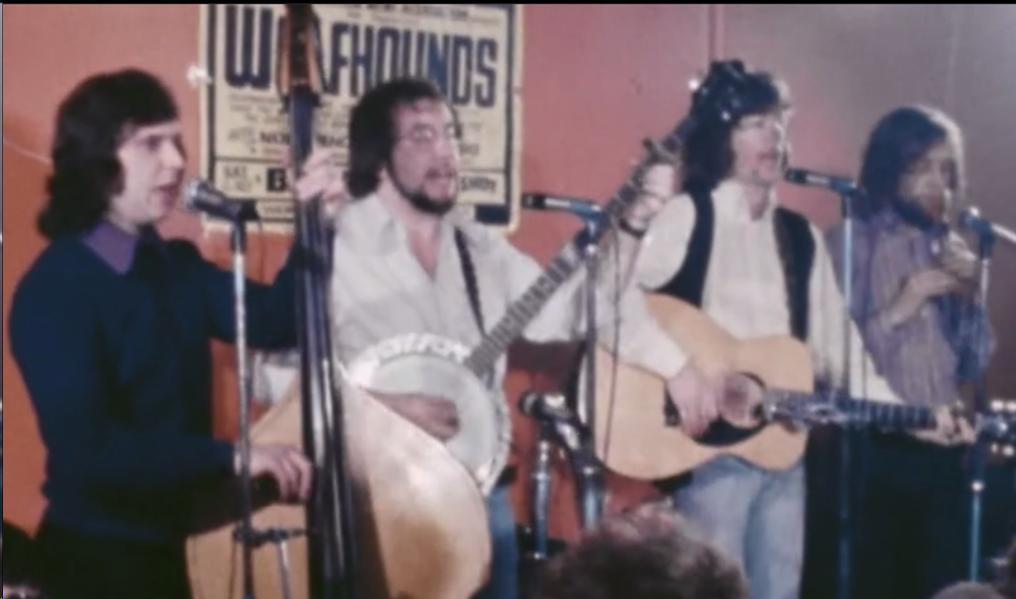
Wolfhound in October 1974

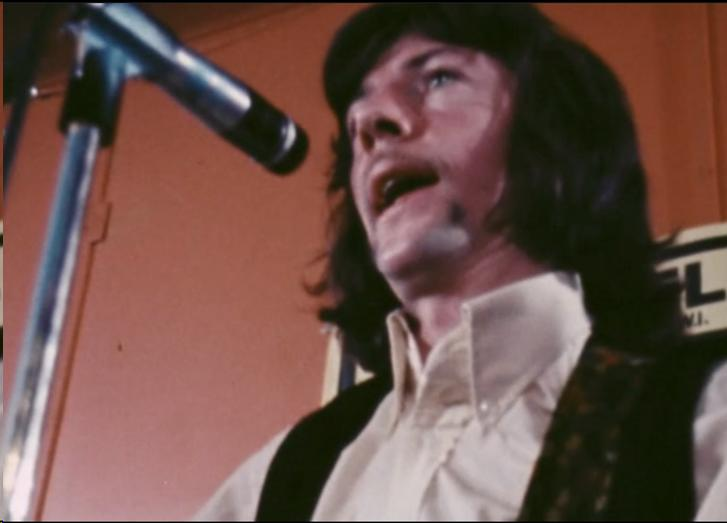
McAreavey in October 1974

The Wolfhound singles "Over the Wall (Crumlin Kangaroos)" and its sequel, "The Magnificent Seven", about republican jail breaks, sold tens of thousands of copies throughout Ireland. The first of these featured the 'voice' of Rev. Ian Paisley as portrayed by band member Billy Tierney. The band also performed a daring stunt around that time, gaining admission to Armagh Prison under the guise of having been sent by the Catholic Church, and playing for the female prisoners until the ruse was discovered.

While on a short tour to North America c. 1973, including two weeks in Detroit, a promoter named Bill Fuller was taken by McAreavey's voice and asked him to go semi-professional and undertake a number of residencies in the United States. This idea did not come to pass. Wolfound also played several concerts at the New Windsor House (now McVeigh's Irish Bar) in Toronto. While the band never played in England, they did play in the Dundalk/Drogheda area on a number of occasions and held a residency in the Lower Deck pub in Portobello, Dublin. With Wolfhound, McAreavey was both a singer of Irish rebel music and a balladeer.

McAreavey's voice was heard on many singles and albums issued by the groups he was a member of. In 1976, McAreavey also released a solo album, "The Blood Stained Bandage", which contained a number of Irish rebel songs. His "Songs from the Heart" album came out around the year 2000.

In 2019, McAreavey was interviewed for the TG4 documentary Ceol Chogadh na Saoirse which examined the history of songs documenting Ireland's struggle for freedom.
