= Bridie Gallagher =

Irish singer (1924–2012)

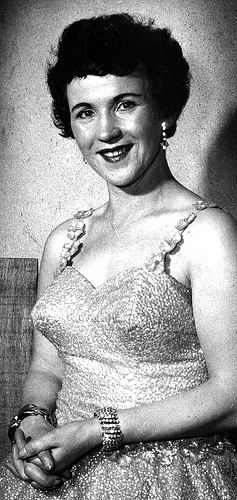

Background information
- Also known as: "The Girl from Donegal"
- Born: Bridget Ena Gallagher; 7 September 1924; Creeslough, County Donegal, Ireland
- Died: 9 January 2012 (aged 87) Belfast, Northern Ireland
- Genre: Irish
- Occupation: Singer
- Instrument: Vocals
- Years active: 1956–2000
- Labels: Beltona, Decca, London Records (US), Emerald Records, Parlophone, Capitol (US), Pye Records

Bridget Ena Gallagher (7 September 1924 – 9 January 2012) was an Irish singer, affectionately known as "The Girl from Donegal". She has been described as "Ireland's first international pop star".

Gallagher shot to fame in 1956 with her recording of "A Mother's Love's A Blessing" and achieved international acclaim with her legendary rendition of "The Boys From County Armagh". During her career, which spanned over six decades, she appeared in many leading venues across the globe. She also made songs such as "The Homes of Donegal" famous.

== Career ==
Gallagher started her singing in the Creeslough Hall with a local Ceili Band started by Bill Gallagher. The Creeslough Hall was owned by Jim Mc Caffrey and Bridie would make many more visits to the Creeslough Hall in her home town throughout her long and successful career. Bridie's talent was soon spotted in the 1950s by Billy Livingstone (no relation to her husband) who was a talent scout for Decca Records, and she went to Belfast, which was to become her base.

Gallagher holds the record for the largest number of people in attendance in the Albert Hall London, with over 7,500 people, a record that was never equalled as it went on to become an all-seater venue. Gallagher become world-famous and travelled all over the world, United States, Canada, Europe, Australia and was known as "The Girl from Donegal". Bridie played in many of the world's best known theatres, including London's Royal Albert Hall, Sydney Opera House and Carnegie Hall in New York. Bridie sang mainly ballads or as they later became known as Country and Irish. One of her best known songs was "The Boys From The County Armagh", which sold over 250,000 copies, the biggest-selling Irish single at that time.

Bridie also recorded "Cottage by the Lee", written by Irish songwriter, Dick Farrelly. Farrelly achieved worldwide fame with his classic song, "The Isle of Innisfree", which was originally a worldwide hit for Bing Crosby and it was chosen by movie director, John Ford as the main theme music for his film, "The Quiet Man".

Gallagher had her own radio show on RTÉ as well as many appearances on television (RTÉ, BBC, UTV, and coast to coast in the United States).

== Personal life ==
Gallagher lived in Belfast for most of her life. There, she married Robert (Bob) Livingstone and had two boys, Jim and Peter. In 1976, she lost her 21-year-old son Peter in a motorbike accident. "She never really got over that (accident)," said her son Jim, "but she just kept going." Jim later went on to tour with Gallagher. She was honoured by the people of Creeslough on 10 July 2000 with an event to celebrate her career. Members of her family from Creeslough and Donegal attended the event along with her two sisters and their families who travelled from Glasgow to be there along with an estimated crowd of 2,500 fans. A plaque paying tribute to Gallagher was unveiled. The following day she was honoured by Donegal County Council when they held a Civic Reception for her. "Bridie blazed the trail for many artists who followed after her and I'm sure that many of them looked upon her as a role model as they started their careers in the music world," council chairman Charlie Bennett said at the ceremony.

Gallagher died at her home in Belfast on 9 January 2012 at the age of 87. Her burial took place in her native Creeslough.

== Discography ==
=== Singles ===
- A Mother's Love's a Blessing/ I'll Remember You Love, In My Prayers (1956)
- The Boys From the County Armagh/ Kilarney and You (July 1957)
- The Girl from Donegal / Take this Message to my Mother (1958)
- At the Close of an Irish Day / Two Little Orphans (1958)
- The Hills of Donegal / My Mother's Last Goodbye (1958)
- I'll Forgive But I'll Never Forget / Poor Little Orphan Boy (1958)
- Hillside in Scotland / Johnny Gray (1958)
- The Kylemore Pass / Cutting the Corn in Creeslough (1958)
- Goodbye Johnny / The Faithful Sailor Boy (1958)
- I Found You Out/ It's A Sin To Tell A Lie (December 1958)
- If I Were a Blackbird / The Moon Behind the Hill (1959)
- Moonlight in Mayo / In The Heart of Donegal (1959)
- I Left Ireland and My Mother Because we were Poor / Star of Donegal (1959)
- Noreen Bawn / Moonlight on the River Shannon (1959)
- Hills of Glenswilly / The Old Wishin' Chair (1959)
- Orange Trees Growing in Old County Down / The Crolly Doll (1959)
- I'll Always Be With You / Stay With Me (May 1959)
- Irish Jaunting Car / Johnny My Love(1960)
- My Lovely Irish Rose / Don't Forget To Say I Love You (1960)
- Homes of Donegal / Ballyhoe (1960)
- Rose of Kilkenny / Shall My Soul Pass Through Old Ireland (1960)
- The Castlebar Fair / Home To Mayo (April 1962)
- Christmas in Old Dublin Town/ I'll Cry Tomorrow (November 1962)
- A Little Bunch of Violets/ The Bonny Boy (1966)
- The Wild Colonial Boy/ Poor Orphan Girl (1967)
- Destination Donegal / The Turfman From Ardee (1967)
- The Glen of Aherlow / Henry Joy (1967)
- Cottage on the Borderline / Rose of Mooncoin (December 1967)
- Swinging in the Lane / 5,000 Miles From Sligo (October 1970)
- If I Had My Life To Live Over / Golden Jubilee (1971)
- Just Like Your Daddy/ No Charge (March 1976)
- A Mother's Love's a Blessing / The Road To Creeslough (October 1976)

=== Extended plays ===
- The Girl From Donegal, No. 1 (1958)
- A1: The Girl From Donegal
- A2: Take This Message to My Mother
- B1: At The Close of an Irish Day
- B2: Two Little Orphans
- The Girl From Donegal, No. 2 (1958)
- A1: My Mother's Last Goodbye
- A2: The Faithful Sailor Boy
- B1: Killarney and You
- B2: The Road by the River
- The Girl From Donegal, No. 3 (1958)
- A1:Hill of Donegal
- A2: I'll Forgive But I'll Never Forget
- B1: The Boys From County Armagh
- B2: The Poor Orphan Boy
- Bridie Gallagher (1959)
- A: Moonlight on the Shannon River
- B1: I Left Ireland And Mother Because We Were Poor
- B2: The Hills of Glenswilly
- Bridie Gallagher (EP) (1959)
- A1: I Found You Out
- A2: Two-Faced Moon
- B1: It's A Sin To Tell A Lie
- B2: Somebody Cried at Your Wedding
- Bridie Gallagher Sings Irish Jaunting Car and other Irish Favourites (1960)
- A1: Irish Jaunting Car
- A2: My Lovely Irish Rose
- B1: Johnny Me Love
- B2: Rose of Kilkenny

=== Long Plays ===
- At Home With Bridie Gallagher (1962)
- Little Bunch of Violets (1966)
- In The Heart of Donegal (1968)
- Bridie Gallagher Sings Irish Requests (1970)
- The Half Door (1978)

Discography sources
