= Creeslough =

Village in County Donegal, Ireland

Creeslough An Craoslach
- Village
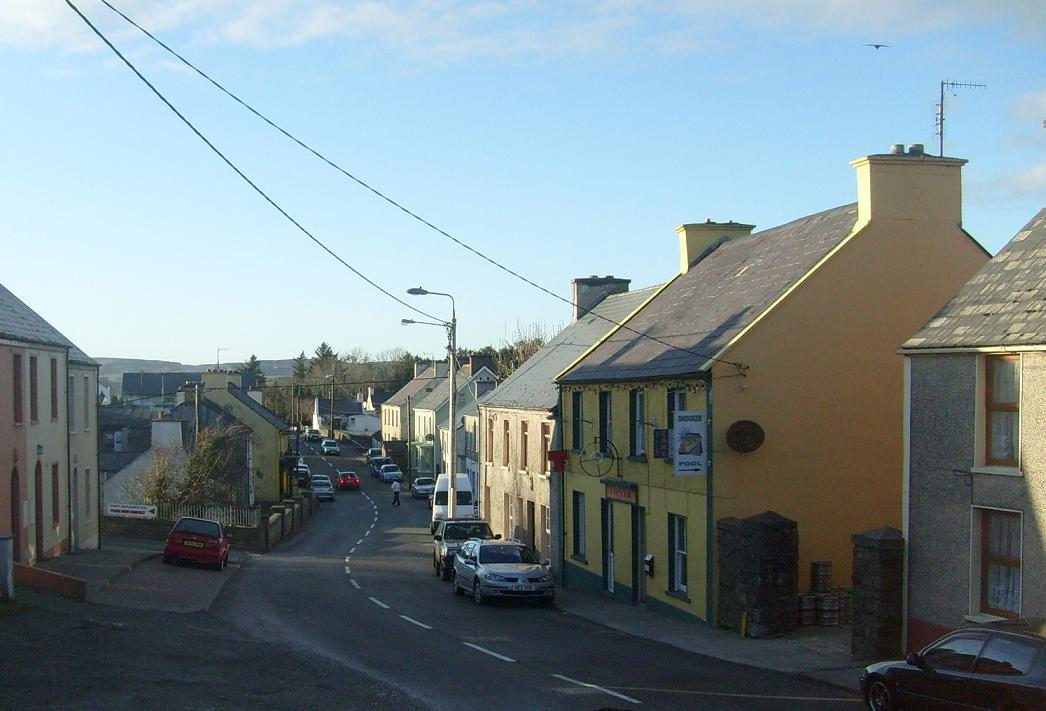
- Main Street

- Location in Ireland
- Coordinates: 55°07′19″N 7°54′25″W
- Country: Ireland
- Province: Ulster
- County: County Donegal
- Barony: Kilmacrenan

Population (2022)
  - Total: 398
- Time zone: UTC+0 (WET)
  - Summer (DST): UTC-1 (IST (WEST))
- Irish Grid Reference: C059305
- Website: www.creeslough.com

Creeslough (/ˈkriːslɒx/ KREES-lokh, locally /ˈkriːslɑː/ KREES-lah; Irish: An Craoslach [ənˠ ˈkˠɾˠiːsˠˌl̪ˠax]) is a village in County Donegal, Ireland, 12 kilometres (7 mi) south of Dunfanaghy on the N56 road.

== Name ==
The English name 'Creeslough' (occasionally 'Cresslough') is an anglicised respelling of an Irish name, the modern official spelling of which is An Craoslach (including the definite article An). According to the Placenames Database of Ireland, this means "the gorge". Under the Official Languages Act 2003, only the Irish name of Creeslough electoral division has official status, because part of it is in the Gaeltacht, whereas Creeslough village is outside the Gaeltacht and its English name has equal status. Craoslach is usually interpreted as craos+loch; where loch means "lake", while craos literally means "gullet, throat" and metaphorically can mean either a gap or gluttony. In the 1830s, John O'Donovan glossed the name as "Craoslaoch [sic] swallowing lake; throat lake", and Patrick Weston Joyce glossed it in 1875 as "Craos-loch — a lake that swallows up everything". In 2000, Lawrence Donegan wrote:

Craos Loch in Irish, meaning Throat Lake or Gullet Lake. Why? Because there was a tiny lake at the top of the village that gathered a lot of rainwater from the surrounding hills and leaked only a little away through a tiny stream. Where did all the water go? It had been swallowed by the hungry lake, obviously. Why not call the village Hungry Lake? It wasn't poetic enough.

Suggested alternative derivations are craos+lacha[n] "duck[s] throat", or crioslach (or variant críoslach) "limit, border". Niall Ó Dónaill advised the Placenames Branch in 1962 that, although there was evidence that Crioslach was the older Irish form, it had long been changed to An Craoslach.

== History ==
Population history of Creeslough
Year	Pop.	±%
1841	235	—
1851	272	+15.7%
1861	229	−15.8%
1871	154	−32.8%
1881	155	+0.6%
1891	132	−14.8%
1901	179	+35.6%
1911	150	−16.2%
1926	156	+4.0%
1936	199	+27.6%
1946	167	−16.1%
1951	170	+1.8%
1956	198	+16.5%
1961	242	+22.2%
1966	262	+8.3%
1971	269	+2.7%
1981	352	+30.9%
1986	340	−3.4%
1991	299	−12.1%
1996	300	+0.3%
2002	304	+1.3%
2006	327	+7.6%
2011	410	+25.4%
2016	393	−4.1%
2022	398	+1.3%

Evidence of ancient settlement in the area includes a number of ringfort, holy well, enclosure and burial sites in the townlands of Creeslough, Killoughcarran and Masiness. Ards Forest Park, to the north of the village, contains some megalithic tombs, ringforts and a Mass rock.

Nearby Doe Castle, a tower house with a surrounding bawn, dates from the 1420s. Historically associated with MacSuibhne clan, the castle was used as a base by Owen Roe O'Neill during the Irish Confederate Wars. It was restored between 2002 and 2005.

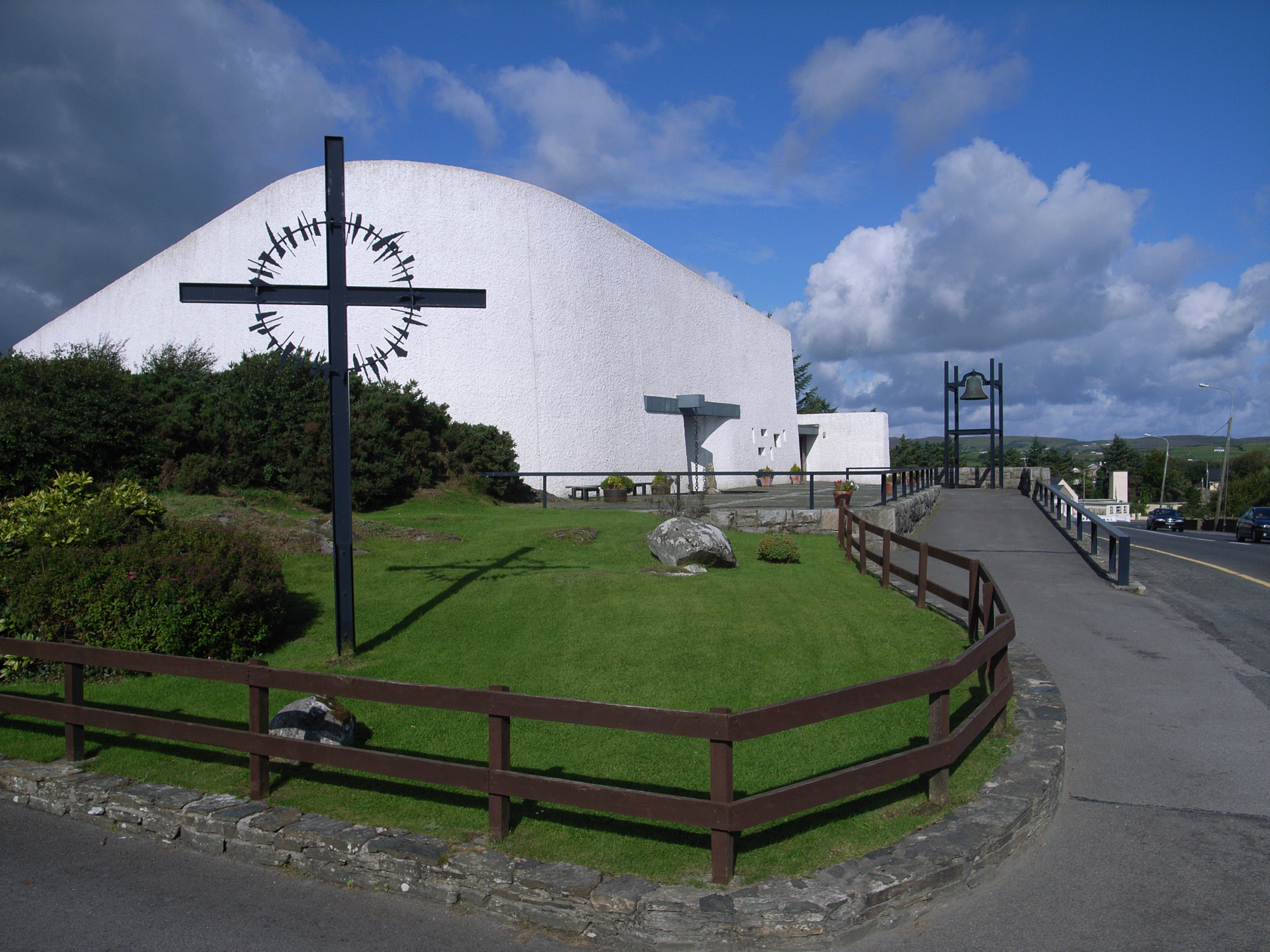
St. Michael's Church, designed by Liam McCormick in 1971

The local Catholic church, St. Michael's Church, is known locally as 'the chapel' and was designed by Derry architect Liam McCormick in 1971. It is reputedly designed to reflect the shape of the nearby table mountain of Muckish.

On 7 October 2022, an explosion at Creeslough destroyed a shop and Applegreen petrol station, as well as the adjoining apartment block, resulting in ten deaths and multiple injuries.

== Transport ==
Creeslough railway station opened on 9 March 1903, closed for passenger traffic on 3 June 1940, and finally closed altogether on 6 January 1947.

== Education ==
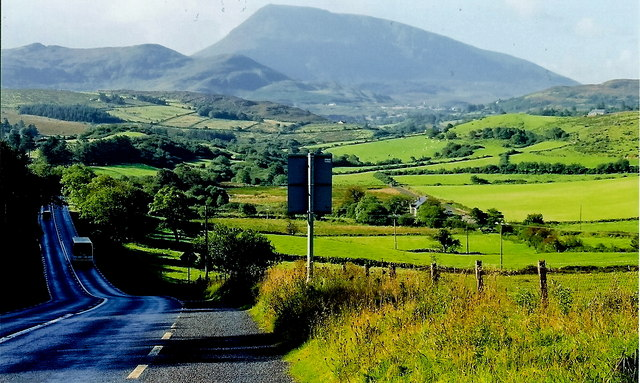
A view of the countryside around Creeslough with Muckish mountain in the background

The area around Creeslough is served by three primary schools:

- Scoil Mhuire – Roman Catholic, 142 pupils (2011 figures)
- Creeslough National School – Church of Ireland, 20 pupils (2011 figures)
- Glassan National School – Roman Catholic, 29 pupils (2011 figures), located 5 km to the west of Creeslough village

== People ==
- Kathleen Antonelli, programmer of ENIAC, the first ever computer
- Thomas Bartholomew Curran, barrister and Anti-Parnellite
- Lawrence Donegan, Scottish journalist and musician, author of No News at Throat Lake (2000). Donegan lived in Creeslough for a short time.
- Bridie Gallagher, singer described as "Ireland's first truly international pop star"
- Bernard Lafferty, butler and heir to Doris Duke
- Neil McBride (Niall Mac Gioll Bhridé), poet, author, and lyricist
- Martin McElhinney, Gaelic footballer
- Colm McFadden, Gaelic footballer
- James McNulty, activist for Irish Independence and father of Kathleen Antonelli
- Christy Toye, Gaelic footballer

== In popular culture ==
- No News at Throat Lake is a memoir by Lawrence Donegan about his year living in Creeslough as a reporter for the bi-weekly newspaper, Tirconaill Tribune.
- The area has featured in a number of Irish folk songs, including "Cutting the Corn in Creeslough" which has been covered by Daniel O'Donnell and Creeslough native Bridie Gallagher.

== See also ==
- List of towns and villages in the Republic of Ireland
- Sheephaven Bay
