= Tommy Keenan =

Irish basketball player

Personal information
- Full name: Thomas Keenan
- Nationality: Irish
- Born: 19 May 1923; Glasgow, Scotland
- Died: 7 April 1981 (aged 57); Hornchurch, England

Sport
- Sport: Basketball

Thomas Keenan (19 May 1923 – 7 April 1981) was an Irish basketball player. He competed in the men's tournament at the 1948 Summer Olympics.
