= Jackets Green =

Irish ballad

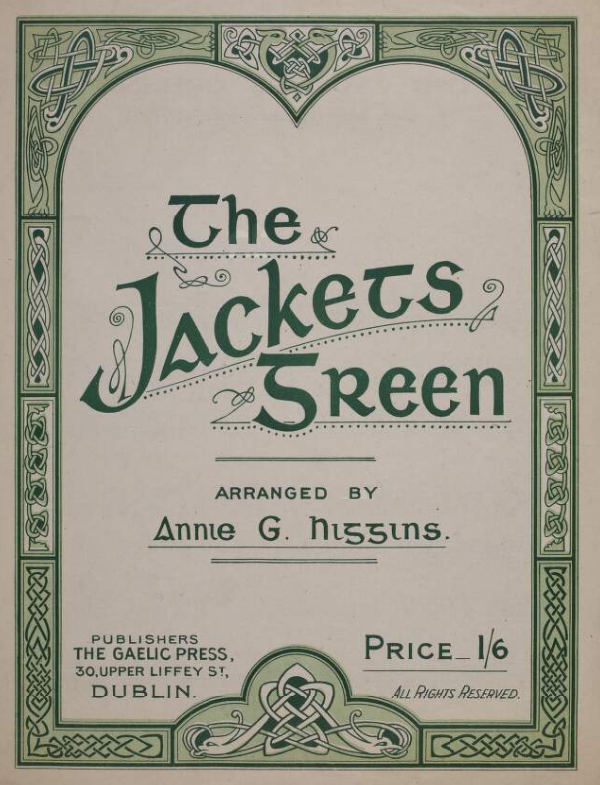

Song by Michael Scanlan
- Genre: Folk ballad
- Songwriter(s): Michael Scanlan

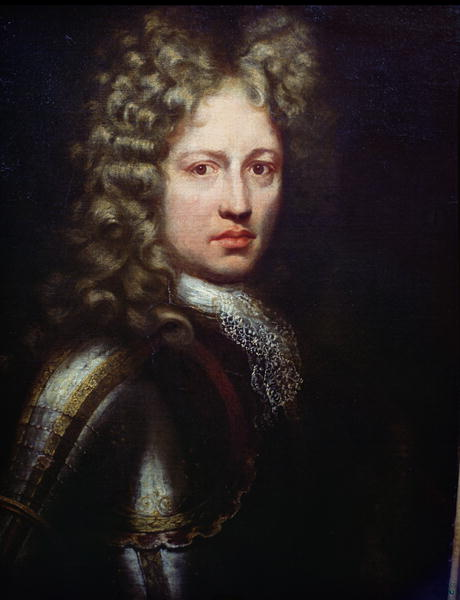
The song revolved around Donal, a soldier fighting under Patrick Sarsfield.

Jackets Green is an Irish ballad by Michael Scanlan (1833–1917) concerning an Irish woman and her beloved, an Irish soldier fighting in the Jacobite army of Patrick Sarsfield during the Williamite War of the late 17th century. Like some other "patriotic" Irish ballads, it includes romantic rather than historically accurate descriptions. This includes, at its core, the assertion that Sarsfield's men wore green uniforms, when the Irish Brigade, initiated by the Jacobite soldiers under Sarsfield's command, actually wore red uniforms.

== Background ==
During the Williamite War in Ireland, the French and Irish troops fighting for James II of England and VII of Scotland had fought their way back to Limerick. Here, the French leader Lauzun declined to defend the city against the pursuing Williamites, saying it could be taken "with rotten apples". He led his troops to Galway and returned to France.

Sarsfield, however, believed the city could be defended. When a Williamite deserter gave information that William III of England and his officers had ridden forward ahead of their ammunition train and were waiting for it, Sarsfield led a raiding party, led by the rapparee Galloping Hogan, through the Silvermine Mountains. One of Sarsfield's men fell behind when his horse lost a shoe, and spoke with a woman also walking; she was the wife of a Williamite soldier on the way to meet her man, and told him that the Williamites' password was "Sarsfield". The Jacobites used the password to get into the camp - Sarsfield himself shouting "Sarsfield's the word, and Sarsfield's the man!" and they captured 150 wagons of ammunition, approximately 30 cannons and mortars, plus 12 wagons of provisions, all of which they blew up.

The result of Sarsfield's ride was that William of Orange's siege of Limerick failed after a fortnight, and the king sailed back to England. However, the hero of the song, Donal, a soldier in Sarsfield's Jacobite army, is killed at Garryowen, an area within Limerick's walls, during the siege. The song calls on all Irish women to love only those who "wear the jackets green".

This reference to "jackets green" is a romantic delusion as Sarsfield's Irish Brigades wore red uniforms, in part because they considered themselves to be the true British army, supporters of the Catholic James Francis Edward Stuart, rather than the Protestant William III.

Sarsfield and his defence of Limerick are a touchstone of Irish national feeling, and the song by a Limerick-born poet who emigrated to Chicago was popular among supporters of the Irish Republican Brotherhood.

The song, described as "imaginative historical romance", was written by Michael Scanlan who had emigrated from Ireland to the United States in the 1840s.

== Lyrics ==
When I was a maiden fair and young,
On the pleasant banks of Lee,
No bird that in the greenwood sung,
Was half so blithe and free.
My heart ne'er beat with flying feet,
No love sang me his queen,
Till down the glen rode Sarsfield's men,
And they wore the jackets green.

Young Donal sat on his gallant grey
Like a king on a royal seat,
And my heart leaped out on his regal way
To worship at his feet.
O Love, had you come in those colours dressed,
And wooed with a soldier's mein
I'd have laid my head on your throbbing breast
For the sake of your jacket green.

No hoarded wealth did my love own,
Save the good sword that he bore;
But I loved him for himself alone
And the colour bright he wore.
For had he come in England's red
To make me England's queen,
I'd rove the high green hills instead
For the sake of the Irish green.

When William stormed with shot and shell
At the walls of Garryowen,
In the breach of death my Donal fell,
And he sleeps near the Treaty Stone.
That breach the foeman never crossed
While he swung his broadsword keen;
But I do not weep my darling lost,
For he fell in his jacket green.

When Sarsfield sailed away I wept
As I heard the wild ochone.
I felt, then dead as the men who slept
'Neath the fields of Garryowen.
White Ireland held my Donal blessed,
No wild sea rolled between,
Till I would fold him to my breast
All robed in his Irish green.

My soul has sobbed like waves of woe,
That sad o'er tombstones break,
For I buried my heart in his grave below,
For his and for Ireland's sake.
And I cry. "Make way for the soldier's bride
In your halls of death, sad queen
For I long to rest by my true love's side
And wrapped in the folds of green."

I saw the Shannon's purple tide
Roll by the Irish town,
As I stood in the breach by Donal's side
When England's flag went down.
And now it lowers when I seek the skies,
Like a blood red curse between.
I weep, but 'tis not women's sighs
Will raise our Irish green.

Oh, Ireland, sad is thy lonely soul,
And loud beats the winter sea,
But sadder and higher the wild waves roll
O'er the hearts that break for thee.
Yet grief shall come to our heartless foes,
And their thrones in the dust be seen,
So, Irish Maids, love none but those
Who wear the jackets green.
