= Michael Scanlan (poet) =

Michael Scanlan (10 November 1833 – 6 March 1917) was an Irish nationalist, editor, poet and writer. Known as the "Fenian poet" or the "poet laureate of American Fenianism", he was the author of a number of Irish ballads such as the "Bold Fenian Men" and "The Jackets Green".

== Life ==
Scanlan was born in Castlemahon, County Limerick in November 1833. He emigrated to the United States at fifteen years of age and with his brothers, John and Mortimer, settled in Chicago. They started a sweets (candy) business which became successful. Scanlan joined the Irish Republican Brotherhood (IRB) and wrote articles and poems for a number of newspapers.

He supported the Fenian invasion of Canada (31 May 1866), following the leadership of William R. Roberts, and was a member of a body known as the Senate. After the failure of that enterprise, he became editor of a new newspaper, the Irish Republic. He edited the Irish Republic, described in its masthead as a "journal of liberty, literature, and social progress", together with Patrick William Dunne and fellow IRB exile David Bell.

In the Irish Republic, Scanlon and Bell promoted physical-force Fenianism, while disparaging the general clericalism and pro-Democratic-Party leanings of rival Irish-American papers. The Irish Republic supported the Radical Republican agenda for Reconstruction, black suffrage and equal rights.

After the Irish Republic ceased publication in 1873, Scanlon continued writing for Irish and American newspapers. He later became a senior official in the American administration in Washington. In 1887 he was appointed chief of the Bureau of Statistics in the State Department. He retired in 1912.

He had a son and three daughters. He died, aged eighty-four years, in the hospital of St. Mary of Nazareth in Chicago.
