= Arthur Colahan =

- Born: 12 August 1884; Enniskillen, County Fermanagh, Ireland
- Origin: Ireland
- Died: 15 September 1952 (aged 68) Leicester, England
- Occupation: Songwriter

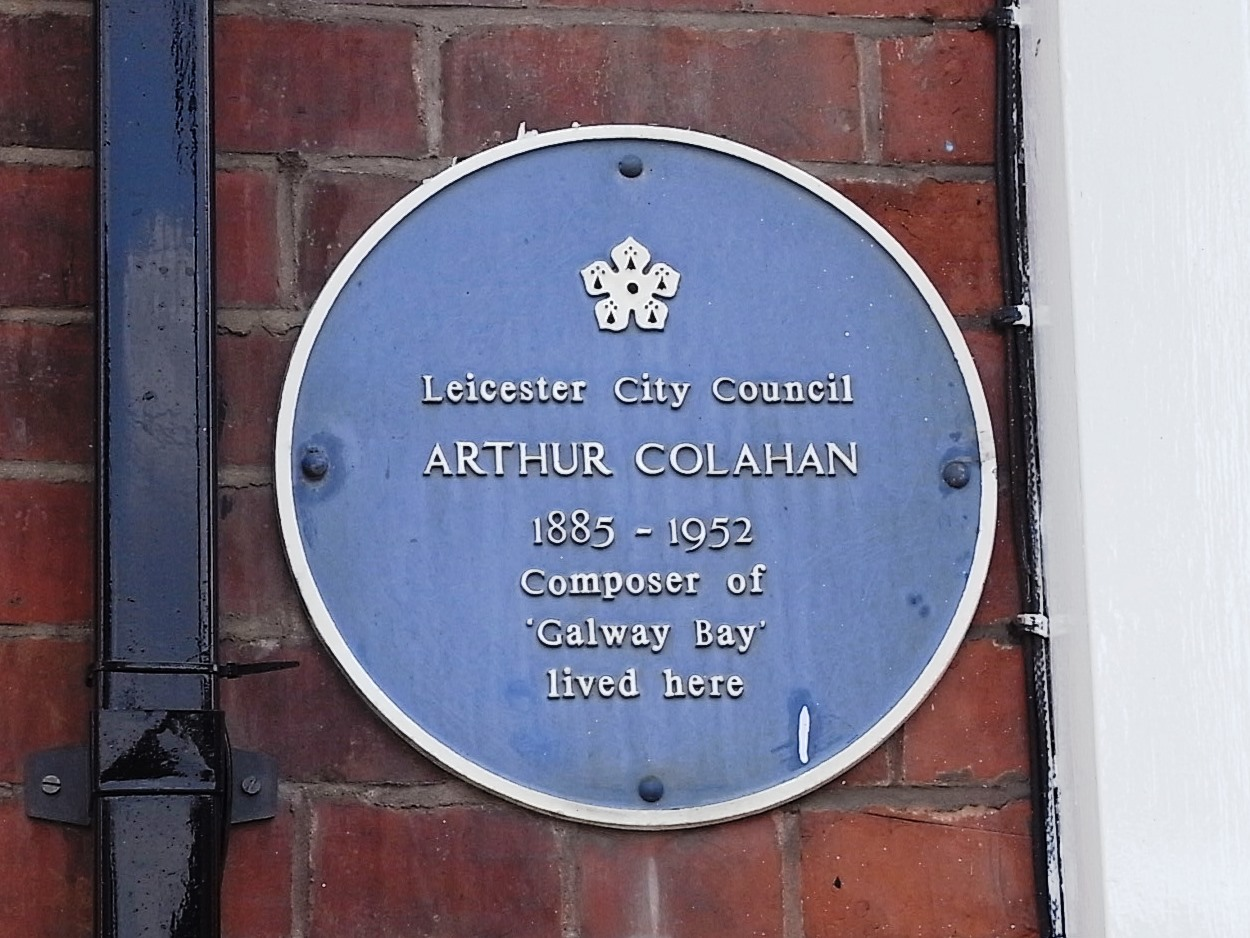
Arthur Colahan Blue Plaque, 9-11 Prebend Street, Leicester

Arthur Nicholas Whistler Colahan (12 August 1884 – 15 September 1952) was an Irish medical doctor, British Army officer and songwriter.

== Career ==
Born Nicholas Arthur Colahan at Alexandra Terrace, Enniskillen, County Fermanagh, Ireland, he was eldest child of Nicholas Colahan (1853–1930) and Elisabeth (Lizzie) Quinn of Limerick (born c.1866) and the grandson of Professor Nicholas Colahan (1806–1890). His family moved to Galway, and he grew up there.

After completing his secondary education at St Joseph's Patrician College, Galway ('The Bish') and Mungret College, Limerick, he enrolled at University College Dublin in 1900, did an Arts degree then studied medicine. He transferred to University College Galway and graduated in 1913. He was a member of the college Literary and Debating Society and participated in drama.

He began his medical career in the County Infirmary in Galway, and then moved to Holles Street maternity hospital. He joined the Royal Army Medical Corps, and was badly affected by mustard gas in India. After the war he settled in Leicester, where he spent the rest of his career as a neurological specialist.

Colahan was a composer of popular songs. His most famous work is Galway Bay, which was popularised by Bing Crosby, and was the biggest selling record of all time at one stage. Some say this was composed in the home of Dr Morris at 1 Montpelier Terrace, Galway, while others believe it was in The Vicars Croft on Taylor's Hill, Galway, from where one can see Galway Bay.

Other songs written by Colahan included Maccushla Mine, Asthoreen Bawn, Until God's Day, The Kylemore Pass and The Claddagh Ring.
