= Paddy Berry =

Irish singer (born 1937)

Patrick Joseph Berry (born 12 October 1937) is an Irish traditional singer from Wexford, Ireland. Born and raised in Scar, Duncormick, Paddy Berry now lives in Drinagh, on the outskirts of Wexford Town. Paddy is a well known performer of local Wexford ballads, as well as a songwriter and song and folklore collector. He has made a major contribution to the revival of traditional music, song and dance in Ireland over the past fifty years.

Paddy has been a prominent member of Comhaltas Ceoltóirí Éireann for nearly five decades and has been involved in various cultural education initiatives. His very important contribution has been recognised by fellow musicians and also earned Paddy a special lifetime achievement award from the president of Ireland, Mary McAleese, in 2003.

Paddy Berry has published three recordings and three print collections of County Wexford Ballads.

Paddy is the second of nine children and his youngest brother Phil is also a well-known traditional singer.

== Publications ==
- Wexford Ballads. Foillstheoiri Cois Slaine, 1982
- More Wexford Ballads. Wexford. 1987
- A Third Collection of Wexford Ballads. Wexford 2021

== Recordings ==
- Paddy Berry sings Wexford Ballads (1985)
- Sing Us a Song Paddy (1999)
- Sing Again Paddy (2005)

== See also ==
- Traditional Irish Singers
