= Alicia Adélaide Needham =

Irish composer

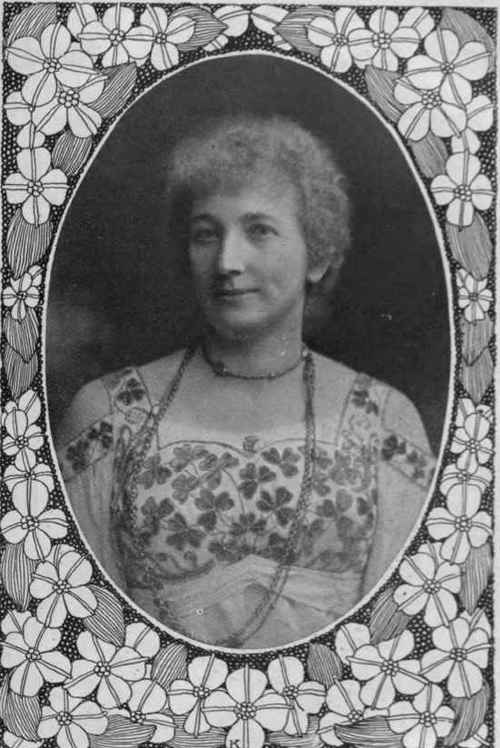
- Born: Alicia Adélaide Montgomery; 31 October 1863; Oldcastle, County Meath, Ireland
- Died: 24 December 1945 (aged 82)
- Education: Royal Academy of Music, London; Royal College of Music
- Occupations: Composer, Suffragette
- Spouse: Joseph Needham (m. 1892; died 1920)
- Children: Joseph Needham

Alicia Adélaide Needham (née Montgomery; 31 October 1863 – 24 December 1945) was an Irish composer of songs and ballads. A committed suffragette, she was the first woman to conduct at the Royal Albert Hall, London, and the first female president of the National Eisteddfod of Wales (in 1906).

== Life ==
Needham was born in Oldcastle, Co. Meath, daughter of John Wilson Montgomery (1834-1911), master of the Bailieborough Workhouse and a clerk to the poor law board of guardians; he was also an antiquarian, contributing to local newspapers on the subject, and produced some books of poetry, becoming known as the "Bard of Bailieborough". The family subsequently lived at Downpatrick in County Down. She went to boarding school in Derry for four years and spent the following year in Castletown, Isle of Man. She studied at the Royal Academy of Music in London, first for one year only (most likely the academic year 1880–1): piano with the Irish pianist and composer Arthur O'Leary, harmony and counterpoint with Francis William Davenport and occasionally with George Alexander Macfarren and Ebenezer Prout. It is not clear what she did in the intervening three years before she resumed her studies in 1884, but she then graduated in 1887 and became a Licentiate of the Academy in 1889. In 1893 she also passed the examinations to the Associateship of the Royal College of Music. In the meantime she had married the London-based physician Joseph Needham in 1892 and in 1900 gave birth to their only child, also called Joseph.

Actively supported by her husband, who organised concerts for her and arranged her earliest publications, her musical career began in 1894 with a number of publications and piano and song recitals. Altogether she wrote some 700 compositions, most of which songs, but there are also some duets, trios and quartets for voices and piano, some piano music, some orchestrations of songs, choral hymns, marches for brass bands, and one church service. More than 200 published works can be found in the British Library, some of which are song cycles and similar collections with up to 12 pieces. She seems to have stopped composing before 1920 and little was heard of her henceforth. She died, largely unnoticed by the public, on Christmas Eve 1945 in London.

Thanks to her son Joseph Needham's later fame as a highly distinguished biochemist and sinologist, the private belongings – including the papers of his mother – of him were archived, first at the University of Bath, and now in Cambridge. This includes published music, private and professional correspondence for the years 1877 to 1921, extensive diaries covering the years 1879 to 1924, photographs, notebooks, etc. The overview of the "Joseph Needham Papers" at Cambridge mentions that her extensive diaries reveal a very unhappy marriage, but there is no word about it in her typescript autobiography, which she had intended for publication. In this source she describes her early career from the mid-1890s thus: "For ten years, I might say twenty years and more, songs, piano soli, quartettes, trios, song cycles, hymns, all flowed from my happy pen. They were so prolific, these years, that I sometimes, if tired, feared to look at a poetry book lest a poem might strike me and set itself instantaneously to music in my head, and I should be inclined to run away and set it down.” An active member to and benefactress of the Pan-Celtic movement which existed from 1899 until c. 1910, and one of the attendants of the Pan-Celtic Congress of Caernarfon of 1904 (who was photographed there in Celtic revival dress and modern dress), she was made the first woman President of the National Eisteddfod of Wales in 1906, with fellow presidents of the calibre like the Lord Mayor and the Bishop of London and two lords. A few years later she was also made a "Bardess of Wales", i.e. a member of the Welsh Gorsedd of the Bards of the Isle of Britain, under the title "Harp of Ireland". She was the first woman to conduct at the Royal Albert Hall. And in 1910 she was a V.I.P. at a banquet given in Dublin by Lord Aberdeen, the then Lord Lieutenant of Ireland, to honour 'Irish Women of Letters'.

Her biggest single commercial success was when she won the competition for the Prize Song for the coronation of King Edward VII in 1902. More than 300 composers sent in their contribution, and Alicia Needham went away with the £100 award for a song which she wrote in a last-minute fashion while she was accidentally staying in a room at Dublin's Shelbourne Hotel.

The death of her husband in 1920 meant a serious change in Alicia Needham's course of life. She was forced to sell the house and furniture, paintings, books and china and had to move into a considerably smaller flat in a less fashionable district of the city. She writes in her autobiography (p. 67-8): "[...] my music-room shelves left empty, and four tons of books sent away to storage, all the best things and treasures sold, I only keeping enough for a little flat!". She probably lived from the sales of the house and family possessions for a few years, but her decline is clearly visible in that she doesn't seem to have composed any more after 1920, her collection of correspondence ends in 1921, her diaries end in 1924, her autobiography in 1926. The "Joseph Needham Papers" in Cambridge reveal that she turned to astrology and occultism; she began to believe in the rebirthing of the dead and devoted time to so-called "spirit photography". Notices in the Irish Times and the British Medical Journal of 1933 reveal that by then she was in serious financial difficulty and had health problems, with a Dr. J.S. Crone of the Irish Literary Society organising a "testimonial". The last public notice about her is that she converted to the Catholic faith in December 1934.

== Selected works ==
- An Album of Hush Songs (1897)
- The Seventh English Edward (1902)
- A Bunch of Shamrocks: Irish Song Cycle for Four Solo Voices (1904)
- Twelve Small Songs for Small People (1904)
- Four Songs for Women Suffragists (1908)
- A Bunch of Heather: Scottish Song Cycle (1910)
- Army and Navy Songcycle (1912)

== Bibliography ==
- Annie Patterson: "Alicia Adelaide Needham", in: Weekly Irish Times, 9 June 1900
- Eithne Nic Pheadair [= Annie Patterson]: "Alicia Adelaide Needham", in: The Leader 23 (1916) 14, pp. 227–8
- Jennifer O'Connor & Axel Klein: "Needham, Alicia Adelaide", in: The Encyclopaedia of Music in Ireland, ed. H. White & B. Boydell (Dublin: UCD Press, 2013)
- Oxford DNB
