= Thomas P. Keenan =

Thomas Peter Keenan (1866–1927), from Castletownroche, County Cork, Ireland, is the composer of such songs as "The Boys From The County Armagh", "A Mother's Love's A Blessing" and "The Old Rustic Bridge by the Mill." His songs have been widely recorded, most recently by Louise Morrisey, Foster and Allen and Daniel O'Donnell.

He is buried in Castletownroche.
