= The Wolfe Tones discography =

Wolfe Tones discography
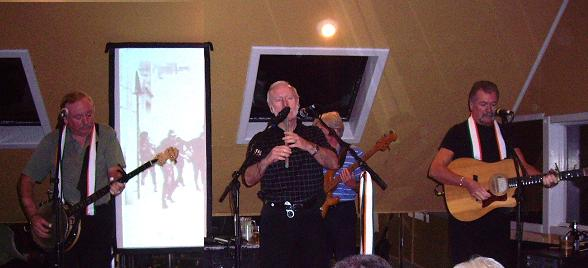
- The Wolfe Tones performing in Bayshore, New York, on 13 March 2010. From left to right: Brian Warfield, Noel Nagle and Tommy Byrne
- Studio albums: 16
- Extended plays: 3
- Live albums: 3
- Compilation albums: 10
- Singles: 34

The discography of The Wolfe Tones, an Irish folk and rebel group from the suburbs of Dublin, consists of sixteen studio albums, three extended plays, three live albums and ten compilation albums. The Wolfe Tones released their first album with Fontana Records in 1965 and released their most recent studio album with Shanachie Records in 2004. In the interim, the band has also released albums with Dolphin Records, Triskel Records and MCA.

During over fifty years of producing music, the Wolfe Tones have enjoyed substantial success in Ireland and the United States, where they continue to tour annually. Their most famous song is "A Nation Once Again", which was voted the number one song of all time by a 2002 BBC World Service vote. The Wolfe Tones are also well known for "Celtic Symphony", a 1987 musical tribute to the centennial of Celtic Football Club, and "Joe McDonnell", a song that chronicled the 1981 Hunger Strike in Northern Ireland.

In early 2020 their single Come Out, Ye Black and Tans regained prominence in the Official Charts of Ireland and the UK, due to political controversy surrounding a planned commemoration of the Royal Irish Constabulary.

== Albums ==
=== Studio albums ===
Year	Album Details	Peak Chart Position Ireland
1965	The Foggy Dew; Format: LP; Label: Fontana Records	—
1966	Up the Rebels; Format: LP, CD; Label: Fontana Records	—
1968	The Rights of Man; Format: LP; Label: Fontana Records	—
1970	Rifles of the I.R.A. Format: LP, CD; Label: Dolphin Records	—
1972	Let the People Sing; Format: LP, Cassette, CD; Label: Dolphin Records	—
1974	'Till Ireland a Nation; Format: LP, CD; Label: Dolphin Records	—
1976	Irish to the Core; Format: LP, CD; Label: Triskel Records	—
1976	Across the Broad Atlantic; Format: LP, Cassette, CD; Label: Triskel Records	—
1978	Belt of the Celts; Format: LP, Cassette, CD; Label: Triskel Records	—
1981	Spirit of the Nation; Format: LP, Cassette, CD; Label: Triskel Records	—
1982	As Gaeilge; Format: LP, CD; Label: Triskel Records	—
1983	A Sense of Freedom; Format: LP, CD; Label: Triskel Records	—
1985	Profile; Format: LP, Cassette, CD; Label: MCA	—
1987	Sing Out for Ireland; Format: LP, Cassette, CD; Label: Triskel Records	—
1989	25th Anniversary; Format: LP, Cassette, CD; Label: Shanachie Records	—
2001	You'll Never Beat the Irish; Format: CD; Label: Celtic Collections	—
2004	The Troubles; Format: CD; Label: Celtic Collections	41
2011	Child of Destiny; Format: CD; Label: Dolphin Records	—
2016	The Dublin Rebellion 1916; Format: CD; Label: Rebel Records	—

=== Live albums ===
Year	Album Details	Peak Chart Position Ireland
1980	Live Alive-Oh! Format: LP, Cassette, CD; Label: Triskel Records	—
2002	The Very Best of Wolfe Tones Live; Format: CD; Label: Celtic Collections	20
2004	At Their Very Best Live; Format: CD; Label: Celtic Collections	—

=== Compilation albums ===
Year	Album Details	Peak Chart Position Ireland
1971	Teddy Bear's Head; Format: LP, Cassette, CD; Label: Dolphin Records	—
1986	Greatest Hits; Format: LP, CD; Label: K-tel Records	—
2002	20 Golden Irish Ballads Volume One; Format: CD; Label: Dolphin Records	—
2002	20 Golden Irish Ballads Volume Two; Format: CD; Label: Dolphin Records	—
2003	Millennium Celebration Album; Format: CD; Label: Celtic Collections	—
2004	Rebels & Heroes; Format: CD; Label: Celtic Collections	7
2005	Celtic Symphony; Format: CD; Label: Celtic Collections	—
2006	1916 Remembered: The Easter Rising; Format: CD; Label: Celtic Collections	—
2008	The Anthology of Irish Song; Format: CD; Label: Celtic Collections	20
2013	The Platinum Collection; Format: CD; Label: EMI	35
2025	The Wolfe Tones ‘Gold’ Format: LP, CD; Label: Celtic Collections	—

=== Extended plays ===
Year	Album Details	Peak Chart Position Ireland
1967	The Teddy Bear's Head; Format: EP; Label: Fontana Records	—
1988	I Love the Wolfe Tones; Format: EP, Cassette; Label: Triskel Records	—
1988	Christmas with the Wolfe Tones; Format: EP; Label: Triskel Records	—

== Singles ==
Year	Title	Peak Chart Position Ireland	Peak Chart Position Scotland
1965	Side A: Spanish Lady; Side B: Down the Mines	—	—
1966	Side A: The Man from Mullingar; Side B: Down by the Liffey Side	—	—
1967	Side A: This Town is Not Our Own; Side B: Come to the Bower	—	—
1967	Side A: Banks of the Ohio; Side B: The Gay Galtee Mountains	—	—
1967	Side A: James Connolly; Side B: Hairy Eggs and Bacon	15	—
1969	Side A: God Save Ireland; Side B: Uncle Nobby's Steamboat	—	—
1970	Side A: Slievenamon; Side B: Seven Old Ladies	14	—
1970	Side A: Big Strong Man; Side B: The Four Seasons	—	—
1971	Side A: Fiddlers Green; Side B: Kevin Barry	—	—
1972	Side A: The Snowy-Breasted Pearl; Side B: Big Strong Man	7	—
1972	Side A: On the One Road; Side B: Long Kesh	20	—
1972	Side A: Highland Paddy; Side B: Give Me Your Hand	19	—
1973	Side A: Ireland Over All; Side B: Gloria or Glorieh	—	—
1973	Side A: The Helicopter Song; Side B: The Broad Black Brimmer	1	—
1974	Michael Gaghan	18	—
1975	Side A: Rock on Rockall; Side B: Deportees	17	—
1978	Side A: Botany Bay; Side B: Vale of Avoca	—	—
1979	Side A: Farewell to Dublin; Side B: Paddy's Green Shamrock Shore	—	—
1979	Side A: Padriac Pearse; Side B: Ta Na La	4	—
1979	Fourteen Men	19	—
1980	Side A: The Lough Sheelin Eviction; Side B: Si Beag, Si Mor	—	—
1980	Side A: Ms. Fogarty's Christmas Cake; Side B: The Wren	—	—
1981	Side A: Streets of New York; Side B: The Connaught Rangers	1	—
1982	Side A: Admiral William Brown; Side B: Cait Ni Dhuibhir	4	—
1983	Farewell to Dublin	11	—
1983	Side A: Irish Eyes; Side B: Joe McDonnell	3	—
1983	Side A: Merman; Side B: The Piper that Played Before Moses	21	—
1983	Side A: Janey Mac, I'm Nearly Forty; Side B: The Flower of Scotland	16	—
1984	Side A: Song for Liberty; Side B: Slainte Don A Baird	2	—
1985	Side A: My Heart is in Ireland; Side B: Michael Collins	—	—
1985	Side A: My Heart is in Ireland; Side B: Toor A Loo	2	—
1986	Side A: Dreams of Home; Side B: Far Away in Australia	6	—
1986	Side A: Remember Me at Christmas; Side B: Uncle Nobby's Steamboat	7	—
1987	Side A: Flight of the Earls; Side B: St. Patrick's Day	1	—
1988	Flow Liffey Water	6	—
1989	Celtic Symphony	14	—
1990	Ireland's World Cup Symphony	12	—
2002	You'll Never Beat the Irish	19	—
2003	A Nation Once Again	15	—
2020	Come Out, Ye Black and Tans	—	1
2024	Goodbye to All Our Friends	-	—
