= 'Till Ireland a Nation =

Studio album by the Wolfe Tones
- Released: 1974
- Genre: Irish folk
- Length: 48:57
- Label: Dolphin Records
- Producer: The Wolfe Tones

The Wolfe Tones chronology
Let The People Sing (1972)	'Till Ireland a Nation (1974)	Irish to the Core (1976)

Professional ratings
Review scores
Source	Rating
AllMusic	(Not Rated)

'Till Ireland a Nation is the sixth studio album by the Irish folk and rebel band the Wolfe Tones. The album features a number of political songs including The Boys of the Old Brigade and Broad Black Brimmer

== Track listing ==
1. Highland Paddy - 3:32
2. Traveling Doctor's Shop - 3:15
3. My Green Valleys - 3:34
4. The Boys of the Old Brigade - 2:58
5. Children of Fear - 4:28
6. The Boys of Fair Hill - 1:39
7. The Bodenstown Churchyard - 3:56
8. The Grandfather - 3:30
9. The Blackbird of Sweet Avondale - 3:54
10. Broad Black Brimmer - 2:38
11. Laugh and the World Laughs with You - 3:23
12. A Soldier's Life - 2:17
13. Give Me Your Hand - 3:12
14. Must Ireland Divided Be - 3:53
15. Ireland Over All - 2:42

== Personnel ==
The Wolfe Tones

- Tommy Byrne - lead vocals, guitars
- Brian Warfield - banjo, rhythm guitar, tin whistle
- Noel Nagle - tin whistle, bagpipes
- Derek Warfield - mandolin, backing vocals

Additional personnel

- Pat Keohan - bass guitar
