= Warfield (disambiguation) =

Warfield is a village in the English county of Berkshire.

Warfield may also refer to:

== Places ==
- Warfield, British Columbia, Canada, a village
- Warfield, Kentucky, United States, a small city
- Warfield, Virginia, United States, a census designated place
- The Warfield, a music venue in San Francisco, California

== People ==
- Benjamin Breckinridge Warfield, American theologian
- Wallis Simpson (Bessie Wallis Warfield), Duchess of Windsor
- Brian Warfield, Irish musician in the band Wolfe Tones
- Catherine Anne Warfield, American author
- David Warfield, American actor
- Derek Warfield, Irish musician in the band Wolfe Tones
- Edwin Warfield, former governor of the State of Maryland
- Eric Warfield, American football player
- Ethelbert Dudley Warfield (1861–1936), American historian and academic administrator
- Fintan Warfield, Irish Sinn Féin politician
- Frank Warfield, American baseball player
- Freda Warfield, American Democratic Party politician
- Henry Ridgely Warfield, 19th-century U.S. Federalist Party politician
- John N. Warfield, American systems scientist
- Justin Warfield, American musician
- Marlene Warfield, American actress
- Marsha Warfield, American actress
- Paul Warfield, American football player
- S. Davies Warfield, American bank president and railroad magnate
- William Warfield, American singer and stage performer

== Other ==
- President Warfield, original name of the passenger liner SS Exodus
- Warfield Lectures
- Battlefield or battleground
