= The Shores of Botany Bay =

Traditional Irish song

"The Shores of Botany Bay", also known as "Botany Bay" and "(The) Good Ship Ragamuffin", is regarded as a traditional Irish folk song that narrates the story of an Irish bricklayer contemplating emigration to Botany Bay in Sydney, Australia in pursuit of better opportunities. The song gained popularity in Australia, reflecting the experiences of Irish immigrants during the mid-19th-century gold rushes. It has been widely performed and recorded by various artists, cementing its place in both Irish and Australian folk music traditions.

However, given the always-volatile London unskilled Bricklaying labour market and local hostility to the place of the Irish (and specifically bricklayers and their families) in it, combined with the Long UK Economic Downturn of 1873-1896, triggered by the US Financial Panic of 1873, it is probable this jolly-sounding song was written between 1873 and 1895, possibly by someone in London to encourage more Irish to Emigrate or by a Sydney-sider Australian descendant of gold-rush era Irish parents.

== History ==
Probably (although without the exact lyrics not definitive) the song first cited in print sung as "The Good Ship Ragamuffin" in a Mt. Gambier South Australian newspaper in 1895. Due to it mentioning an “..eight hour shift…”, it must have been written after 1873, as this was when that Victorian Colonial Government work Contract Standard was passed into law.

The earliest known version of The Shores of Botany Bay was collected by Australian folklorist John Meredith from the singer Duke Tritton in the mid 20th century. Tritton recalled learning this song while busking in Sydney, but did not claim authorship. However, he states that he had written the final verse, which was later published in Volume 6, Issue 2 of the Bush Music Club's magazine Singabout in 1967. Meredith featured The Shores of Botany Bay in his publication Folk Songs of Australia and the Men and Women Who Sang Them in 1967.

== Recordings ==
"The Shores of Botany Bay" has been recorded many times by a variety of artists, including:

- The Irish Rovers on the album Come Fill Up Your Glasses
- The Wolfe Tones on the album Irish to the Core
- The Dublin City Ramblers on the album Flight of Earls
- Tommy Makem and Liam Clancy on the album In Concert
- Patrick Clifford on the album American Wake
- Blaggards on the album Standards
- Derek Warfield & The Young Wolfe Tones on the album Far Away in Australia
- The Bushwackers & Bullockies Bush Band on the album Australian Songbook 1
- Mr. Hurley & die Pulveraffen on the album Affentheater
- The Longest Johns on the collection Uncharted as part of the wider album Pieces of Eight

== Lyric Adaptation ==
- The Shores of Beaver Bay (music from Timberborn)
