= President Warfield =

President Warfield may refer to:

- S. Davies Warfield, an American banker and railroad magnate
- The passenger liner President Warfield, later renamed SS Exodus

== See also ==
- Warfield (disambiguation)
