= Come Out, Ye Black and Tans =

Irish rebel song

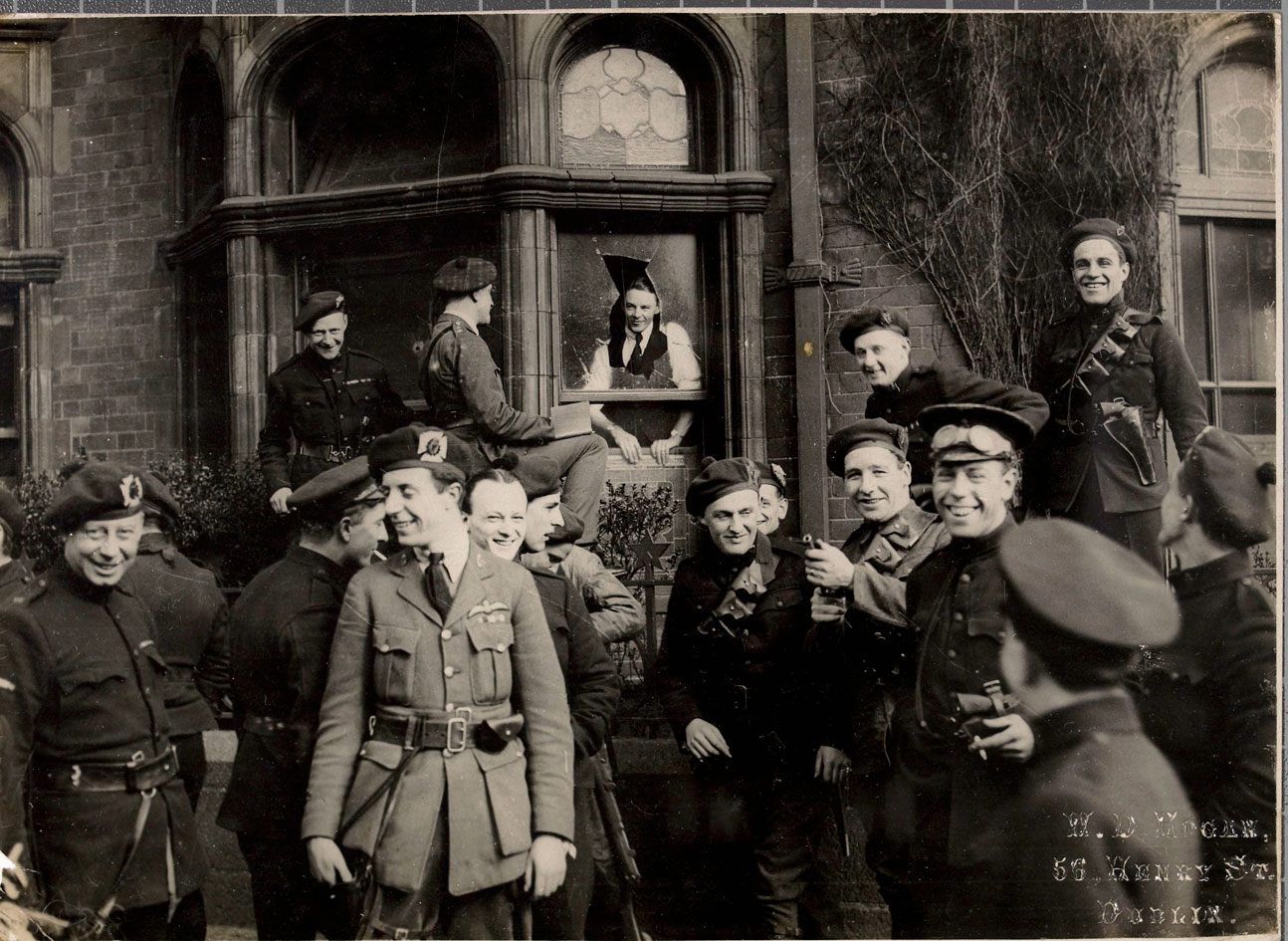
A group of Black and Tans and Auxiliaries outside the London and North Western Hotel in Dublin following an IRA attack, April 1921

"Come Out, Ye Black and Tans", also known simply as "The Black and Tans", is an Irish rebel song, written by Dominic Behan, which criticises and satirises pro-British Irishmen and the actions of the British army in its colonial wars. Its title refers to the Black and Tans, mainly former British Army soldiers, who reinforced the Royal Irish Constabulary (RIC) during the Irish War of Independence and committed many acts of violence and terror against the Irish population.

The song initially describes Behan's father Stephen Behan coming home drunk and provoking pro-British neighbours, referencing political divisions in working-class Dublin of the 1920s and 1930s. It then continues to list examples of British injustice against Ireland, linking it to colonial violence of the British Empire. The term "Black and Tans" is used pejoratively in the song to describe Irish people living in Dublin, both Catholics and Protestants, who were pro-British.

Behan composed the lyrics in the early 1960s, to the tune of the traditional song Rosc Catha na Mumhan. It was recorded in 1972 by the Irish traditional music group The Wolfe Tones, and charted in 2020. The song's melody is based on the traditional Ulster Protestant folksong The Boyne Water, which dates from the late 17th century.

== Authorship ==
The song is attributed to Irish songwriter Dominic Behan, who was born into the literary Behan family in Dublin in 1928 (his brother was Brendan Behan). It was composed at some time in the early 1960s. The setting of the song is the Dublin into which Behan was born in the late 1920s, and the main character in the song (who is calling his neighbours "Black and Tans"), is believed to be Behan's father, Stephen Behan, who was a prominent Irish republican, and who had fought in the Irish War of Independence and the Irish Civil War. At times, the song's authorship has been mistakenly attributed to Stephen Behan.

== Melody ==
The melody of the song was adapted by Behan from an old air, Rosc Catha na Mumhan (Irish for "Battlecry of Munster"), by Piaras Mac Gearailt (Pierce FitzGerald, c. 1709 – c. 1792), which was closely associated with the Jacobite cause during the 18th century. The tune is originally from an Ulster loyalist song called The Boyne Water, from the 17th century. A variant of the tune migrated to Scotland and to the Appalachian Mountains, where it became the most common melody for the traditional folk ballad Barbara Allen.

== Lyrics ==
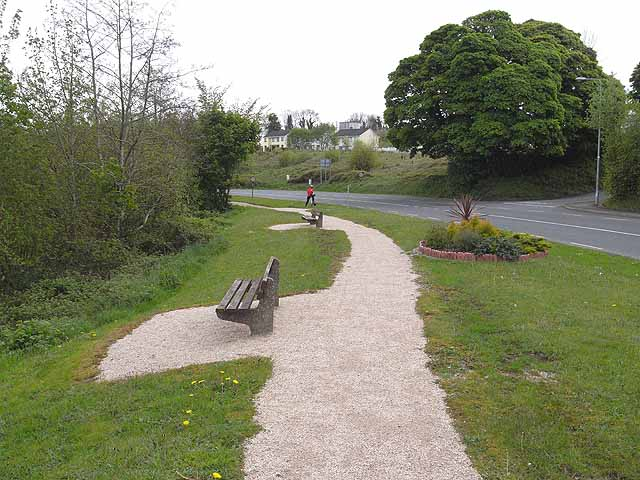
A green area of Killeshandra

While the song title and lyrics refer to the Black and Tans from the War of Independence, the Black and Tans themselves do not figure prominently in the lyrics. Instead, the song initially relates a dispute between republican and unionist neighbours in inner-city Dublin in the Irish Free State era of the 1920s and 1930s. During this era, Dublin continued to elect unionist pro-British politicians and voluntary service in the British Army was a popular career choice amongst working-class Dubliners, for both Catholics and Protestants. Supporting this tradition was the existence of a relatively large, and now generally forgotten and disappeared, Dublin Protestant working class. It is this pro-British working class, of both religions, that the composer is confronting in the song (a noted representation of this cultural group is Bessie Burgess in the Seán O'Casey play The Plough and the Stars).

In the chorus, the composer is pejoratively labelling his Dublin neighbours, who are pro-British and First World War veterans ("show your wife how you won medals down in Flanders"). He calls them "Black and Tans", and asks them to come out and "fight me like a man", stating that the "IRA" (Irish Republican Army), had made the Black and Tans "run like hell away" from rural Ireland such as the "green and lovely lanes of Killeshandra" (which is in County Cavan, and where, in 1922, ex-RIC and Black and Tan soldiers were forced to retreat from the town after being given a few days warning to leave by the local IRA).

The lyrics make references to the history of Irish nationalism, and "links the Irish experience with other peoples’ struggles against the British Empire, from the Zulus to the Middle East." One line of the song states to the Dublin neighbours: "Come tell us how you slew them poor Arabs two by two / Like the Zulus, they had spears and bows and arrows", references to the Iraqi Revolt and the Anglo-Zulu War, respectively. The lyrics reference the disdain by his neighbours (saying "sneers and jeers that you loudly let us hear"), to the execution of the leaders of the 1916 Easter Rising, and to the fall of the Irish nationalist political leader, Charles Stewart Parnell.

There are variations of the original lyrics that incorporate references to more modern events in Irish nationalism, such as the Troubles.

I was born in a Dublin street,
where the Royal drums did beat,
the loving English feet, they walked all over us,
and every single night,
when me da' would come home tight,
he'd invite the neighbours out with this chorus:

Come out ye black and tans!
Come out and fight me like a man!
Show your wife how you won medals down in Flanders!
Tell her how the IRA,
made you run like hell away,
from the green and lovely lanes of Killeshandra!

Come let us hear you tell,
How you slandered Great Parnell,
When you thought him well and truly persecuted!
Where are those sneers and jeers,
That you loudly let us hear,
When our leaders of '16 were executed!

Come out ye black and tans
Come out and fight me like a man!
Show your wife how you won medals down in Flanders!
Tell her how the IRA,
made you run like hell away,
from the green and lovely lanes of Killeshandra!

Come tell us how you slew,
Them old Arabs two by two,
Like the Zulu they had spears and bow and arrows!
How bravely you faced one,
With your sixteen-pounder gun!
And you frightened them damn natives to the marrow!

Come out ye black and tans
Come out and fight me like a man!
Show your wife how you won medals down in Flanders!
Tell her how the IRA,
made you run like hell away,
from the green and lovely lanes of Killeshandra!

The time is coming fast,
And I think them days are here,
When each seánín, he'll run before us
And if there'll be a need,
Then our kids will say "Godspeed!"
With a verse or two of singing this fine chorus:

Come out ye black and tans
Come out and fight me like a man!
Show your wife how you won medals down in Flanders!
Tell her how the IRA,
made you run like hell away,
from the green and lovely lanes of Killeshandra!

== Recordings ==
=== Wolfe Tones ===
The most notable recording of the song was by the Irish traditional group, the Wolfe Tones, who recorded the song on their 1972 album, Let the People Sing, and which credited the writing of the song to D. Behan. The Wolfe Tones version of the song recharted in 2019–2020 (see below), and the group posted on their Twitter account that the proceeds from the re-charting would be donated to an Irish homeless charity run by Peter McVerry.

== 21st-century use ==
=== Celtic Football Club ===
In an article about the violence and bigotry surrounding Old Firm football matches, the Irish Independent wrote: "Then there's the stereotypical image of the Celtic supporters wearing T-shirts of 'undefeated army' and having their phones ringing to the sound of 'Come out ye black and tans'".

=== Advertising campaigns ===
In March 2019, Irish food company Brady Family Ham released an advertising video that went viral, which used the tune of the song but with amended lyrics, and replacing the word "Tan" with "Ham", that was directed by Father Ted director Declan Lowney.

=== This Time with Alan Partridge (2019) ===
In March 2019, episode four of Steve Coogan's This Time with Alan Partridge, ended with a rendition of "Come Out, Ye Black and Tans" by Coogan, acting in-character as the fictional Irish farmer Martin Brennan. The Guardian reported that: "Irish Twitter went wild and the Wolfe Tones’ rendition of the song started to penetrate foreign consciousness on easily the biggest scale since Behan apparently put pen to paper". RTE News called it "the TV moment of the year".

=== RIC commemoration (2020) ===
In January 2020, the Wolfe Tones' version of "Come Out Ye Black and Tans" reached No. 1 on the Ireland and UK iTunes charts, as part of "widespread criticism" of the (Irish) Government's planned commemoration of the RIC, as part of its "Decade of Commemoration" (commemorating the events of 1912–1922 in Ireland). As a result of this, on 10 January, the song entered the Irish Singles Chart at No. 33, and also debuted at No. 1 in the Scottish Singles Chart, which only counts paid-for sales and does not include streaming. The band committed to donating the proceeds of this recent success to a Dublin-based homeless charity.

=== 2020 Irish general election ===
The song was used on occasions by Irish political party Sinn Féin, during the 2020 Irish general election, and was listed in the "10 defining moments" of the election by the Irish Independent. An adapted version of the song was also used by the Independent TD for Kerry, Michael Healy-Rae, as a campaign song.

== Charts ==
The Wolfe Tones version

Chart (2020)	Peak position
Australia Digital Tracks (ARIA)	19
Ireland (IRMA)	29
Scottish Singles Sales (Official Charts)	1
