= Rifles of the I.R.A. (song) =

Song
- Language: English
- Released: 1968
- Genre: Irish folk
- Songwriter: Dominic Behan

"Rifles of the I.R.A." is an Irish folk song associated with the Irish War of Independence and the Irish Civil War. The song references several Irish historical events, including the execution of Irish republican Kevin Barry, the Easter Rising and the Burning of Cork.

== Recordings ==
Artists and groups who have recorded the song include:

- Dominic Behan, original composer
- The Wolfe Tones, on their 1970 album Rifles of the I.R.A.
