= The Shores of Amerikay =

Traditional Irish song

"The Shores of Amerikay", also known as "The Shores of America", is a traditional Irish song. The song's narrator is emigrating from Ireland to America, and the song is both a meditation on this and a statement of purpose.

Some versions have Australia and not America as the emigrant's destination.

The song is played in the John F. Kennedy Presidential Library and Museum's exhibit on Kennedy's Trip to Ireland.

== Recordings ==
"The Shores of Amerikay" has been recorded by a variety of artists, including:

- The Wolfe Tones on their 1976 album Across the Broad Atlantic [3]
- The Mudmen on their 2012 album "Donegal Danny"
- The Broadsiders
- James Galway
- Johnny McEvoy
- Patrick Clifford on the album American Wake
