= The Troubles (album) =

Studio album by The Wolfe Tones
- Released: 2004
- Genre: Irish folk
- Label: Celtic Collections

The Wolfe Tones chronology
You'll Never Beat the Irish (2001)	The Troubles (2004)	Child of Destiny (2011)

The Troubles is the seventeenth album by Irish folk and rebel band The Wolfe Tones. The album's title and songs are related to The Troubles in Northern Ireland.

The album contains some well-known Irish rebel songs:

- The Patriot Game - A song originally written by Dominic Behan about Fergal O'Hanlon and a tragic incident that occurred during an attack on an RUC barracks near Brookeborough, County Fermanagh, on the 1st January 1957 during the IRA's Border Campaign. He died alongside Sean South during the attack.
- Sunday Bloody Sunday - a cover of the John Lennon song with some additions. It is about Bloody Sunday 1972, where 13 unarmed civil rights demonstrators were killed (with another dying later from injuries) by British paratroopers in Derry.
- The Men Behind the Wire - A song originally written by Barleycorn that details the pre-dawn raids during internment in Northern Ireland during the troubles.
- Long Kesh (also known as 'the H-Block Song') - A song originally written by Francie Brolly that details the introduction of internment without trial in Northern Ireland in 1971 and the brutality faced by prisoners imprisoned in The Maze (also known as Long Kesh).
- Joe McDonnell - A song about the life of the well-known Provisional IRA member who died during the 1981 Hunger Strike in Long Kesh.

== Track listing ==
Disc One

1. This is the Day
2. The Patriot Game
3. The Song of Partition
4. Children of Fear
5. Sunday Bloody Sunday
6. Plastic Bullets
7. The Men Behind the Wire
8. Lough Sheelin Eviction
9. Go on home, British soldiers
10. Danny Boy
11. Star of the County Down
12. In Belfast
13. Up the Border
14. The Green Glens of Antrim
15. The Old Orange Flute
16. The Old Brigade (Dance Medley)

Disc Two

1. Lament for the Lost
2. We Shall Overcome
3. You'll Never Beat the Irish, Part 3
4. Tyrone
5. Must Ireland Divided Be
6. Song of Liberty
7. The Orange and the Green
8. Long Kesh
9. The Sash My Father Wore
10. Fermanagh Love Song
11. Hills of Glenswilly
12. Joe McDonnell
13. County of Armagh
14. Guildford Four
15. Billy Reid
16. Up the Rebels (Dance Mix)
