= My Brudda Sylvest =

1908 popular song

Song
- Language: English (Italian-American dialect)
- Released: 1908
- Label: Edison Records
- Composer: Fred Fisher
- Lyricist: Jesse L. Lasky

"My Brudda Sylvest"
Performed by Arthur Collins & Byron G. Harlan for Edison Records in 1908

"My Brudda Sylvest", also published as "My Brudda Sylvest'" (i.e., with an apostrophe at the end), and also known as "Big Strong Man", is an American song which is often performed by English and Irish folk musicians.

== History ==
"My Brudda Sylvest" was written in 1908, words by Jesse L. Lasky, music by Fred Fisher. A 1957 obituary for Sam Stern stated that he had written "Great Big Brudda Sylvest".

The song is written in an Italian-American dialect about the singer's eponymous brother, described in hyperbolic terms as a man of legendary strength capable of extraordinary feats. The original lyric has him blowing out a house fire, pushing the ocean away to allow him to walk to Italy, killing fifty thousand Indians and drinking the ocean dry.

A 1955 version of the sheet music states that it is "sung by Sam Stern" and "Dedicated to my friend Sam Dody", and stating "Words by Jesse Lasky and Sam Stern".

Subsequent versions changed the references from the boxer John L. Sullivan to the "Jeffries–Johnson fight" of 1910, to American boxer Jack Dempsey, who started boxing in 1914, and even to John Conteh of Great Britain, who fought in the 1970s. Other changes have included the saving of the RMS Lusitania, sunk during the first World War, and swimming from New York to Italy, drinking all the water in the sea, playing every instrument in a brass band in a visit to Japan.

The song was popular with Canadian soldiers in World War II.

My Brudda Sylvest' has been popular in the North of England, having been performed by Mike Harding, The Houghton Weavers, Fivepenny Piece, Gary and Vera Aspey, and other Lancashire folk singers. Lancashire comedians such as Little and Large have also performed it.

The song is also known as Big Strong Man, sung under that name by the Wolfe Tones.

Sylvester McCoy took his stage name from the song after hearing the Wolfe Tones version.

== Recordings ==
Artists and groups who have recorded the song include:

- Arthur Collins & Byron G. Harlan, recorded in October 1908
- The Wolfe Tones, on their 1969 album Rifles of the I.R.A.
- Mike Harding, as a 1976 single
- Houghton Weavers, on their 1978 Album Sit Thi Deawn
- Orthodox Celts, on their 1996 album Muzičke paralele
- Brobdingnagian Bards, on their 2002 album Songs of Ireland
- Carbon Leaf, on their 2003 album 5 Alive!
- Derek Warfield, on his 2005 album Songs for the Bhoys
- Blaggards, on their 2005 album Standards
