= Paddy McGuigan =

Irish traditional musician (1939–2014)

Patrick Joseph McGuigan (8 December 1939 – 17 March 2014), known as Paddy Joe McGuigan, was an Irish traditional musician and songwriter who played for some years with The Barleycorn folk group. He wrote a number of well-known Irish rebel songs, including "The Men Behind the Wire", "The Boys of the Old Brigade", "Irish Soldier Laddie", "Freedom Walk" and "Bring Them Home".

== Biography ==
Born in Belfast, McGuigan was the son of John and Josephine McGuigan and grew up in a musically influenced household. His neighbours, the McPeake family, were renowned traditional musicians, helping to shape his early musical career. McGuigan was an accomplished harmonica player, even being crowned the best in Europe during his teens, and also played the guitar.

McGuigan entered music when he toured with Bridie Gallagher's backing band and began working as a session musician, honing his songwriting and arranging skills. In 1971, McGuigan founded the folk group the Barleycorn, described as one of the most professional groups on the 1970s ballad and folk circuit in Ireland. The group's first recording was The Men Behind the Wire, which McGuigan wrote in the aftermath of internment in Northern Ireland. The song describes police raids in Northern Ireland by British security forces during the Troubles, while the "men behind the wire" refers to those interned without trial at HM Prison Maze (known as "Long Kesh"), HM Prison Magilligan and onboard HMS Maidstone. McGuigan himself was arrested and interned for three months after writing the song.

McGuigan released his only solo album with Dolphin Records (DOLM 5012) in 1975, My Country, My Songs and Me. Along with Dermot O'Brien, he also produced the album, The Price Of Justice, featuring Kathleen Largey of the Flying Column Music Group.

After relocating to Dublin in the mid-1970s, McGuigan worked as a composer and arranger for RTÉ and BBC radio programmes. He released his only solo album, My Country, My Songs and Me, in 1975. He continued to contribute to Irish folk music throughout his life. McGuigan died on 17 March 2014 following a short illness, leaving behind his wife Cecilia, daughter Áine, son-in-law Robert and grandchildren Murron and Cara.
