= Fintan Warfield =

Irish former politician (born 1992)

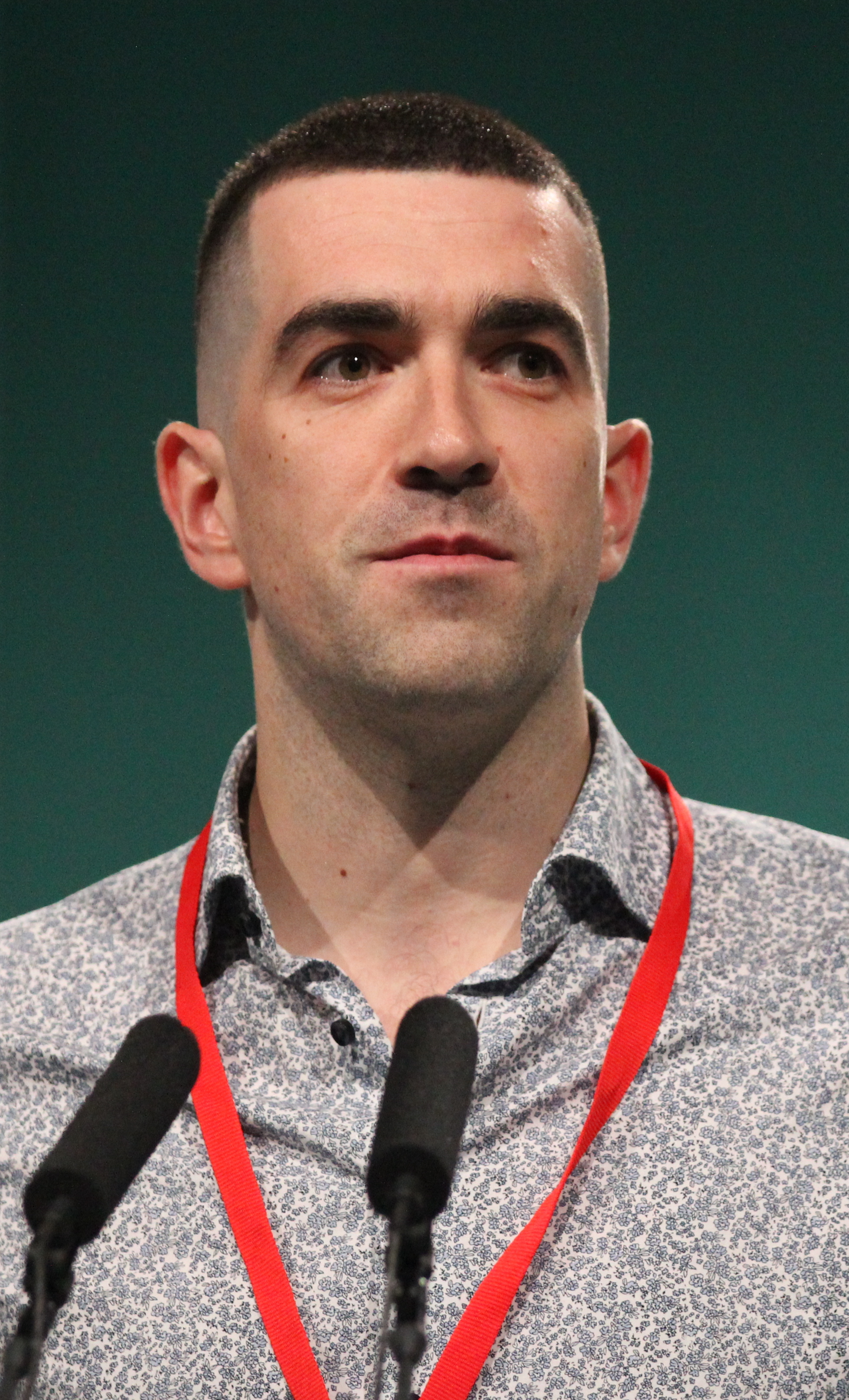
- Warfield in 2023

Senator
- In office 8 June 2016 – 30 January 2025
- Constituency: Cultural and Educational Panel

Personal details
- Born: 1992 (age 33–34) Harold's Cross, Dublin, Ireland
- Party: Sinn Féin
- Education: GMIT
- Website: fintanwarfield.com

Fintan Warfield (born 1992) is an Irish former Sinn Féin politician who served as a senator for the Cultural and Educational Panel from April 2016 to January 2025.

== Early life and education ==
Warfield attended St Mac Dara's Community College. He was a Gaelic footballer for St Jude's, a sport he has also played with Dublin Devils F.C., as well as being a supporter of St Patrick's Athletic. At 17, Warfield moved to Galway where he graduated with a Bachelor of Arts in Film & Television from Galway-Mayo Institute of Technology (GMIT) in 2012. He moved back to Dublin upon graduation.

== Career ==
Warfield was the Mayor of South Dublin County Council from 2014 to 2015, and is an openly gay LGBT activist. He donated 10% of his mayoral salary to a women's refuge, LGBT group BeLonG To and Citywise (known for providing youths with educational support in Jobstown).

Warfield was the first senator elected in the 2016 Seanad election, topping the poll on the Cultural and Educational Panel on 25 April 2016. He also won the most first preference votes of any candidate contesting the five vocational panel elections.

As a senator, he tabled two legislative bills: the Electoral (Amendment) (Voting at 16) Bill 2016, which aimed to lower the voting age to sixteen in local and European elections; and the Gender Recognition (Amendment) Bill 2017, which aimed to give gender identity rights to non-binary and transgender young people. He was the Sinn Féin Seanad spokesperson on youth affairs, LGBT rights and the arts.

On 31 March 2020, Warfield was re-elected at the 2020 Seanad election. In July 2020, Warfield made reports to the Garda Síochána following escalating online and offline homophobic harassment and abuse that started to extend to threats against members of his family. This came after he had made a speech in the Seanad in support of transgender rights, but also in the same time period as an extended bout of harassment against Green Party TD Roderic O'Gorman, who is also openly gay.

He did not contest the 2025 Seanad election, in order to pursue music full time.

== Personal life ==
A former full-time musician, he plays guitar and sings. He is a cousin of Derek Warfield and Brian Warfield (musicians with the Wolfe Tones) and performed with them, touring in the United States. He is on the board of the Civic Theatre.
