= The Men Behind the Wire =

Single by The Barleycorn

from the album Live at the Embankment
- A-side: "The Men Behind the Wire"
- Released: December 1971
- Recorded: 1971
- Genre: Protest, Republican, Rebel Song
- Label: Release Records
- Songwriter: Paddy McGuigan
- Producer: Billy McBurney

"The Men Behind the Wire" is a song written and composed by Paddy McGuigan of the Barleycorn folk group in the aftermath of Operation Demetrius. The song describes police raids in Northern Ireland by British security forces during the Troubles, and the "men behind the wire" refers to those interned without trial at HM Prison Maze, HM Prison Magilligan and onboard HMS Maidstone.

The song was recorded by the Barleycorn in Belfast (produced by Billy McBurney) and pressed in Dublin by Release Records in December 1971. After its release on 14 December the song shot into the Irish charts, selling far more copies than any other single until then released in Ireland, and remained in the charts for months. It reached No. 1 position in the Irish charts on 22 January 1972, where it remained for three weeks. After a gap of one week it returned to No. 1 for two weeks on 15 February. Royalties from the recording were donated to families of the internees.

The song was subsequently recorded by many singers and bands in Ireland and abroad, including the Wolfe Tones, Liam Clancy and the Flying Column. British singer/songwriter Dido in her song "Let's Do the Things We Normally Do" from the album Safe Trip Home used a few lines from this song. This included the lyrics "Armoured cars and tanks and guns, came to take away our sons. But every man must stand behind, the men behind the wire."

Some Ulster loyalist musicians created their own version of the song, also called "The Men Behind the Wire," using the same tune as the original republican version, however with different lyrics. A version was included on the second UVF Prisoner Aid album in 1975.

== Covers ==
- The Barleycorn Live at the Embankment Release DRL 2004 LP (1972)
- The Clancy Brothers Save the Land (1972)
- Ray McAreavy on compilation The Men Behind the Wire (R & O Records, 1972)
- The Wolfe Tones on their fifth album, Let the People Sing (1973)
- Patsy Watchorn on Irish Republican Jail Songs (re-released 2001)
- The Devil's Advocates on Snipers In Derelict Houses (1999, Triage Records)
- Steve Coogan performed a version of the song on the BBC as Irish doppelgänger Martin Brennan from Sligo on episode 4 of the television programme This Time with Alan Partridge.
- Dropkick Murphys Live at No Kings Boston (28 March 2026)
