= Rainbow Radio =

American LGBTQ radio program

Rainbow Radio is a South Carolina-based LGBTQ radio program that began airing in 2005. It has been described as South Carolina's first gay and lesbian radio show that features stories and perspectives from LGBTQ Southerners, their families, and their communities. In 2010, selected broadcasts from the program were published in the anthology Out Loud: The Best of Rainbow Radio, which later became the subject of statewide attention after being assigned as common reading at the University of South Carolina Upstate.

It airs on WXRY 99.3FM on Sundays at 8AM

== History ==
Rainbow Radio began in 2005 in Columbia, South Carolina. According to archival materials from the University of South Carolina Libraries, the program aired on WOIC-AM 1230 as an LGBTQ-focused community radio talk show.

The program featured interviews, personal stories, and discussions centered on LGBTQ life in South Carolina. Hub City Press described Rainbow Radio as a community radio program highlighting the experiences of gay and lesbian Southerners, along with their families and friends. University of South Carolina professor Ed Madden described one of the program's goals as bringing lesbian and gay voices in South Carolina into the mainstream media.

== Out Loud: The Best of Rainbow Radio ==
In 2010, selected broadcasts from Rainbow Radio were collected in the anthology Out Loud: The Best of Rainbow Radio. The book was edited by Ed Madden and Candace Chellew-Hodge, and published by Hub City Press. It includes personal stories about LGBTQ life in South Carolina and across the American South.

Out Loud: The Best of Rainbow Radio received public attention in 2014 after it was selected as a common reading for incoming students at the University of South Carolina Upstate. Following objections from several South Carolina legislators to LGBTQ-themed books assigned by public universities, lawmakes voted to reduce funding from USC Upstate and the College of Charleston. The controversy drew national media coverage and renewed discussion about academic freedom, LGBTQ representation, and common reading programs at public universities.
