= The Boys of Barr na Sráide =

Song
- Published: 1986
- Released: 1950s
- Songwriter: Sigerson Clifford

"The Boys of Barr na Sráide" is a well-known Irish song from a poem written by Irish poet Sigerson Clifford (1913–1985). It is named after a street (Irish: Barr na Sráide, meaning 'top of the street') in Cahersiveen in County Kerry, Ireland. Clifford was born in Cork city, though both his parents came from Kerry.

The song was first published in Ballads of a Bogman, 2nd edition, in 1986. However, it was well-known long before the book was published, though it did not appear in the first edition (1955).

The poem recalls the life of the author's boyhood friends starting from when they were young children through to the Black and Tan period, and up to Civil War. The poem speaks of the Irish tradition of "hunting for the wran" (wren), a small bird, on Saint Stephen's Day, 26 December.

The song was first aired on Irish radio by singer Seán Ó Síocháin on a programme called The Balladmakers Saturday Night in the 1950s. Ó Siocháin got to know Clifford through their work on the programme. The song was requested many times and became the most popular song of the series. It has since been recorded by numerous traditional and folk singers. Christy Moore popularised it in the 1970s and later it was recorded by Seán Garvey and Tim Dennehy, both from Cahersiveen.

== Recordings ==
- The Wolfe Tones - "Belt of the Celts" (1978)
- Christy Moore – Live in Dublin (1978)
- Seán Garvey – Out of the Ground (1999)
- Pauline Scanlon – Red Colour Sun (2004)
- Niamh Parsons – Live at Fylde (2005)
- Danú – Seanchas (2010)
