= You'll Never Beat the Irish =

Studio album by The Wolfe Tones
- Released: 2001
- Genre: Irish folk
- Label: Celtic Collections

The Wolfe Tones chronology
25th Anniversary (1989)	You'll Never Beat the Irish (2001)	The Troubles (2004)

You'll Never Beat the Irish is the sixteenth album by Irish folk and rebel band The Wolfe Tones. This album was the first recorded and released by the band without founding member Derek Warfield, who had departed earlier the same year.

== Track listing ==
1. You'll Never Beat the Irish, Part 1
2. The Crossing
3. The Rebel
4. In Belfast
5. Chicago
6. We are the Irish
7. United Men
8. Ireland My Ireland
9. Halloween
10. Grace
11. The Hot Asphalt
12. Thank God for America
13. Celtic Dreams
14. You'll Never Beat the Irish, Part 2
