= Come Out, Ye Black and Tans (Wolfe Tones recording) =

1972 song by The Wolfe Tones

Song by The Wolfe Tones

from the album Let the People Sing
- Released: 1972
- Genre: Irish rebel song
- Label: Dolphin Records
- Songwriter: Dominic Behan

"Come Out, Ye Black and Tans" (Note: The song is titled as "Come out Ye Black 'n' Tans" on the 25th Anniversary album re-release.) is a song recorded by Irish folk group, the Wolfe Tones. The song is a cover of the original song written by Dominic Behan. The song was featured on the group's 1972 album Let the People Sing.

== RIC & DMP commemoration ==
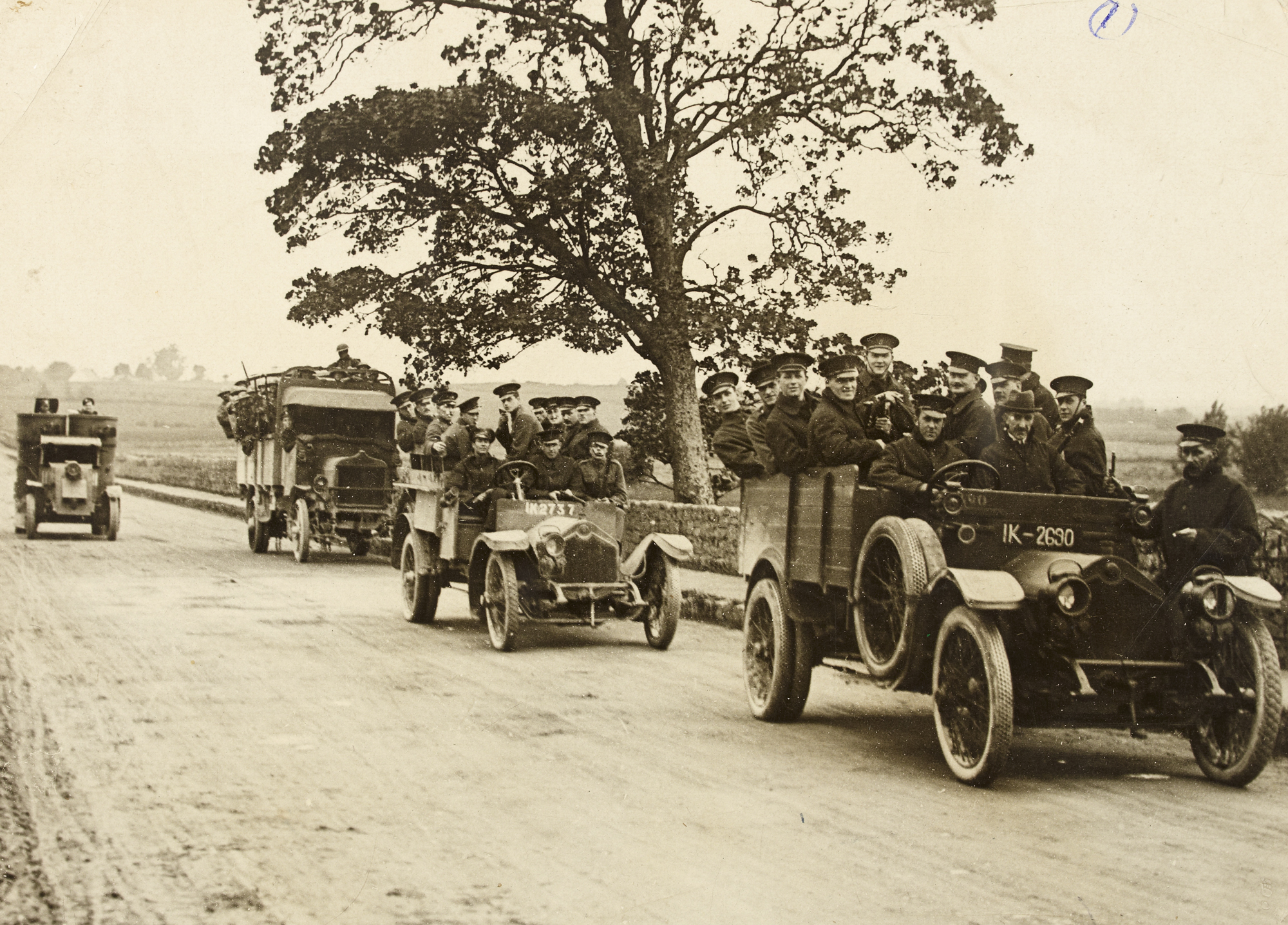
RIC and British Army personnel

In January 2020, the Irish government planned a commemoration for the Royal Irish Constabulary (RIC) and the Dublin Metropolitan Police (DMP) at Dublin Castle, which quickly led to backlash across Ireland due to the RIC's violence towards Irish civilians during the Irish War of Independence. As a way of protesting against the commemoration, people started streaming the song, due to the song being anti-RIC, with the song eventually reaching #1 on both the UK and Ireland iTunes Charts. The band donated all of the money made from digital sales to an Irish-based homeless charity, run by Peter McVerry.

== Charts ==
| Chart (2020) | Peak position |
|---|---|
| Australia Digital Tracks (ARIA) | 19 |
| Ireland (IRMA) | 29 |
| Scottish Singles Sales (Official Charts) | 1 |

== See also ==
- The Wolfe Tones discography
