= The Boyne Water =

Ulster Protestant folk song

The Battle of the Boyne, the song's subject

"The Boyne Water" is an Ulster Protestant folksong by an anonymous lyricist. The lyrics of the song commemorate King William III of Orange's victory over James II at the Battle of the Boyne in 1690, part of the Williamite War in Ireland.

== Background ==
Unionists point to the Battle of the Boyne as decisive in achieving a constitutional monarchy in the United Kingdom. Modern historians also agree that this conflict, otherwise known as the Glorious Revolution and played out in Scotland as well, was the conclusion of the English Civil War of 1642–1651 Indeed, King James II as a very young Duke of York was present with his father Charles at the Battle of Edge Hill in 1642.

The lyrics of the song narrate the course of the Battle of the Boyne. It mentions real events such as the death of the Duke of Schomberg, William of Orange's leading the Enniskillen cavalry across the River Boyne, and the Williamite infantry's repulse of the Jacobite cavalry's counter-attacks. The song also expresses the view that victory in the battle saved the Irish Protestant community from massacre by the Irish Catholics – "So praise God, all true Protestants, and I will say no further, But had the Papists gained that day, there would have been open murder". Folk memories in the 17th century, when the song was possibly written, were no doubt still very fresh concerning the various retributive massacres between Irish natives and Protestant settlers in the Irish Rebellion of 1641.

== Literary references ==
At the climactic scene of C. S. Lewis's novel That Hideous Strength, when protagonists are preparing for a dangerous fateful encounter with their enemies, the character MacPhee, an Ulster Protestant, is shown humming "The Boyne Water". Lewis gives a slightly deviant text: "King William said, be not dismayed, for the loss of one commander".

In Margaret Mitchell's Gone with the Wind, Gerald O'Hara is described as having killed a man for whistling "The Boyne Water". He had to flee Ireland to avoid prosecution for murder, and emigrated to Georgia, where in time he became a successful planter and the master of Tara.

In the Irish folksong "The Old Orange Flute" "Boyne Water" is one of the few tunes a stubbornly Protestant flute will play.

== Other songs to same tune ==
The Jacobite song "Lady Keith's Lament" is sung to the same tune. "Rosc Catha na Mumhan" ("The Battle Cry of Munster"), an Irish language song that gives the perspective of Irish Catholics warring with the settlers, uses the same tune and is attributed to Piaras Mac Gearailt (1709–92). "Rosc Catha na Mumhan" is the song that "Come Out, Ye Black and Tans", a much later Irish republican song, based its tune off of.

Many American versions of the traditional folk song "Barbara Allen" use a tune related to "The Boyne Water".

== See also ==
- Croppies Lie Down
- Lillibullero
