= Sigerson Clifford =

Irish poet, playwright & civil servant (1913-1985)

Sigerson Clifford (1913 – 1 January 1985) was an Irish poet, playwright and civil servant.

Clifford was born at 11 Dean St, Cork City, and was christened Edward Bernard Clifford. His parents, Michael Clifford and Mary Anne Sigerson, were from County Kerry, and they returned there in the following year, to Cahersiveen, in the Iveragh Peninsula. He attended the Christian Brothers school in that town.

At the age of six, he went to live with his paternal grandfather, "Ned" Clifford, on the Old Road in the town. A gifted storyteller, Ned's influence encouraged his grandson to write poems and stories while at school. As a writer, young Edward Clifford adopted the first name Sigerson in honour of his maternal family, although he continued to be known as "Eddie" to family and friends.

Aged 19, after finishing secondary school, he joined the Civil Service, and worked for several years in unemployment exchanges in Cork and Kerry. In 1943 he moved to Dublin.

== Marriage ==
In 1945 he married Sheila Marie Eady from Cork. Clifford continued to write, but he did not leave work, and retired from the Civil Service in 1973. They had two daughters and five sons, including the playwright Colm Ó Clúbhán.

== Death and legacy ==
Sigerson Clifford died in Glenageary, County Dublin, on 1 January 1985, aged 71, and was interred in Kilnavarnogue Cemetery in his native Cahersiveen, with a graveside oration by his fellow Kerry author and playwright, John B Keane. A monument to his memory stands in the centre of Cahersiveen.

Clifford wrote a number of poems and plays, including The Great Pacificator, which was staged at the Abbey Theatre, Dublin, in 1947. Clifford is best remembered for his poem, The Boys of Barr na Sráide, which was named after a street in Cahersiveen. The poem recalls the life of his boyhood friends starting from when they were young children through to the Black and Tan period, and up to the civil war. The poem speaks of the Irish tradition of "hunting for the wran" (wren), a small bird, on Saint Stephen's Day, 26 December. Later set to music, the song has been recorded by numerous traditional and folk singers including Christy Moore and Tim Dennehy.

Tim Dennehy, a singer/songwriter from the same area, wrote a song, Between the Mountains and the Sea celebrating the life and work of Clifford . It was issued on an album of the same name together with several of Clifford's songs.

On 17 July 2010, a verse of his poem The Ballad of the Tinker's Son was unveiled on a limestone plaque as part of the Puck Poets Project in Killorglin, County Kerry as a memory of his poetic contribution to the town of Killorglin.
