= Admiral William Brown =

Single by the Wolfe Tones

from the album A Sense of Freedom
- Released: 1983
- Genre: Irish folk
- Length: 4:39
- Label: Triskel Records
- Composers: Derek Warfield, Brian Warfield

The Wolfe Tones singles chronology
"Streets of New York" (1981)	"Admiral William Brown" (1983)	"Farewell to Dublin" (1983)

"Admiral William Brown" is a song written and first performed by the Wolfe Tones in 1982, the year of the Falklands War between Argentina and the United Kingdom. The song recounts the biography of Irish-Argentine admiral William Brown (1777–1857), and contains denunciations of imperialism, colonialism and the United Kingdom. It was included in the group's 1983 album, A Sense of Freedom.

The song was popular in Ireland, reaching number four in the Irish Singles Chart. In the United States, Admiral William Brown reached the top spot on WROL's "Irish Hit Parade". While the song was reportedly not released in the UK, according to the group, the controversial lyrics caused all of the Wolfe Tones's music to be banned on radio in the UK from 1983.
