= Spirit of the Nation =

Studio album by The Wolfe Tones
- Released: 1981
- Genre: Irish folk
- Label: Triskel Records

The Wolfe Tones chronology
Belt of the Celts (1978)	Spirit of the Nation (1981)	As Gaeilge (1982)

Spirit of the Nation is the tenth album by Irish folk and rebel band The Wolfe Tones. It became the band's best-selling album.

The final track, "Streets of New York" reached the top of the IRMA charts. It was written by Liam Reilly of Bagatelle and discusses Irish emigration to New York.

== Track list ==
1. Dingle Bay
2. No Irish Need Apply
3. Down by the Glenside
4. Bold Fenian Men
5. Paddle Your Own Canoe
6. Padraic Pearse
7. The Lough Sheelin Eviction
8. Song of the Celts
9. Butterfly
10. Protestant Men
11. Only Our Rivers Run Free
12. St. Patrick was a Gentleman
13. Ireland Unfree
14. Carolan's Concerto
15. Streets of New York
