= Martin Brennan (character) =

Fictional character created by Steve Coogan

Martin Brennan is a fictional character created by the English comedian Steve Coogan for the critically acclaimed 2019 television sitcom This Time with Alan Partridge, a parody of day-time British shows such as Good Morning Britain and The One Show. The show is hosted by Coogan's long-term fictional character Alan Partridge, who is a parody of a certain type of English tactless and inept television host. In the segment, Brennan is invited as Partridge's doppelganger but becomes unruly by insulting his host, gifting a tortoise (a protected species) and singing Irish rebel songs.

The sketch gained controversy in Britain when Coogan was perceived as mocking an Irish stereotype and singing two rebel songs on mainstream British television. However, the performance was very well received in Ireland, with one critic writing that because Coogan is half Irish, Brennan could have become an "offensive caricature" but instead become an overnight "social-media icon". In an interview, Coogan said that he played the role "in such a way that it would empower Martin and disempower Alan." Brennan was revived in 2022 for Coogan's touring live show, where he appeared on an overhead screen to interact and sing with Partridge.

== Sketch ==
In the skit, Partridge and his co-host Jennie (played by Susannah Fielding) interview Martin Brennan, also acted by Coogan, who had been invited onto the show as Partridge's doppelganger and is presented as a farmer from County Sligo with bad teeth, a ruddy complexion, a comb over and a heavy brogue accent.

The interview quickly becomes unruly as Brennan claims to have never heard of Partridge until a few weeks ago—he had been told that Partridge was a "famous fella, used to be on the TV way back", and says he responded to the request for an appearance by asking "Who the hell is dat". Brennan begins to sing "When You Were Sweet Sixteen", but controversially follows the rendition with segments of the Irish rebel songs "Come Out, Ye Black and Tans" and "The Men Behind the Wire", interrupting the show's planned closing montage of police dogs set to Duran Duran's "Hungry Like the Wolf". The political and incendiary lyrics of the rebel songs discomfort Partridge and the other hosts and guests. The piece ends with a visibly upset Partridge whispering to a producer into his microphone, "Oh my god, that was like an advert for the IRA. Who are we going to blame? Find out who booked them and sack her."

== Reception ==
The character has been described as the highlight of This Time and quickly became viral on social media. The nuance behind the caricature of a West of Ireland bachelor farmer was widely praised by Irish critics and fans. Writing for the Irish Sunday Independent, the critic Pat Stacey titled his review of the episode "This is what truly great, enduring comedy looks like".

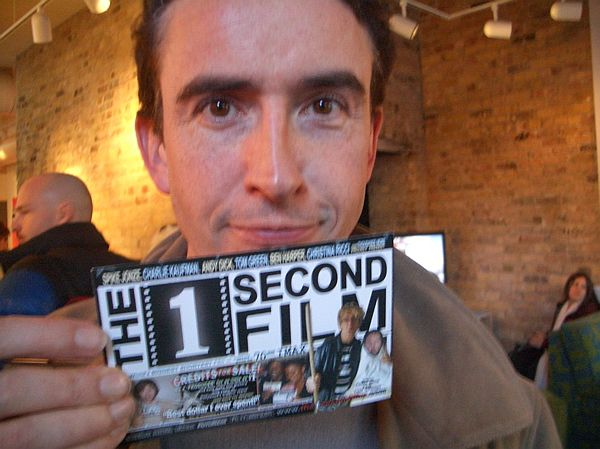
Steve Coogan in 2005

The sketch follows from a 1997 segment on "I'm Alan Partridge" where he meets with two Irish RTÉ producers, played by the Father Ted writers Arthur Matthews and Graham Linehan, where talking about Bloody Sunday, Alan confuses the event with the U2 song of the same name, saying "Sunday Bloody Sunday. What a great song. It really encapsulates the frustration of a Sunday, doesn’t it?" and remarking that "Ireland has changed from its abiding image as a land of "leprechauns, shamrock, Guinness, horses running through council estates, toothless simpletons, people with eyebrows on their cheeks, badly tarmacked drives in the UK, men in platform shoes being arrested for bombings, lots of rocks, and, uh, Beamish." He finishes by saying in a mock Irish accent that "I think people are saying, there’s more to Ireland than this. Good slogan for the tourist board. 'Dere’s more teh Oireland dan dis!'".

Coogan, who was born and raised in Manchester to Irish parents, defended the controversial aspects of the character, saying that "the decisions I make on comedy aren't made on a whim. That whole history between the British and the Irish runs through me. My mother grew up in Mayo and I spent all my summers there". In contemporary interviews he says that he grew up hearing Irishman jokes and told "a few" himself, clarifying that "all that stuff is important to me. There is a strange thing going on in Ireland with the younger people saying: this is our country." He further said that although singing Republican songs on prime time British television had been a comedic goal of his for a number of years, partly born of "mischief", he was unsure how it would be taken, and was glad when his mother (Kathleen, née Coonan) "was relieved that people thought it was great."
