= Celtic Symphony (Wolfe Tones song) =

1988 song by The Wolfe Tones

Song by The Wolfe Tones

from the album Celtic Symphony
- Released: 1987
- Genre: Irish folk
- Length: 4:41
- Label: Harmac Records
- Songwriters: Brian Warfield, Derek Warfield and John From Parkhead

Music video
- "Celtic Symphony" on YouTube

Celtic Symphony is a song by The Wolfe Tones, written in 1987 to celebrate the centenary of Celtic Football Club. It has become a staple song for Irish nationalism and Irish sports teams, which has led to controversy due to its lyrics.

== Composition ==
The song was composed to celebrate the centenary of Celtic Football Club.

== "Ooh, ahh, up the RA" ==
The songs chorus features a reference to some graffiti with the words "Ooh, ahh, up the RA"—a reference to the Irish Republican Army. Warfield said that those who are offended by the song are misguided about its intentions, and that it is a direct quote from graffiti he'd seen in Glasgow.

Celtic FC no longer associated with the band.

Fans of the Republic of Ireland national football team sing an alternate version of the phrase "Ooh, ah, Paul McGrath".

== Popularity and use ==
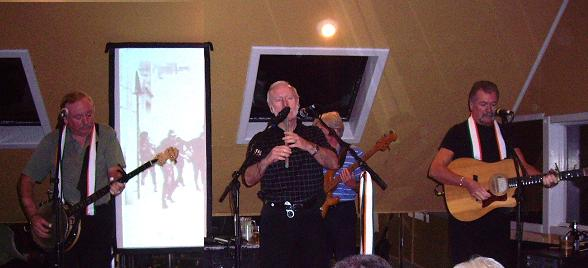
The Wolfe Tones playing at Molly Malone's in Bayshore, NY

The song is popular among Celtic supporters. Boxer Michael Conlan used the song as his entrance music, and Sinn Féin politician Pauline Tully has used the song during campaigning.

A band hired to perform at a Fine Gael party function in December 2002 played the song, and party leadership later denied involvement in the choice of band or set list.

In March 2018, boxer Michael Conlan entered for his bout in Madison Square Garden with the song playing, and some of the crowd chanted "Ooh ahh, up the RA". Some, including Northern Irish former world champion Dave McAuley, called for action from boxing regulatory bodies. Conlan subsequently apologised for his "misjudgement" in using Celtic Symphony as his ring-walk music.

The Republic of Ireland women's national football team's sang the song in the dressing room following their play-off win over Scotland in Glasgow on 11 October 2022 to qualify for the 2023 World Cup. Subsequently, the Football Association of Ireland manager Vera Pauw and players Chloe Mustaki and Áine O'Gorman apologised. Former international players Kevin Kilbane and James McClean defended the women's team. McClean had previously played the song for his West Brom teammates. Despite the apology, the song reached the top of the iTunes chart in Ireland that week.

Leinster played the song after a United Rugby Championship against Connacht on New Year's Day in 2023.
