= Child of Destiny =

Studio album by The Wolfe Tones
- Released: 2011
- Genre: Irish folk
- Label: Dolphin Records

The Wolfe Tones chronology
The Troubles (2001)	Child of Destiny (2011)	The Dublin Rebellion 1916 (2016)

Child of Destiny is the eighteenth album by Irish folk and rebel band The Wolfe Tones.

== Track list ==
1. Child of Destiny
2. Swing a Banker
3. Cliffs of Moher
4. Hibernia
5. Uncle Nobby's Steamboat
6. Siobhain
7. Anne Devlin
8. Moonbeams
9. Celtic People
10. My Green Valleys
11. John O'Brien
12. Champions of Champions
13. The Merman
14. The First of May
15. Big Brother
16. Who Fears to Speak of '98
17. Admiral William Brown
