= Song of the Celts =

Irish rebel song

Song of the Celts is a patriotic song sung by several groups, notably the Wolfe Tones, written to the tune of "Brian Boru's March". Since the lyrics of the song discuss unity amongst Irish, Scottish, Welsh, Manx, Breton and Cornish ethnic groups, it may be regarded as an unofficial anthem of the Celtic people. Some sources list the song as "traditional", however a version of the song has been attributed to A. P. Graves by author Miranda Seymour in her biography of his son, poet Robert Graves.

== Lyrics ==
There's a blossom that blows
That scoffs at the snows
And it faces root fast
The rage of the blast
And it sweetens the sod
No slave ever trod
Since mountains upreared their altar to God

CHORUS:
The flower of the free, the heather, the heather
The Bretons and the Scots and Irish together
The Manx and the Welsh and Cornish forever
Six nations are we
Proud, Celtic and free

There's a blossom that's rare
As the life's blood we share
And for liberty's cause
Against alien laws
With Lochiel and O'Neill
And Llewellyn drew steel
For Alba's and Erin's and Cambria's weal

CHORUS

Let the Saxon and Dane
Bear the rule o'er the plain
On the hem of God's robe
Is their scepter and globe
And the lord of all light
Revealed in his height
For Heaven and Earth rose up in his sight

CHORUS
