= A Nation Once Again =

Irish patriotic song

Song
- Written: 1840s
- Published: 13 July 1844
- Composers: Various, including Thomas Sherlock, Edward Comerford and James J. Johnson
- Lyricist: Thomas Osborne Davis

"A Nation Once Again" is an Irish nationalist song published in 1844 with lyrics by Thomas Osborne Davis (1814–1845). It has been set to various tunes.

== Background ==
Davis, a Protestant nationalist from County Cork, was one of the three co-founders of Young Ireland, a movement whose aim was for Ireland to gain independence from Britain.

He had a Romantic conception of Irish identity. In his view, "Ireland was a spiritual reality based on historic cultural tradition, and anyone who adopted Ireland as his homeland, regardless of his religion or when he arrived, was Irish. Davis's editorials, patriotic verse, and enthusiastic support for reviving the Irish language made him the most respected and admired of the Young Irelanders... Davis also believed strongly that Irish national identity should be secular and disapproved of what he saw as undue clerical influence on Daniel O'Connell and the repeal movement."

Davis was influenced by the ideas of Johann Gottfried von Herder (1744–1803). For Herder nationality was not genetic but the product of climate, geography, history and inclination. Davis did write of an "unsaxonised" Ireland, but this was not an Ireland ethnically cleansed of those of his own British ancestry and reformed religion. Rather it was an Ireland in which Catholic and Protestant alike, find sufficient unity and strength in their education and in their "recollections, ancestral, personal, national" to resist England's "unnatural", "cosmopolite" influence.

Davis argued that songs could have a strong emotional impact on people and, in particular, on the Irish. He wrote, "Music is the first faculty of the Irish... we will endeavour to teach the people to sing the songs of their country that they may keep alive in their minds the love of the fatherland." He wrote that, "A song is worth a thousand harangues".

== Publication of the song ==
"A Nation Once Again" was first published in Young Ireland's newspaper, The Nation, (of which Davis was a co-founder and the editor), on July 13, 1844.

The song quickly became a rallying call for the growing Irish nationalist movement of that time.

Davis' lyrics use a simple ABABCDCD rhyme scheme, with verses of eight lines, and alternating lines of iambic tetrameter and iambic trimeter.

== Lyrical themes and narrative ==
It is a prime example of an Irish rebel song. It has been variously classed as either a war song or, conversely, an anti-war song.

It features a hopeful narrative. The song's narrator dreams of a time when Ireland will be, as the title suggests, a free land, with "our fetters rent in twain". The lyrics exhort Irish people to stand up and fight for their land: "And righteous men must make our land a nation once again".

The narrator describes how he learned of ancient fighters for freedom as a boy — the three hundred Spartans who fought at the Battle of Thermopylae. The "three men" refers to the Horatii.

The narrator then declares his belief that only moral, religious men can set Ireland free, and states his own aim is to make himself worthy of such a task. Davis himself, "never tired of inculcating that the high and holy service of Ireland would be profaned by passions vain or ignoble".

== Lyrics ==
When boyhood's fire was in my blood
I read of ancient freemen,
For Greece and Rome who bravely stood,
Three hundred men and three men;
And then I prayed I yet might see
Our fetters rent in twain,
And Ireland, long a province, be
A Nation once again!

A Nation once again,
A Nation once again,
And Ireland, long a province, be
A Nation once again!

And from that time, through wildest woe,
That hope has shone a far light,
Nor could love's brightest summer glow
Outshine that solemn starlight;
It seemed to watch above my head
In forum, field and fane,
Its angel voice sang round my bed,
A Nation once again!

A Nation once again,
A Nation once again,
And Ireland, long a province, be
A Nation once again!

It whisper'd too, that freedom's ark
And service high and holy,
Would be profaned by feelings dark
And passions vain or lowly;
For, Freedom comes from God's right hand,
And needs a Godly train;
And righteous men must make our land
A Nation once again!

A Nation once again,
A Nation once again,
And Ireland, long a province, be
A Nation once again!

So, as I grew from boy to man,
I bent me to that bidding
My spirit of each selfish plan
And cruel passion ridding;
For, thus I hoped some day to aid,
Oh, can such hope be vain?
When my dear country shall be made
A Nation once again!

== Tunes ==
=== Initial melodies ===
Davis copied his melody for "A Nation Once Again" from Mozart's Clarinet Concerto.

A different melody, by an anonymous composer, accompanied the text on its first publication, which occurred in a collection called The Spirit of the Nation. This tune was unsuccessful because it was too complex.

=== Thomas Sherlock version ===
The next tune was written by Dublin-born journalist and part-time composer, Thomas Sherlock, in 1881. Sherlock "had strong Fenian sympathies and wrote for several nationalist papers – the Nation, Weekly News, Young Ireland and the Shamrock – editing the Weekly News and Young Ireland for a time... Throughout his career he retained his Fenian connections, being an active member of the Young Ireland Society in the 1880s..."

=== Edward Comerford version ===
The next version was composed by Edward Comerford (died 1894), a conductor, composer and music teacher from Dundalk.

Edward Comerford came from a nationalist family. He was the son of the Young Irelander, Patrick Comerford. Edward's brother, Matthew Comerford, was also a member of Young Ireland, serving as the treasurer of the group's Dundalk chapter. In addition, Matthew Comerford was the chairman of the local branch of the Ancient Order of Hibernians and presided over the formation of the Dundalk branch of the Irish National Volunteers. A supporter of John Redmond's push for Home Rule as opposed to militant Irish republicanism, when the Volunteers split into the moderate National Volunteers and the more bellicose Irish Volunteers, Matthew Comerford remained with the larger, more moderate group, serving as their secretary. At Easter 1916, he surrendered the National Volunteers' rifles to the British Army, rather than let them fall into the hands of the Irish Volunteers for use in the Easter Rising. For this, he was made a Member of the Order of the British Empire (MBE) in 1920 and denounced by the IRA's Seamus McGuill for his supposed "treachery".

According to the Dundalk Democrat of March 6th, 1886, the first public performance of Edward Comerford's version of A Nation Once Again had occurred on the previous Tuesday at the end of a concert conducted by Comerford in Dundalk Town Hall, held to aid the Dundalk Poor Relief Fund. Comerford changed the word "boyhood" to "childhood" in the first line "in order that it may be sung by feminine voices also". The Dundalk Democrat reported, "Mr Comerford has affected an improvement by giving a more martial air to the theme."

Comerford's sheet music was published in June 1886. The following month, the Irish Monthly described Comerford's version as "a very spirited setting" and opined that he "could not have chosen a more appropriate time" to release it.

Despite these positive reviews, ballad historian Eugene Dunphy's research suggests that no audio recording of Edward Comerford's version has ever been made. The sheet music is preserved in the National Library of Ireland's collection.

Comerford also composed the music for the song, "Sinn Féin", using the pseudonym, "A. D. F." The lyrics for this song were written by the Reverend John Sheridan, a Roman Catholic priest residing in Australia. In later life, Edward Comerford became the organist at Waterford Cathedral. In the Dundalk Democrat of August 17th, 1898, he was posthumously described as "a highly gifted musician". Likewise, in the Dundalk Democrat of November 21st, 1931, he was remembered for the "excellent service" he gave in arranging annual concerts at the Dundalk Free Library (run by his sister, Teresa Comerford).

=== James J. Johnson version ===
The final tune was written by another Dubliner, James J. Johnson, in 1887. It was an immediate success. It is the version most frequently performed today.

Johnson also composed the music for "God Save Ireland", a song "that at one time was regarded as the unofficial National anthem of Ireland by Irish Nationalists".

== Recordings ==
The song has been recorded by many Irish performers and groups, notably John McCormack in 1906, Our Lady's Choral Society in 1965, and, following on from them, The Clancy Brothers, The Dubliners, The Irish Tenors, The Kilfenora Céilí Band, The Clare Céilí Band, The Cavan Group, The Ballinamore Céilí Band, Ceoltóirí Cultúrlainne, Laichtín Naofa Céilí Band, The Alias Acoustic Band, The Diamond Accordion Band, The Eamonn Ceannt Céilí Band, The Gallowglass Céilí Band, The Turloughmore Céilí Band and The Wolfe Tones.

McCormack and The Dubliners both used the Johnson tune.

Some international acts who have recorded the song include Jerry O'Sullivan, Beltaine, Ted McGraw, Poxy Boggards and Culann's Hounds.

== Legacy ==
=== Importance in national psyche ===
From the 1880s onwards the song has become, "an unofficial anthem of nationalist Ireland".

=== Churchill's use of the phrase ===
Winston Churchill, the British prime minister, used the title phrase in an attempt to pressure Ireland to join the Allied Forces during World War II. In a telegram sent to the Éamon de Valera, the taoiseach, on 8 December 1941, Churchill wrote: "Now is your chance. Now or never. 'A nation once again'. Am very ready to meet you at any time." This has been interpreted to propose that if Ireland joined forces with Britain in the war then a united Ireland would be the reward. However, on the following day, Lord Cranborne, the Secretary of State for Dominion Affairs, informed Lord Maffey, Britain's representative to Ireland, that Churchill's use of the phrase "certainly contemplated no deal over partition" and was actually intended to mean that "by coming into the war Ireland would regain her soul". In any case, de Valera did not respond to Churchill's telegram, and Ireland maintained a position of military neutrality for the entire duration of the war.

=== In popular culture ===
In The Beatles' film, A Hard Day's Night, Paul McCartney's Irish grandfather begins singing the song to Metropolitan Police officers after they arrest him for peddling autographed pictures of the band members.

=== BBC poll ===
In 2002, after an orchestrated e-mail campaign, The Wolfe Tones' version was voted the world's most popular song in a BBC World Service global listeners' poll.
