= Belt of the Celts =

Studio album by The Wolfe Tones
- Released: 1978
- Genre: Irish folk
- Label: Triskel Records

The Wolfe Tones chronology
| Across the Broad Atlantic (1976) | Belt of the Celts (1978) | Spirit of the Nation (1981) |

Belt of the Celts is the ninth album by Irish folk and rebel band The Wolfe Tones. The album features political songs such as Some Say the Devil is Dead

== Track list ==
1. Misty Foggy Dew
2. Quare Things in Dublin
3. The Fairy Hills
4. Connaught Rangers
5. Bold Robert Emmet
6. The Hare in the Heather
7. Ta Na La
8. Some Say the Devil is Dead
9. General Munroe
10. Hurlers March
11. The West's Asleep
12. The Boys of Barr na Sraide
13. The Rose of Mooncoin
14. Rory O'Moore
