= Sing Out for Ireland =

Studio album by The Wolfe Tones
- Released: 1987
- Genre: Irish folk
- Label: Triskel Records

The Wolfe Tones chronology
Profile (1985)	Sing Out for Ireland (1987)	25th Anniversary (1989)

Sing Out for Ireland is the fourteenth album by Irish folk and rebel band The Wolfe Tones.

== Track list ==
1. Flight of Earls
2. Croppy Boy
3. The Impartial Police Force
4. Janey Mac, I'm Nearly Forty
5. Carolan's Favorite
6. The Guilford Four
7. Annabell
8. St. Patrick's Day
9. Radio Toor-I-La-Ay
10. Paddy's Night Out
11. Great Fenian Ram
12. Bonny Mary of Argyle
13. Kiss the Old Mother, Hug the Old Man
14. A Soldier's Song
