= Colm Ó Clúbhán =

Irish author and LGBT rights activist

- Born: 1954; Dublin, Ireland
- Died: March 1989 (aged 34–35)

Colm Ó Clúbhán (1954 – March 1989), also known as Colm Clifford, was an Irish playwright, author, and LGBT rights activist.

== Background ==
Ó Clúbhán was born in Dublin in 1954. His mother was Sheila Marie Eady and his father was the poet and playwright Sigerson Clifford, both from County Cork. Ó Clúbhán is the Irish form of the name Clifford. Ó Clúbhán had four brothers and two sisters. He received his primary schooling at Presentation College in Glasthule, moving to Marian College in Ballsbridge in 1968 where he spent the final four years of his secondary education.

Ó Clúbhán emigrated to London in 1973. He later moved to Barcelona, Spain, for several years to teach English before returning to London in the mid-1980s where he remained until his death.

== Career ==
Ó Clúbhán was a founding member of the London agitprop Brixton Faeries gay theatre group based in Railton Road. His poems and plays focused on queer migrants, identity, and loneliness. He won the 1986 Hennessy Literary Award for Flood. His first play, Friends of Rio Rita's took its title from the LGBT slang term Friend of Dorothy and the drag queen Rio Rita in Brendan Behan's play The Hostage who Ó Clúbhán described as “probably the only gay character I know of in Irish drama”. It was first performed at the Oval House Theatre.

Much of his work remains unpublished. His entire catalogue is held by his appointed next of kin and Literary Executors, Mary Evans Young & Derek Evans, with a small selection in the Hall–Carpenter Archives. In recent years, his work is being re-examined: Professor Ed Madden of the University of South Carolina has carried out detailed research on Ó Clúbhán's works and hosted a Boston College Ireland symposium on Ó Clúbhán in 2017. Friends of Rio Rita's was staged at The Outhouse in Dublin in November 2017. There was a reading by the Lewisham Irish LGBT Network at the Lewisham Irish Community Centre in 2018 and a full production, directed by Stephen Gee at the same venue in October 2019.

== Plays ==
- Friends of Rio Rita's - 1985
- Dermot Begley's Last Chance - 1985, radio
- Reasons for Staying - 1986
- Beyond Kansas 1986
- Fair Game 1988
- Flesh and Blood in a Well-Fed-State 1988
- A Rip in the World 1988
- The Risk (undated)
- The Body Beneath (undated)
- Southern Comfort (undated)

== Death ==
Ó Clúbhán died of AIDS-related illness at The London Lighthouse in March 1989, aged 34. There is a bench within the Walled Garden of Brockwell Park, Brixton, dedicated to his memory.
