= Croppies Lie Down =

British folk song

"Croppies Lie Down" is a British folk song, dating from the 1798 rebellion in Ireland, that celebrates the defeat of the Irish rebels. The author has been reported as George Watson-Taylor.

This song illustrates the deep divisions which existed in Ireland at the time of the 1798 rebellion. Irish Catholics, and to a lesser extent Dissenters, were legally excluded from political and economic life. The Kingdom of Great Britain was at war with revolutionary France at the time, and Irish republicans were encouraged by rumours that France would invade the island. The lyrics describe the rebels as treacherous cowards and those fighting them as brave defenders of the innocent. "Croppies" meant people with closely cropped hair, a fashion associated with the French revolutionaries, in contrast to the wigs favoured by the aristocracy. In George Borrow's 1862 travel book Wild Wales, the author comes upon an itinerant Irish fiddler and asks him to play the tune.

== Lyrics ==
"We soldiers of Erin, so proud of the name,
We'll raise on the rebels and Frenchmen our fame;
We'll fight to the last in the honest old cause,
And guard our religion, our freedom and laws;
We'll fight for our country, our King and his crown,
And make all the traitors and croppies lie down.
Down, down, croppies lie down.

The rebels so bold, when they've none to oppose,
To houses and haystacks are terrible foes;
They murder poor parsons and likewise their wives,
At the sight of a soldier they run for their lives;
Whenever we march over country and town
In ditches and cellars the croppies lie down.
Down, down, croppies lie down.

In Dublin the traitors were ready to rise
And murder was seen in their lowering eyes
With poison, the cowards, they aimed to succeed
And thousands were doomed by the assassins to bleed
But the yeoman advanced, of rebels the dread
And each croppy soon hid his dastardly head
Down, down, croppies lie down.

Should France e'er attempt, by fraud or by guile,
Her forces to land on Erin's green isle,
We'll show that they n'er can make free soldiers, slaves,
They shall only possess our green fields for their graves;
Our country's applauses our triumphs will crown,
Whilst with their French brothers the croppies lie down.
Down, down, croppies lie down.

Oh, croppies ye'd better be quiet and still
Ye shan't have your liberty, do what ye will
As long as salt water is formed in the deep
A foot on the necks of the croppy we'll keep
And drink, as in bumpers past troubles we drown,
A health to the lads that made croppies lie down
Down, down, croppies lie down."

== See also ==
- The Boyne Water
- Lillibullero
