= Ed Madden (professor) =

American poet (born 1963)

- Born: 1963 (age 62–63)

Academic work
- Institutions: University of South Carolina

Ed Madden (born 1963) is an American poet, activist, and Director of Women's and Gender Studies at the University of South Carolina. Much of his scholarship has focused on Irish queer literature and culture.

== Early and personal life ==
Madden grew up on a family farm near Newport, Arkansas, where his family attended the Church of Christ, an experience which greatly influenced Madden's later writing. He got his B.A. from nearby Harding University, and received his Ph.D. in literature from the University of Texas, Austin. Madden came to realize he was gay while attending these two schools. After coming out to his parents, they did not speak to him for nearly a decade.

Madden's life partner is Bert Easter, President of the South Carolina Gay and Lesbian Pride Movement. They live in Columbia, South Carolina, and both serve as board members for the South Carolina Gay and Lesbian Community Center, now called the Harriet Hancock Community Center. They were among the first men to file for a marriage license, and ten years after doing so for the first time, they were also among the first men legally married in the state (November 20, 2014).

== Career ==
=== Academia ===
Madden is a professor of English. He has written several critical articles on modern British and Irish poetry and has completed a book on representations of Tiresian liminality in modernist poetry (Tiresian Poetics: Modernism, Sexuality, Voice, 1888-2001 from Fairleigh Dickinson University Press). He co-edited (with Marti Lee) Irish Studies: Geographies and Genders, also co-edited an anthology of essays and poems on male experience, The Emergence of Man into the 21st Century, and wrote "An Open Letter to My Christian Friends," which appears in various textbooks, including Everything's an Argument. Madden has undertaken extensive research on the Irish writer Colm Ó Clúbhán and hosted a Boston College Ireland symposium on Ó Clúbhán in 2017.

In addition to his literary criticism, he also publishes on issues involving sexuality and spirituality. He has published "Gospels of Inversion: Literature, Scripture, Sexology" in a collection of essays entitled Divine Aporia: Postmodern Conversation About the Other (edited by John C. Hawley). Another intervention in the intersection of religion, literature, and sex came in the essay "'The Well of Loneliness', or the Gospel According to Radclyffe Hall," published in Reclaiming the Sacred: The Bible in Gay and Lesbian Culture (edited by Raymond-Jean Frontain).

=== Poetry ===
Madden has published multiple collections of poetry. His 2016 collection, Ark, is based on his 2011 return to Arkansas to care for his ailing father, who had never accepted Madden's gay identity. Much of Madden's work invokes Christian tradition and imagery, often in the context of friction between Madden's gay identity and his family's religious beliefs. Madden also frequently writes on flowers, gardening, and landscapes.

Madden served as Columbia, SC's first Poet Laureate from 2015 to 2022. During this time, Madden began to write more poetry responding to current events and political issues, including a poem written in the aftermath of the Charleston church shooting in 2015. His 2026 chapbook, I Asked Him What He Needed, contains poems written in respond to national politics, and immigration policy and ICE operations in particular.

Madden has been a South Carolina Academy of Authors fellow in poetry twice. He has been writer in residence at the Riverbanks Botanical Gardens in Columbia, South Carolina, and he also worked as writer in residence at Fort Moultrie in Charleston, South Carolina, as part of the state's African-American Heritage Corridor project. He also works with the South Carolina Poetry Initiative and was a 2006 Artist-in-Residence for the South Carolina State Parks.

=== Awards ===
Madden won not only the single-poem contest sponsored by The State newspaper (Columbia, South Carolina) and the South Carolina Poetry Initiative (with "Prodigal: Variations"), but he has also won the South Carolina Poetry Book Prize, with Signals, which was published by the University of South Carolina Press. More recently, Madden was selected as one of the top 50 New Poets by Meridian Magazine (which is published by the University of Virginia Press) for his poem, "Sacrifice," which was included in the Best New Poets of 2007 anthology.

In 2022, Madden received the Governor’s Awards for the Arts in the Individual category.

In 2025, Madden was awarded the 2025 Carolina Trustees Professorship in Humanities, Social Sciences, Business and Law "for his achievements in teaching, research and service."

== Publications ==
=== Academic books ===
- Tiresian poetics: modernism, sexuality, voice, 1888-2001. Madison (N.J.): Fairleigh Dickinson University Press. 2008. ISBN 978-0-8386-3937-5.

=== Articles ===
- "Say It with Flowers: The Poetry of Marc-André Raffalovich". College Literature. 24 (1): 11–27. 1997. ISSN 0093-3139.
- "The Well of Loneliness, or the Gospel According to Radclyffe Hall". Journal of Homosexuality. 33 (3–4): 163–186. August 28, 1997. doi:10.1300/J082v33n03_08. ISSN 0091-8369. PMID 9378937.
  - Republished in Frontain, Raymond-Jean (ed.). Reclaiming the Sacred: The Bible in Gay and Lesbian Culture.
- ""Gently, not gay": Proximity, Sexuality, and Irish Masculinity at the End of the Twentieth Century". The Canadian Journal of Irish Studies. 36 (1): 69–87. 2010. ISSN 0703-1459.
- "Queering the Irish Diaspora: David Rees and Padraig Rooney". Éire-Ireland. 47 (1–2): 172–200. March 2012. doi:10.1353/eir.2012.0008. ISSN 1550-5162.
- "Get Your Kit On: Gender, Sexuality, and Gay Rugby in Ireland". Éire-Ireland. 48 (1–2): 246–281. March 2013. doi:10.1353/eir.2013.0005. ISSN 1550-5162.
- "Queering Ireland, In the Archives". Irish University Review. 43 (1): 184–221. May 2013. doi:10.3366/iur.2013.0064. ISSN 0021-1427.

=== Chapters ===
- Hawley, John C. (ed.). "Gospels of Inversion: Literature, Scripture, Sexology". Divine Aporia: Postmodern Conversation About the Other.
- Barr, Rebecca Anne; Brady, Sean; McGaughey, Jane, eds. (2019). "Bachelor Trouble, Troubled Bachelors: The Cultural Figure of the Bachelor in Ballybunion and Mullingar". Ireland and Masculinities in History. Cham: Springer International Publishing. pp. 177–202. doi:10.1007/978-3-030-02638-7_9. ISBN 978-3-030-02638-7.

=== Poetry collections ===
- Signals (2009)
- Prodigal: Variations. 2011.
- Nest. Salmon Press. 2014.
- Ark. Sibling Rivalry Press. March 15, 2016. ISBN 978-1943977086.
- A pooka in Arkansas. The Word Works. 2023.

=== Chapbooks ===
- My Father's House. Seven Kitchens Press. 2013.
  - Runner-up for the 2011 Robin Becker Chapbook Prize
- So they can sing. Robin Becker Series. Seven Kitchens Press. 2017.
- Sebastian. ReBound Series. Seven Kitchens Press. 2021.
- Arkansas Luggage. Chaps Poetry Series. Squares & Rebels Press. 2025.
- I Asked Him What He Needed. Chaps Poetry Series. Squares & Rebels Press. February 28, 2026.

== Activism ==

Madden has been Secretary, Vice President, and President of the South Carolina Gay and Lesbian Pride Movement. He has written numerous editorials advocating gay liberation in local and national newspapers. He is also the executive producer of Rainbow Radio: The REAL Gay Agenda, a South Carolina-based, gay-themed radio talk show that is broadcast Sundays at 10 a.m. in Columbia, South Carolina on Air America, WOIC-AM 1230. This project culminated in the book Out Loud: The Best of Rainbow Radio, a collection and joint project with fellow activist Candace Chellew-Hodge. This book was chosen by the University of South Carolina's Upstate campus as a common reader for their first-year experience. This led the South Carolina House of Representatives to cut funds to that school in what some called an act of censorship.
