= Profile (Wolfe Tones album) =

Studio album by The Wolfe Tones
- Released: 1985
- Studio: Windmill Lane Studios
- Genre: Irish folk
- Label: MCA Records
- Producer: Bill Somerville-Large

The Wolfe Tones chronology
A Sense of Freedom (1983)	Profile (1985)	Sing Out for Ireland (1987)

Profile is the thirteenth album by Irish folk and rebel band The Wolfe Tones.

The album received a 3* rating from critic Stewart Mason, writing for Allmusic.

== Track list ==
1. My Heart is in Ireland
2. Wearing of the Green
3. Mullingar Feadh
4. Plastic Bullets
5. Macushla Mavourneen
6. Song of Liberty
7. Women of Ireland
8. Butcher's Apron
9. Little Jimmy Murphy
10. The Sailor St. Brendan
11. Toor a Loo Tooralay
12. Far Away in Australia
