= Irish to the Core =

Studio album by The Wolfe Tones
- Released: 1976
- Genre: Irish folk
- Label: Triskel Records

The Wolfe Tones chronology
'Till Ireland a Nation (1974)	Irish to the Core (1976)	Across the Broad Atlantic (1976)

Irish to the Core is the seventh album by Irish folk and rebel band The Wolfe Tones. The album features a number of political songs including Botany Bay and Rock on Rockall.

== Track list ==
1. Botany Bay
2. The Water is Wide
3. The Irish Brigade
4. Graine Mhaoil
5. Whelan's Frolics
6. The Night Before Larry was Stretched
7. Fiddler's Green
8. The Vale of Avoca
9. The Limerick Races
10. The Jackets Green
11. The Cook in the Kitchen and the Rambling Pitchfork
12. Kevin Barry
13. Rock on Rockall
