= Rifles of the I.R.A. =

Rifles of the I.R.A

Studio album by The Wolfe Tones
- Released: 1970
- Studio: Eamonn Andrews Studios
- Genre: Irish folk Psychedelic folk
- Label: Dolphin Records
- Producer: The Wolfe Tones

The Wolfe Tones chronology
The Rights Of Man (1968)	Rifles of the I.R.A (1970)	Let the People Sing (1972)

Professional ratings
Review scores
Source	Rating
AllMusic	3/5 stars

Rifles of the I.R.A. is the fourth album by Irish folk and rebel band The Wolfe Tones. The album title Rifles of the I.R.A. makes reference to the Irish Republican Army (IRA).

The album was the first that the band released on the Dolphin Records label. The cover shows the band members dressed in the traditional dress of the IRA. The folk singer Christy Moore said of the cover, "I equate that particular record sleeve with Foster and Allen, dressed up as leprechauns. It was the very same thing. It had the same significance at the time."

== Track list ==
1. Slievenamon
2. Erin Go Bragh
3. God Save Ireland
4. The Sun is Burning
5. Big Strong Man
6. In Garran na Bhile
7. Four Seasons
8. Rifles of the I.R.A.
9. Skibbereen
10. Sweet Carnlough Bay
11. Ships in Full Sail
12. Sean Tracy (Tipperary So Far Away)
13. Holy Ground
14. Uncle Nobby's Steamboat
