= As Gaeilge =

Studio album by The Wolfe Tones
- Released: 1982
- Genre: Irish folk
- Label: Triskel Records

The Wolfe Tones chronology
Spirit of the Nation (1981)	As Gaeilge (1982)	A Sense of Freedom (1983)

As Gaeilge is the eleventh album by Irish folk and rebel band The Wolfe Tones. The title translates as "In Irish" and the album is entirely recorded in the Irish language.

== Track list ==
1. Caoine Cill Cáis
2. Sí Finn
3. Amhrán na Breac
4. Thugamar Féin an Samhradh Linn
5. Brabazons
6. Cáit Ní Dhuibhir
7. Cuan Bhantraí
8. Rosc Catha na Mumhan
9. I nGarán na BhFile
10. Éamonn an Cnoic
11. Siún Ní Dhuibhir
12. Tá na Lá
13. Reels
14. An Dórd Feinne
