= Culann's Hounds =

American Irish folk band

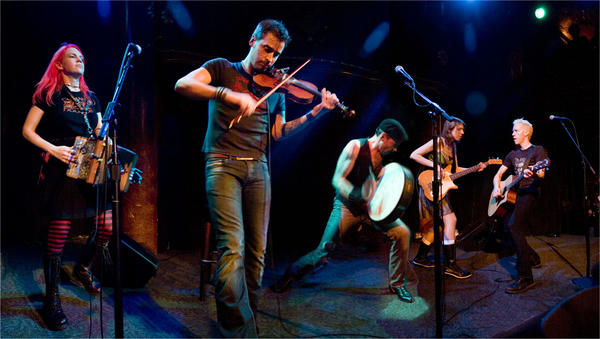
- Culann's Hounds performing in San Francisco

Background information
- Origin: San Francisco, California, United States
- Genres: Irish traditional music, indie rock
- Years active: 1999–present
- Website: www.sfhounds.com

Culann's Hounds are a traditional Irish folk band from San Francisco, California, United States. Founded in 1999 by Steve Gardner and Michael Kelleher as The Irish Bastards, the band began playing gigs and soon adopted the more broadly appealing name.

== Origins ==
The name Culann's Hounds derives from the Irish folk story of Cuchulainn, a great Irish hero chronicled in the Tain. Cuchulainn, meaning the Hound of Culann, earned his name after killing (in self-defense) a fierce guard dog owned by the blacksmith Culann. The boy repaid the smith by guarding his house until a new dog could be raised.

Culann's Hounds played their first public gig in spring of 1999 at the Blackthorn Tavern in San Francisco. Though initially sparsely attended, the up-tempo music attracted a crowd, establishing a tradition of Sunday afternoon gigs, sometimes called the Hounds' Sunday Beer Social. Culann's Hounds' popularity grew and in 2001 they recorded and released their first, eponymously titled album. Their second album, Year of the Dog, was released March 17, 2006 (St. Patrick's Day) at the Great American Music Hall. The Hounds headlined the show; Quin and the Earl Brothers opened. The Hounds have returned to headline the Great American Music hall for St. Patrick's Day each year from 2007 to the present.

The Hounds have toured in the United States and Europe, playing concerts and festivals with acts from various genres.

The Hounds are preparing material for a new album, which will feature more of their original compositions. Some of these tracks were released in 2007 (The House of Faith Session) and 2008 (One for the Road), though the latter is composed almost entirely of traditional songs.

== Members ==
Current line-up:

- Steve Gardner - Violin|Fiddle, Guitar, Mandolin, Vocals
- Michael Kelleher - Guitar, Tin whistle, Vocals
- Renée de la Prade - Button Accordion, Vocals
- Dan Duffin - Bass Guitar, Vocals
- Scott Marshall - Bodhrán, Drums & Percussion, Vocals

Past members:

- Michael Messer - Drums
- Chris Thomas - Drums
- Adam Roach - Guitar
- Caitlin Oliver-Gans - Bass
- Alan Kaufman - Vocals
- Frank Jordan, Jr. - Bodhrán, Vocals
- Conall O'Raghallaigh - Uilleann pipes
- Kevin McDonough - Tin whistle, Flute
- Eliza James - Vocals
- Tim Hill - Uilleann pipes
- Jonathon Tait - Bodhrán
- Glenn Farr - Violin|Fiddle

== Discography ==
- Culann's Hounds (2001)
1. Old Hag You've Killed Me/The Tar Road to Sligo/The Gander in the Hole
2. Lady's Fancy
3. The Maids of Mitchelstown
4. Spancil Hill
5. Banish Misfortune/O'Keefe's Slide/The Monk's Jig
6. Peggy Gordon
7. The Swallowtail Jig/Ballinasloe Fair/Cherish the Ladies
8. The Black Velvet Band
9. The Wind that Shakes the Barley/The Musical Priest/Farewell to Erin
- Year of the Dog (2006)
1. Twin Peaks
2. Dirty Old Town
3. Rainy Day
4. The Foggy Dew
5. The Skylark
6. Pelican Inn
7. Wild Mountain Thyme
8. Homeward Bound
9. Éire
10. The Carlow Set
11. The Tennessee Waltz
12. Helvic Head
- The House of Faith Session (2007)
1. Bourbon and Toulouse
2. Thousand Flowers
3. Zombie
4. Shilelagh Polka
- One for the Road (2008)
1. The Rising of the Moon
2. Irish Rover
3. The Wet Goat (Whelan's Jig/Lantern Jig/Kid on the Mountain/An Phis Fhiliuch)
4. Old Triangle
5. Whiskey in the Jar
6. Danny Boy
7. The Blackthorn Tavern (Tempest/Drag Her Around the Road/Ormond Sound/Virginia Reel)
8. Wild Rover
9. Three Drunken Polkas (I Have a Bonnet Trimmed with Blue/Little House in the Glen/Tom Billy's)
10. Star of the County Down
11. She Moved Through the Fair
12. Rocky Road to Dublin
13. Parting Glass
14. Lettuce Leaf
15. A Nation Once Again
