= A Sense of Freedom (album) =

Studio album by The Wolfe Tones
- Released: 1983
- Genre: Irish folk
- Label: Triskel Records
- Producer: Bill Sommerville-Large

The Wolfe Tones chronology
As Gaeilge (1982)	A Sense of Freedom (1983)	Profile (1985)

A Sense of Freedom is the twelfth album by Irish folk and rebel band The Wolfe Tones.

== Track listing ==
1. Merman
2. Sgt. William Bailey
3. Farewell to Dublin
4. Admiral William Brown
5. Catalpa
6. Irish Eyes
7. Flower of Scotland
8. Michael Collins
9. Slainte Dana no Baird/Cailin O Chois tSiuire Me/Planxty McGuire
10. Galtee Mountain Boy
11. The Piper that Played Before Moses
12. Let the People Sing
13. Joe McDonnell
