= Let the People Sing (album) =

Let The People Sing

Studio album by The Wolfe Tones
- Released: 1972
- Genre: Irish folk
- Label: Dolphin Records

The Wolfe Tones chronology
Rifles of the I.R.A. (1970)	Let The People Sing (1972)	'Till Ireland a Nation (1974)

Let the People Sing is the fifth album by Irish folk and rebel band The Wolfe Tones. The album features a number of political songs including Come Out Ye Black and Tans and A Nation Once Again. James Connolly is about the execution by firing squad of the socialist revolutionary after the Easter Rising of 1916, whilst Long Kesh is a song which protests IRA imprisonment at Long Kesh prison. Sean South of Garryowen honours the legacy of Irish Republican soldier Seán South, who died during an attempted raid of an RUC station in Brookesbourgh in 1957.

== Track listing ==
1. The Snowy-Breasted Pearl
2. Sean South of Garryowen
3. Twice Daily
4. James Connolly
5. Don't Stop Me Now
6. Taim in Arrears
7. Come Out Ye Black and Tans
8. On the One Road
9. The Men Behind the Wire
10. For Ireland, I'd Not Tell Her Name
11. Paddy Lie Back
12. First of May
13. Long Kesh
14. A Nation Once Again
