= Beltaine (band) =

Polish folk band

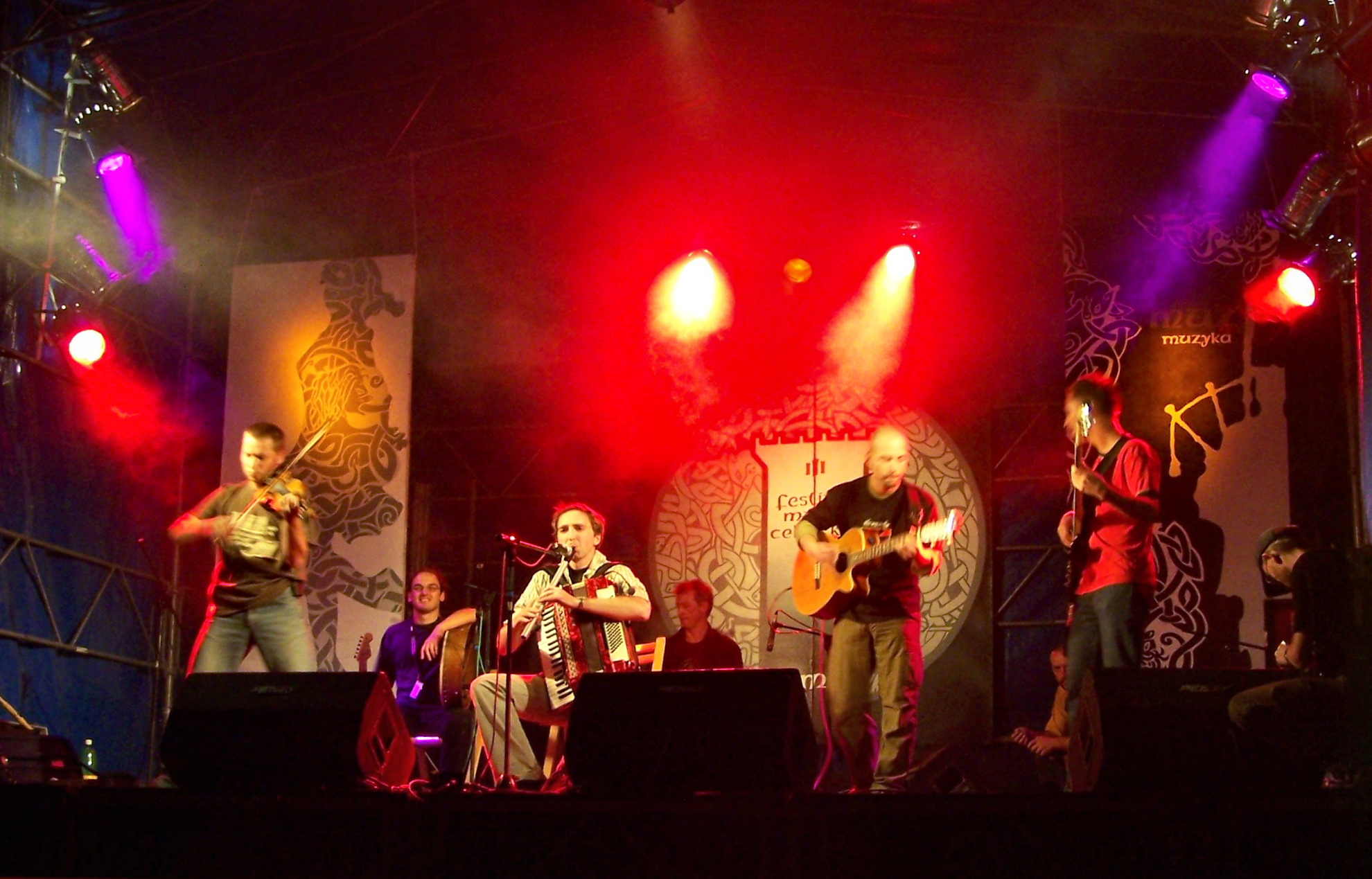
- Beltaine in Bedzin

Background information
- Origin: Katowice, Poland
- Genres: folk music
- Instruments: fiddle, acoustic guitar, bass guitar, bagpipe, flute, whistle, bodhran, mandolin, banjo, electric guitar, Irish bouzouki, percussion, tabla, cajon, djemebe, Goblet drum, conga, timbales
- Years active: 2002–present
- Members: Adam Romański; Jakub "Goldfinch" Szczygieł; Łukasz "Coolesz" Kulesza; Adam Stodolski; Jan Gałczewski; SpacePierre; Jan Kubek
- Past members: Grzegorz Chudy; Mateusz Sopata; Bartłomiej Dudek
- Website: www.beltaine.pl

Beltaine is a Polish folk band.

== Name ==
The group name is derived from a Celtic holiday celebrated on the night of April 30 and May 1. Beltaine Celtic name corresponds to the month of May. The Celts divided the year into a bright and a dark part, or a warm and a cold part, and May 1 was the start of the bright and warm part of the year. Beginning of light and warm semester for them was cause for celebration; it meant abundance and fertility. To celebrate this day on the night of April 30 to May 1 the Celts first put out the fire, and then rekindled it from scratch, which would mean the defeat of darkness and all evil forces. Those fires that they were singing by and dancing had Holy character for Celts and were kindled from nine species of wood, which must include the oak, which for the Celts was a sacred wood. The fire from the sacred fires were transferred on May 1 to homes, which was to assure a success in the new year.

== Biography ==
Beltaine was formed in 2002 in Katowice, Poland. Its first concerts were based on traditional instruments (guitar, violin, accordion, bodhran). Bass guitar and percussion were later added. The initial repertoire of the band consisted of popular Irish and Scottish folk tunes. The original team consisted of - Grzegorz Chudy, Adam Romański, Luke Kulesza, Bartlomiej Dudek, Danuta Anna Badura and Adams.

In 2003 the band began touring outside the province of Silesia. The band performer among others in Toruń and at the Celtic Culture Festival in Dowspud. Since then the group performs intensively in the whole country. In September 2003 the first Celtic Music Festival "Castle" in Bedzin was organized, that Beltaine hosts and co-organizes until now.

In 2004 the band recorded their first album "Rockhill", that was the musical illustration of a Beltaine's holyday celebrated in Ireland. Tracks consisted mostly of traditional Celtic tunes and a few original songs (such as Beltaine, The Sea of Irish Dream and Rockhill), the album also began to show musical trends of the team to combine the music of Brittany, Ireland and Scotland, with other types of music. Guest starring on the album include Jan Gałczewski, Catherine Czerniak, and known from the group Viva Flamenco guitarist Michael Czachowski. Album Rockhill was awarded the "Virtual Gesle" (Internet opinion poll co-organized by the Polish radio station) for Best Folk Album of 2004. Rockhill has also received the title of "megadisc 'Radio Krakow in the competition. This year, the group violinist Anna Badura left, whereas Jan Gałczewski joined the band permanently.

In 2005 Jan Kubek joined the ranks of the band playing percussion instrument (i.e. tabla, darabuka, conga, cajon ). Group has launched numerous concerts abroad, within 5 years their credits include Beltaine in the Czech Republic, Slovakia, Moldova, Switzerland, Lithuania, Portugal, France, Italy, Malaysia and Mexico.

Search for their own style and the possibility of expanding repertoire resulted in invitation for the cooperation with 2006 percussionist Mateusz Sopata. The team also received a proposal to contribute to the music accompanying the video game The Witcher.

The next year was marked by of recording of the KoncenTrad. The album is the brave combination of Celtic tradition and modernity. The album does not lack loud and rhythmic tracks like a Technogaita and ballads Ye Yacobites or Parcel of Rogues.The album with a guest appearance of Indian musician Giridhar “Gathamˮ Udupa, is regarded as the most rock in the band repertoire. A year later the publishing house was awarded with the subsequent The Virtual Primitive Fiddles, which became the ticket to playing the live concert in Agnieszka Osiecka’s Studio on the air of The Third Programme of Polish Radio.

Third Album –Triu was recorded in 2010. The album may be defined confidently as “fusion folk”. The works placed on the album are daring and brave marriages of elements of funk, jazz, and rock with Celtic music.

Expert listeners will also detect the influences of Slavic, Jewish, and Arabic music.

Marcin Wyrostek ( accordion ) and Dominik Mietła ( trumpet ) made a guest appearance in the record. The music from that disc largely contributed to the band being awarded an international prize Top Celtis rock band in the opinion poll organized by International Irish Music Association.

== Concerts ==
The most important concerts:

- Ollin Kan Festival (Mexico 2009)
- Rainforest World Music Festival (Malaysia 2008)
- Tom de Festa (Portugal 2008)
- Guinness Irish Festival (Switzerland 2008)
- Celtica Festival (Italy 2006, 2007, 2023)
- Celtivales ( France 2007)
- Triskell Festival (Italy 2008)
- The Third Programme of Polish Radio - Agnieszka Osiecka's Studio
- Nova Aria Celtic Festival (Italy 2008)<
- Bustofolk Festival (Italy 2007)
- Festival Beltine (the Czech Republic 2006, 2010)
- Ethno-jazz Festival (Moldova 2005)
- "Woodstock Stop" (Poland 2005)
- Festival Beltine (Slovakia 2005)<
- Festival Folkovy Kvitek (the Czech Republic 2005)
- FKC in Dowspudzie (Poland 2003)
- Castle Festival (Poland 2003- 2008)
- May Music Festival (Poland 2006 and 2007)
- Montelago Festival (Italy 2019)
- Ortigueira Festival (Spain 2019)

== Members ==
At present, the band is formed by:

- Adam Romański – fiddle
- Jakub Szczygieł - Irish flute, whistles
- Łukasz Kulesza - acoustic guitar
- Adam Stodolski - bass guitar
- Jan Gałczewski – bagpipe, bodhran, mandolin, banjo, electric guitar, Irish bouzouki
- SpacePierre – drums
- Jan Kubek – percussions (tabla, cajon, darabuka, Goblet drum, congas, timbales)

== Discography ==
- Rockhill (2004)
- KONCENtRAD (2007)
- TriÚ (2010)
- Live (2011)
- Miusjik (2015)
- Live'15 (2015)
- Observer (2023)

== Cooperation ==
The band also plays with Cracow a formation dancing Comhlan, with which it collaborates on the show Celtic Motion Project. Beltaine currently has one of its themes, Rockhill, as one of the new songs in the dance video game Pump It Up by Andamiro.
