= The Boys of the Old Brigade =

Irish rebel song

The Boys of the Old Brigade is an Irish rebel song written by Paddy McGuigan about the Irish Republican Army of the Irish War of Independence (1919-1921), and the anniversary of the 1916 Easter Rising.

== Lyrics ==
The song describes a veteran of the Easter Rising telling a young man about his old comrades in the Irish Republican Army. Each chorus ends with the Irish language phrase "a ghrá mo chroí (love of my heart), I long to see, the Boys of the Old Brigade".

Oh, father why are you so sad
On this bright Easter morn'
When Irish men are proud and glad
Of the land that they were born?!
Oh, son, I see in mem’ries few
Of far off distant days
When being just a lad like you
I joined the IRA

Where are the lads that stood with me
When history was made?
A Ghra Mo Chroi, I long to see
The boys of the old brigade

From hills and farms the call to arms
Was heard by one and all
And from the glen came brave young men
To answer Ireland’s call
T'was long ago we faced the foe
The old brigade and me
And by my side they fought and died
That Ireland might be free

Where are the lads that stood with me
When history was made?
A Ghra Mo Chroi, I long to see
The boys of the old brigade

And now, my boy, I’ve told you why
On Easter morn' I sigh
For I recall my comrades all
Of dark old days gone by
I think of men who fought in glen
With rifle and grenade
May heaven keep the men who sleep
From the ranks of the old brigade

Where are the lads that stood with me
When history was made?
A Ghra Mo Chroi, I long to see
The boys of the old brigade

== Controversy ==
In 2006, Celtic chief executive Peter Lawwell suggested that he was embarrassed by "offensive" chants in support of the Provisional IRA, even though these songs were political and not "overtly sectarian". In 2007, Celtic chairman Brian Quinn suggested that the "Boys of the Old Brigade" had no place at Celtic Park.

In 2008, UEFA abandoned an investigation into Celtic supporters singing the "Boys of the Old Brigade" due to lack of evidence.

In April 2011, Strathclyde Police chief superintendent, Andy Bates, warned that as part of a crackdown on sectarian singing at an upcoming Old Firm game: "If you sing the Boys of the Old Brigade, we'll arrest you and there have been convictions in court before where that song is concerned."

BBC Sportscene's Rob MacLean accused Celtic supporters of being sectarian for singing the song in May 2011.

In 2011, a Scottish court suggested that those showing support to the IRA were not being offensive to members of "a religious group".
