= The Rights of Man (album) =

Studio album by The Wolfe Tones
- Released: 1968
- Genre: Irish folk
- Label: Fontana Records

The Wolfe Tones chronology
Up the Rebels (1966)	The Rights of Man (1968)	Rifles of the I.R.A. (1970)

The Rights of Man is the third album by Irish folk and rebel band The Wolfe Tones. The album features songs of various themes including Irish republicanism and emigration.

== Track list ==
1. The Rights Of Man
2. Raynard The Fox
3. Long Black Veil
4. Up The Border
5. I'm A Rover
6. Ode To Biddy McGee
7. Wrap The Green Flag Round Me
8. Enniskillen Fusiliers
9. Treat Me Daughter Kindly
10. Four Strong Winds
11. Banks Of The Sweet Smirla Side
12. Lagan Love
