= The Barleycorn =

Irish traditional music band

- The Barleycorn in 1975

Background information
- Origin: Belfast, Northern Ireland
- Genres: Irish rebel music, Irish folk, Northern Irish folk
- Years active: 1971–1995
- Labels: Dolphin Records, Release Records
- Past members: John Delaney; Brian McCormick; Paddy McGuigan; Liam Tiernan; Paul Anderson; Derek McCormack; Paddy Sweeney; Dennis O'Rourke; Maurice McCarthy

The Barleycorn (also written as The Barley Corn) was an Irish traditional music and rebel music band.

The band, consisting of Paddy McGuigan, Liam Tiernan, Brian McCormick and John Delaney, was formed in mid-1971 in Belfast. Other musicians joined over the years, while some of the original members left.

Their first recording was "The Men Behind the Wire", produced by Billy McBurney in Belfast and pressed in Dublin by Release Records in December 1971. After its release on 14 December the song shot into the Irish charts, selling far more copies than any other single until then released in Ireland, and remained in the charts for months. It reached no. 1 position in the Irish charts on 22 January 1972, where it remained for three weeks. After a gap of one week, it returned to no. 1 for two weeks on 15 February. Royalties from the recording were donated to families of the internees. They also had big success with a follow-up single called 'Sing Irishmen sing'. In the following year the band made its debut album in the United States on Rex Records, The Barleycorn in America.

Paddy McGuigan was the first to leave the band, despite arguably contributing the most to its success with his songwriting, in 1975. Liam Tiernan left the band in 1981 and emigrated to Boston where he started his own pub. John Delaney stayed with the group until 1995, when the group broke up. He emigrated to the United States.

After the late Derek McCormack, "one of the finest voices of his generation", joined the band about 1982, the band undertook a change of direction to showcase his lyrical voice. The singer/guitarist Paddy Sweeney was in the group before going on to join the Dublin City Ramblers. Derek McCormack had previously been a member of Dermot O'Brien's band and later bass player with the Fureys.

The Barleycorn released "The Fields of Athenry" in 1982, reaching no. 7 in Ireland.

Barleycorn became firm favourites when they were the resident bands at a pub on the Expo88 grounds in Brisbane, Australia. They were so popular the pub operator brought them back for the last weeks of Expo.

== Personnel ==
- John Delaney – vocals, banjo, guitar, mandolin (1971–1995)
- Brian McCormick – vocals, bass (1971–1982)
- Paddy McGuigan – vocals, guitar, harmonica (1971–1975; died 2014)
- Liam Tiernan – vocals, guitar (1971–1981, 1993–1995)
- Paul Anderson – fiddle, tin whistle (1975–1981)
- Paddy Sweeney – vocals, guitar (1981–1988)
- Derek McCormack – vocals, bass, guitar (1982–1995; died 2004)
- Dennis O'Rourke – vocals, fiddle, guitar (1987–1990)
- Maurice McCarthy – vocals, fiddle, guitar, recorder (1990–1993)

== Discography ==
- Live in the Embankment (1972)
- In America (1973)
- The Winds Are Singing Freedom (1974)
- For Folk Sake (1975)
- Live in New York (1979)
- Fields of Athenry (1982)
- A Song for Ireland (1987)
- My Last Farewell (1988)
- The International (1989)
- New Decade (1990)
- Spectrum (1991)
- Green & Gold (1993)
- Waltzing's for Dreamers (1994)
- A Song for Ireland – The Very Best of the Barleycorn (2007)
