= Across the Broad Atlantic =

Studio album by The Wolfe Tones
- Released: 1976
- Genre: Irish folk
- Label: Triskel Records

The Wolfe Tones chronology
Irish to the Core (1976)	Across the Broad Atlantic (1976)	Belt of the Celts (1978)

Across the Broad Atlantic is the eighth album by Irish folk and rebel band The Wolfe Tones. The album features songs about Irish emigration to the United States.

== Track list ==
1. The Rambling Irishman
2. Paddy on the Railway
3. The Great Hunger
4. Many Young Men of Twenty
5. Sweet Tralee
6. Shores of America
7. A Dream of Liberty
8. Paddy's Green Shamrock Shore
9. Goodbye Mick
10. Spancil Hill
11. The Fighting 69th
12. The Boston Burglar
13. Farewell to Dublin
