= Flying Column (music group) =

Belfast folk music group

The Flying Column was the name of a Belfast folk group formed around 1967/68 who took their name from the Active Service Units of the Irish Republican Army that fought throughout Ireland during the War of Independence.

== Group ==
Eamonn Largey was the lead vocalist of the group and the founder, along with Paddy McGoldrick on tin whistle and vocals, and they were joined by Barney Evans on guitar and Sean Kelly on 5 string banjo. Kathleen McCready, who later married Eamonn and took his surname, regularly appeared as a guest with the group at various gigs and on their albums. Tony Lynch also played guitar and sang, Johnstons motor car and The castle of Dromore on the Four Green Fields album.

Barney and Sean, who featured on the group’s first album, left the group in 1971: Barney for health reasons and Sean to move to Cork. They were replaced by Benny and Paul for the second album. Other members of the group sometimes included John Delaney, Bill Tierney and Mal (Malcolm) Rogers.

Largey died in 1973. McCready died in 1979. Tony Lynch died in 2019.

== Music ==
The group’s material consisted of Irish ballads and rebel songs and they appeared at various concerts, republican clubs and fund-raising events. They also performed as the support act to many figures in entertainment such as the Dubliners, Joan Baez, Tommy Makem, The Bachelors and the Spinners and were also featured in Romano’s Ballroom at the Rose of Tralee festival.

The Flying Column’s first album “Folk Music Time in Ireland” was released in 1970 and they were among the earliest Belfast bands to issue a record. The songs on this LP were: Henry Joy, Come to the Bower, The Banks of the Ohio, The Boston Burglar, The Dying Rebel, Tom Williams, Belfast City, James Connolly, Whiskey in the Jar, When I Was Single and Banna Strand.

Their second album “Four Green Fields”, released in 1972, included Four Green Fields, Roisin Dubh, Sam Hall, Dirty Old Town, Sen South Medley, Madame Bonaparte, Johnston’s Motor Car, Boolavogue, Old Maid in a Garret, The Castle of Dromore, Legion of the Rearguard, and Song of the Dawn.
