= The Broad Black Brimmer =

Irish republican folk song

"The Broad Black Brimmer" is an Irish Republican folk song written by Art McMillen and first recorded in 1972.

The song narrates the story of a boy whose father died before he was born, fighting in the Irish Republican Army (IRA). The narrator is asked by his mother to try on his father's old uniform and as he does so, she tells his father's story. The title refers to the wide brimmed hat worn by many IRA guerrillas in the 1920s Irish War of Independence and Irish Civil War. Also referenced are a Sam Browne belt, britches, a trench coat and a holster – items of equipment commonly associated with the IRA of that era.

The theme of the song is Republican "unfinished business" from the 1920s – the cause of the dead father is passed on to his son. This is specifically related to the Irish Civil War of 1922 and to the subsequent IRA, which refused to acknowledge the legitimacy of either the Irish Free State or Northern Ireland states created at that time. Shortly after the narrator's father marries his mother comes the "truce and Treaty and the parting of the ways" (split in the IRA). The father is killed fighting on the anti-treaty side. Each chorus emphasises that although his holster has been, "empty for many a year"... "when men claim Ireland's freedom, the ones they'll choose to lead 'em will wear the broad black brimmer of the IRA". Moreover, at the line about holster being empty, the phrase "but not for long" is in the original version, but omitted by many covers (e.g. by Brier).

Because it specifically takes the Republican view of the Civil War and looks forward to a resumption of armed actions and to an Ireland led by the IRA, the song is associated with physical force Irish republicanism. It is often sung at Republican gatherings.

Another notable aspect of the song is its reference to Christianity. When the narrator's parents are married it is in the "little church below" and "Father Mac he blessed the pair as one". The explicit reference to religion is relatively rare in republican songs.

Some sources wrongly claim that it was written by Noel Nagle of the Wolfe Tones. Although performed by the Wolfe Tones in 1973, it had been released the year before by Declan Hunt on the Outlet subsidiary label R & O (Release & Outlet). It was credited to Art McMillan and even the Wolfe Tones did not claim to have written it giving it a "Trad. Arr." credit on their single Dolphin DOS.112.
