= Brian Warfield =

Irish musician born 1946

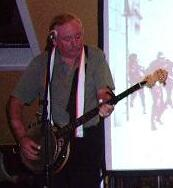
- Warfield performing in 2009
- Born: Patrick Brian Warfield; 2 April 1946 (age 80); Holles Street, Dublin, Ireland
- Occupations: Singer; Musician; Songwriter
- Spouse: June Warfield (née Radburn)
- Children: 4
- Musical career
- Origin: Bluebell, Dublin
- Genres: Irish Folk
- Instruments: Guitar; Banjo; Harp; Bodhrán; Vocals
- Years active: 1963-present
- Member of: The Wolfe Tones
- Website: wolfetonesofficialsite.com

Patrick Brian Warfield (born 2 April 1946, Holles Street, Dublin) is the vocalist, banjo, harp and bodhrán player and lead songwriter with long-standing Irish band The Wolfe Tones. Brian introduces many of the songs at the Wolfe Tones live concerts and is a keen historian.

== Personal life ==
Brian Warfield was born on 2 April 1946 in the National Maternity Hospital, Dublin and lived in the Dublin suburb Inchicore. He is one of the founding members and lead singers of the Irish Folk band, The Wolfe Tones. Warfield was the second born in a family of 4 boys. Today, Brian is married to his wife June Warfield (née Radburn) and resides in Blessington, County Wicklow.

As of July 2017, Brian has not communicated with his brother Derek Warfield since he left The Wolfe Tones in 2001, except when Joe Duffy unsuccessfully tried to get them to resolve their differences on the radio show Liveline in 2009.

In 2019, Warfield was diagnosed with Parkinson's disease, which was later shown to in fact be essential tremor. Despite this, he was still able to perform with the Wolfe Tones until their final concert in June of 2025.

He is a supporter of St Patrick's Athletic since his youth and in February 2026, The Wolfe Tones collaborated with the club on a third kit reassuring their logo and lyrics from Let the People Sing, with Warfield stating at the launch that "We're here celebrating the launch of a new jersey for our local side The Saints and we're very proud to do so. I think it's important to support local and that's why we've done this collaboration between The Wolfe Tones and the club, I've been following St Patrick's since I was about five or six, I went to the matches with my dad, we were mad Pat's fans in Inchicore. Our recreation every second week was to go to the home games and some away too if they weren't too far. Music was always part of our lives and part of football. My family, including generations of my grandads and great grandads and my dad, all worked in the Inchicore Works, so we have a long history of being part of Inchicore. It's a wonderful area and we've always loved St Pat's, our connection with The Saints will last forever. Let the people sing."

== Career ==
Warfield has written many songs for the Wolfe Tones, notably "The Helicopter Song", "Irish Eyes" and "My Heart is in Ireland". "Let the People Sing", was written in dedication to those Irish ballad singers who were banned from singing Irish songs. It has been performed by many Celtic and Irish Rebel bands, including Celtic band Charlie and the Bhoys. The song is popular among fans of Celtic F.C. and a version "Let The People Sing" performed by The Malleys, omitting the second verse, is played at Celtic Park on match days.

Warfield's affiliation with Celtic Football Club led to him being asked to write a song for the Club to celebrate its 100th anniversary. As a result, Celtic Symphony was composed; a song popular with many Celtic fans, but controversial due to its chorus. The chorus which features the words "ooh, ah, up the RA" was often seen as a pro-IRA stance, but according to its writer, Brian Warfield, these words were included in the balladic tradition of writing what is observed at the time. He’s also a keen supporter of Everton Football Club he’s mentioned many times.

As a songwriter, Warfield's writing is typically a social commentary on Ireland and its issues. For the 2012 album, Child of Destiny, Warfield composed 'Swing A Banker', which is a comical ballad referring to Irish bankers as chickens. The music video was recorded outside the Treasury Building in Dublin. He is currently working on a musical about the famine. He continued to tour with The Wolfe Tones with Tommy Byrne and Noel Nagle until their final show in June of 2025.

Despite the end of touring, Warfield remains an active artist. At the start of 2025, he announced a new musical he has written called "Celtic Exodus".

== Bibliography ==
- Warfield, Brian (2018). The Ramblings of an Irish Ballad Singer. Skin Music Publishers. ISBN 978-1-9993352-0-5.
