= Derek Warfield =

Irish singer-songwriter (born 1943)

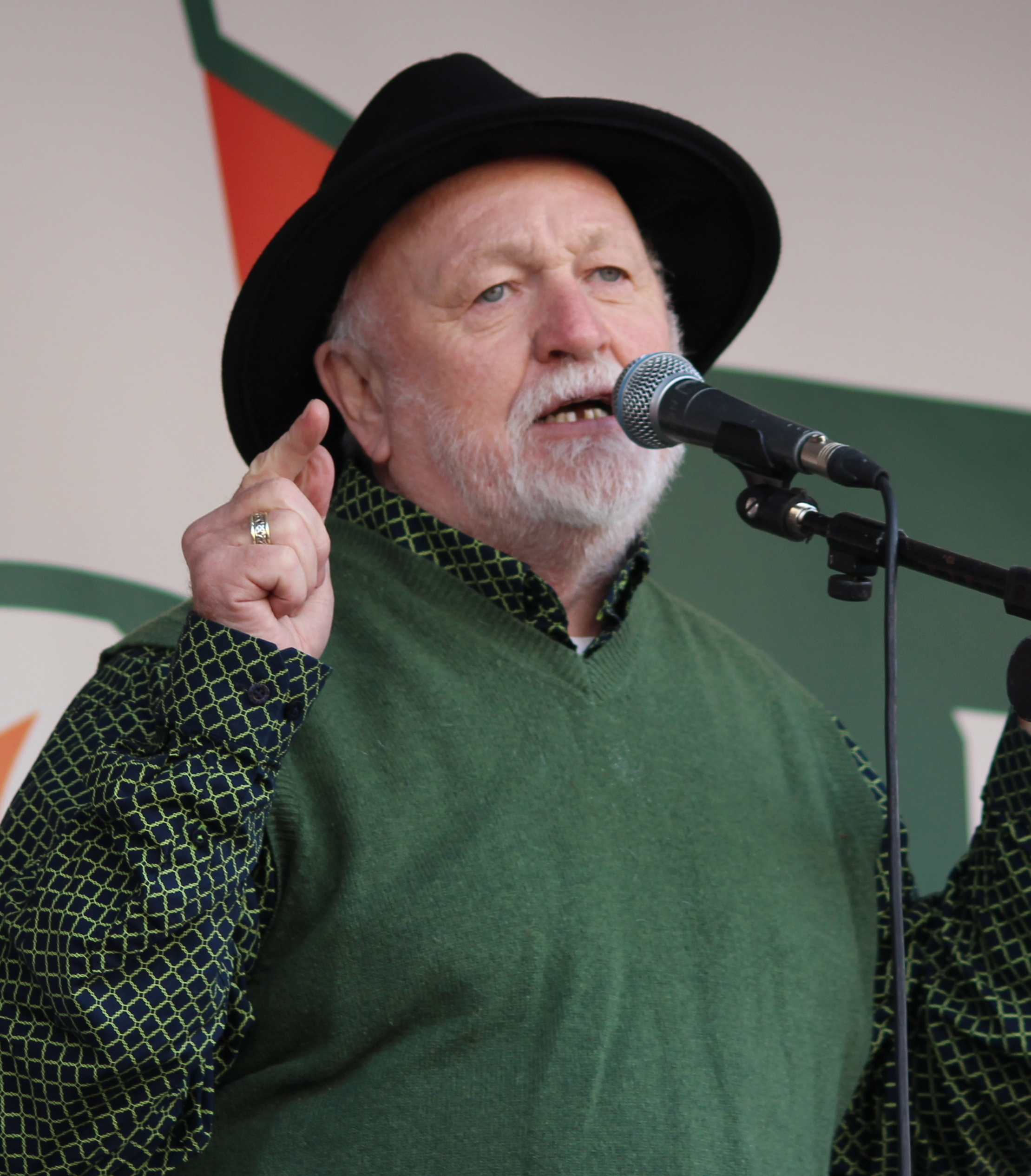
- Warfield in 2015
- Born: 15 September 1943 (age 82); Dublin, Ireland
- Education: Synge Street CBS
- Occupations: Singer; Songwriter; Historian
- Known for: The Wolfe Tones

Derek Warfield (born 15 September 1943) is an Irish singer, songwriter, historian, and a former member of the musical group The Wolfe Tones.

== Personal life ==
Born in the Dublin suburb Inchicore, Warfield was educated at Synge Street CBS. He was apprenticed as a tailor until becoming a folk musician. He lives in Kilcock, County Kildare. On 1 March 2006, Warfield's wife Nuala died, followed by the death of his eldest daughter on 28 September 2007.

As of July 2017, Derek had not spoken to his brother and former bandmate Brian Warfield since he left the Wolfe Tones in 2001, except when Joe Duffy unsuccessfully tried to get them to resolve their differences on the radio show Liveline in 2009. The pair finally reunited for the first time since the 2001 split in March 2026 at Brian Warfield's 80th birthday celebrations.

He is a cousin of Sinn Féin Senator Fintan Warfield.

== Career ==
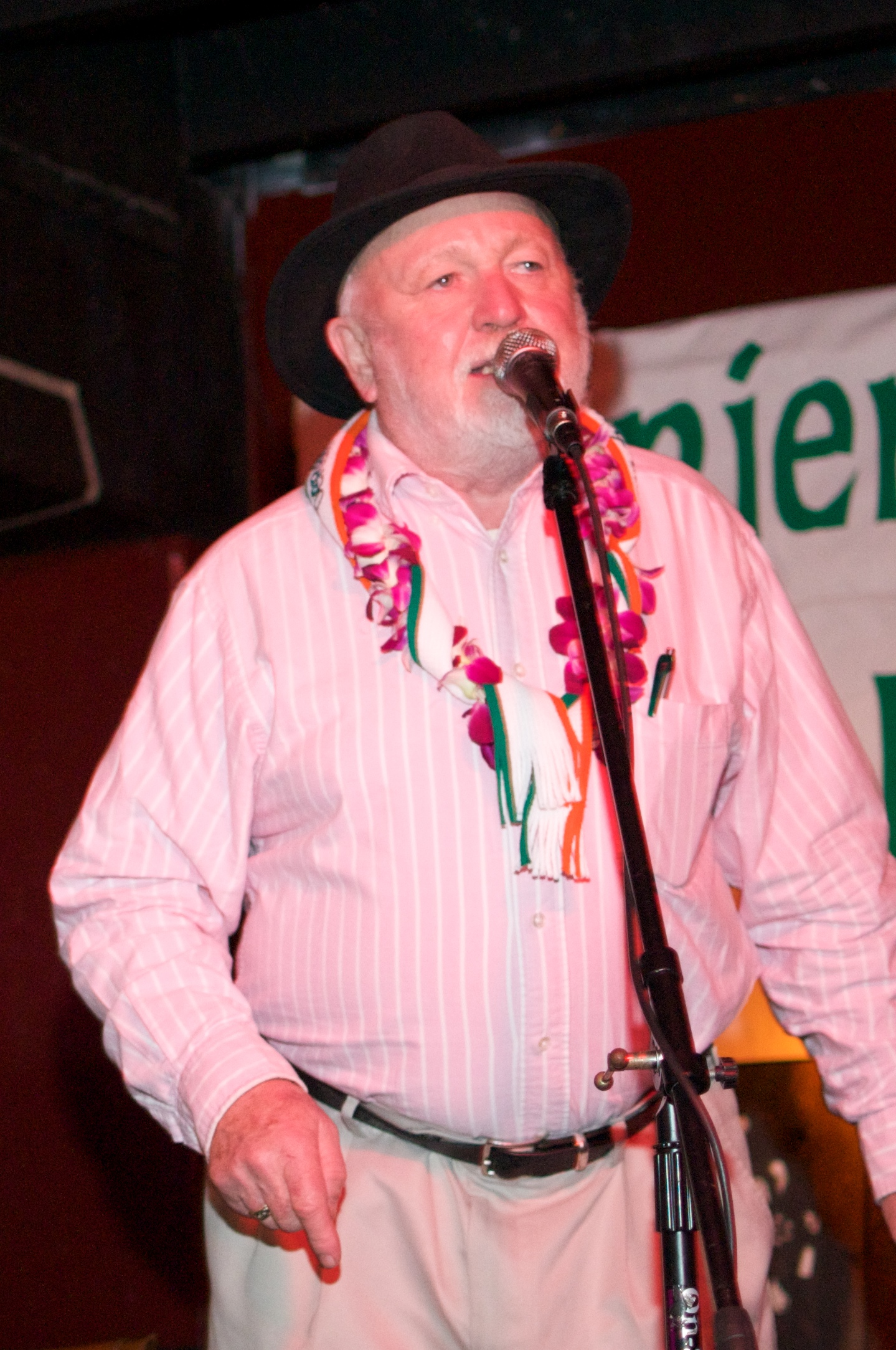
Warfield performing live in Honolulu, 2012

Derek Warfield is a singer, songwriter, mandolin player and a founding member of the Wolfe Tones, performing with the band for nearly thirty seven years, writing and recording over 60 songs. As a founding member of The Wolfe Tones he featured on every album recorded by the band from 1965's debut album The Foggy Dew through to 1989's 25th Anniversary.

A solo album, Legacy was released in 1995 and was followed with Liberte' '98, Sons of Erin, Take Me Home To Mayo and Clear The Way. Warfield also has a video Legacy and two books, The Songs and Ballads of 1798 and The Irish Songster of the American Civil War.

Warfield has performed his music and songs at American Civil War events and commemorations at such sites as Gettysburg, Sharpsburg and Harrisburg with his band, The Sons of Erin. Warfield's 2002 release, Clear the Way is the second in his Irish Songs in the Civil War series.

The ballad "Take Me Home To Mayo", written by Belfastman Seamus Robinson as a tribute to Michael Gaughan, was recorded as a duet with Irish American Andy Cooney and is the title track of another 2002 Warfield release.

In 2005 Warfield released the song "Celtic Celtic (That's the Team for Me)" for the Celtic F.C. football club. It is one of the singles on album Songs for the Bhoys.

In March 2006, Warfield released his ninth solo album, a 36-song double CD of Irish songs. In 2012, Warfield released an album called Bonnie Blue Flag, celebrating the Confederate Army and particularly the Irish people who fought for the Confederate States of America.

He now tours with his new band, Derek Warfield and The Young Wolfe Tones.

== Books written ==
A biography of Robert Emmet in two volumes, although not written by Derek Warfield, has been published by him, and a collaboration with Raymond Daly of Tullamore has resulted in the publishing of a critically acclaimed book of lyrics and histories of Irish songs called Celtic and Ireland in Song and Story.

== Controversies ==
1964–2001

In 1989, a contract was signed by Derek Warfield, signing rights to an American distributor, Shanachie Records. The contents of this contract were apparently misrepresented to the other members of the band, the Wolfe Tones, resulting in a clause that prevented them from recording any new material. Unable to reverse this agreement, they continued to tour, albeit without any new material.

In 1995, Derek Warfield released a solo studio album entitled "Legacy" as he was still eligible to record under his own name. With Warfield on vocals and mandolin, the music on this album was performed by a new band, although he was still touring with the Wolfe Tones. His solo releases continued annually until 2006.

In 2001, after a show played in Limerick, Derek Warfield departed the band to concentrate on his own career. Calling themselves "Brian Warfield, Tommy Byrne and Noel Nagle, formerly of the Wolfe Tones" the three would later go on to release "You'll Never Beat the Irish" and the subsequent album "Child of Destiny".

2003

In 2003, after a complaint from an Ulster Unionist politician, Roy Beggs, Jr., a radio channel dedicated to the music of Derek Warfield was removed from the in-flight entertainment of Aer Lingus. Beggs complained of the "Blatant promotion of militant, armed republicanism" by the playing of this music, saying it was the same as "the speeches of Osama bin Laden being played on a trans-Atlantic Arabian airline". Aer Lingus removed the material from their flights stating: "It is something that should not have been on board and we removed it immediately we became aware of it".
