= The Wolfe Tones =

Irish rebel music band

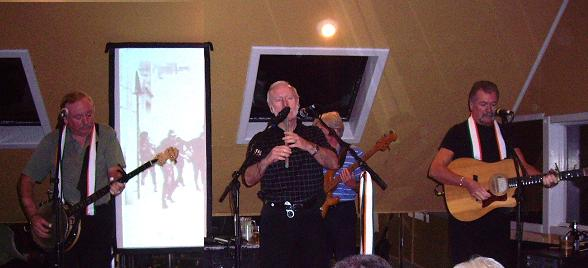
- From left to right: Brian Warfield, Noel Nagle and Tommy Byrne

Background information
- Origin: Bluebell, Dublin, Ireland
- Genres: Irish folk; Irish rebel songs; rock
- Works: Discography
- Years active: 1963–present
- Labels: Skin Music; Dolphin
- Members: Noel Nagle; Brian Warfield; Tommy Byrne
- Past members: Liam Courtney; Derek Warfield
- Website: wolfetonesofficialsite.com

The Wolfe Tones are an Irish folk and ballad group, famous for performing rebel songs, historical ballads, and Traditional Irish music with strong nationalist themes. Formed in 1963, they take their name from Theobald Wolfe Tone, one of the leaders of the Irish Rebellion of 1798, also carrying a double meaning, referencing the wolf tone; a sound that can affect instruments in the string family of the orchestra.

The Wolfe Tones being one of the longest standing ballad groups in Ireland, gathered popularity from their distinctive melodies and a repertoire that mixes traditional tunes with original songs about Irish history, politics, and culture. The band's accolades include receiving the keys to the cities of New York and Los Angeles, and their version of Thomas Davis' rebel song 'A Nation Once Again' was voted the world's favourite song in a 2002 BBC World poll.

== History ==
=== 1963–1964: Formation ===
The origins of the group date back to August 1963, where Brian Warfield, Noel Nagle, and Liam Courtney had been neighbours as children in the Dublin suburb of Inchicore. In August 1964, Brian's brother Derek Warfield joined the band, and in November 1964 Tommy Byrne replaced Courtney, creating the band's most recognizable line-up, which would last for nearly 37 years until January 2001.

=== 1964–2001 ===
In 1995, Derek Warfield released a solo studio album entitled Legacy as he was still eligible to record under his own name. With Derek on vocals and mandolin, the music on this album was performed by a new band, although he was still touring with the Wolfe Tones. Derek's solo releases continued annually until 2006.

=== 2001–present ===
The Wolfe Tones continued to tour as a three-piece band.

In 2022–2024, the band played shows in the Olympia Theatre, Dublin, the INEC Ireland, Broadway (Manhattan) in New York, the Atheneum Chicago and Electric Picnic.

However, they announced their retirement in 2023, with a 60th-anniversary tour to conclude their career. As well as gigs in the US, the band played concerts at Galway Airport, Castlebar, Co. Mayo and in the 3Arena, with the band's advertised final gig taking place in Dublin on 13 October 2024.

On 23 August 2024, the band released a final single, Goodbye to All Our Friends.

Despite the 3Arena show being advertised as the band's final gig, the band announced two shows at Thomond Park in Limerick for July 2025, as well as a gig in Liverpool. The final concert took place at Thomond Park on 13 July, 2025.

In December 2025, the band ended their retirement by announcing two shows in July 2026 in the 3Arena. In January 2026, the band announced another show taking place on 25 June, at the Ovo Hydro in Glasgow. This was followed by shows in August at the Gleneagle Arena, Killarney and the SSE Arena in Belfast in August.

In February 2026, the band featured in a collaboration with their local League of Ireland football club St Patrick's Athletic that saw the club release a Wolfe Tones themed third kit, including their logo in place of a sponsor and lyrics from Let The People Sing featured throughout the jersey. On 28 March 2026, the band reunited with Derek Warfield during Brian Warfield's 80th birthday celebrations, which was also attended by Mary Lou McDonald, Kellie Harrington and Oliver Barry.

== Notable works ==
The song "Irish Eyes" was written by Brian Warfield as a paean for his mother Kathleen who died of cancer the year prior to its release. A song about emigration to London entitled "My Heart is in Ireland" became a number 2 hit for the band. The song "Celtic Symphony" was written by Warfield in 1987 for the centenary of Celtic Football Club. Other songs written by the group include "Joe McDonnell", a song about the life and death of the Provisional IRA member Joe McDonnell, who was the fifth person to die on the 1981 Hunger Strike; and "The Protestant Men", a song about notable Protestant Irish nationalists. The band also covered "The Streets of New York", written by Liam Reilly from Bagatelle who was inspired by stories of the Tones' friendship with the NYPD.

Footballer James McClean attracted criticism when he tweeted that he listened to their rendition of “The Broad Black Brimmer” before a match, a song in which a son learns of how his father was killed in fighting for the IRA. He was told by club manager Martin O'Neill to refrain from using Twitter.

In 2002, after an allegedly orchestrated e-mail campaign by fans to "try and mess it up" their rendition of "A Nation Once Again" by Thomas Osborne Davis was voted the number one song of all time in a BBC World Service poll. The BBC hosts an artist's page for the band that includes excerpts of their songs.

The band's 1982 hit “Admiral William Brown” pays homage to the Irish-born Argentine sailor William Brown.

In January 2020, the band's version of "Come Out Ye Black and Tans" reached No. 1 on the Ireland and UK iTunes charts, following criticism of the Irish government's planned commemoration of the RIC, as part of its 'Decade of Commemoration'. As a result of this, on 10 January, the song entered the Irish Singles Chart at No. 33 and also debuted at No. 1 in the Scottish Singles Chart.

== Personnel ==
=== Members ===
Current members

- Noel Nagle – tin whistle, low whistle, uileann pipes, vocals (1963–present)
- Brian Warfield – banjo, whistle, harp, piano, guitars, bodhran, vocals (1963–present)
- Tommy Byrne – guitars, vocals (1964–present)

Former members

- Liam Courtney – guitars, vocals (1963–1964)
- Derek Warfield – mandolin, vocals (1964–2001)

=== Lineups ===
August 1963 – August 1964	August 1964 – November 1964	November 1964 – January 2001	January 2001 – Present
Liam Courtney – guitars, vocals; Noel Nagle – tin whistle, low whistle, uileann pipes, vocals; Brian Warfield – banjo, whistle, harp, piano, guitars, bodhran, vocals	Liam Courtney – guitars, vocals; Noel Nagle – tin whistle, low whistle, uileann pipes, vocals; Brian Warfield – banjo, whistle, harp, piano, guitars, bodhran, vocals; Derek Warfield – mandolin, vocals	Noel Nagle – tin whistle, low whistle, uileann pipes, vocals; Brian Warfield – banjo, whistle, harp, piano, guitars, bodhran, vocals; Derek Warfield – mandolin, vocals; Tommy Byrne – guitars, vocals	Noel Nagle – tin whistle, low whistle, uileann pipes, vocals; Brian Warfield – banjo, whistle, harp, piano, guitars, bodhran, vocals; Tommy Byrne – guitars, vocals

== Discography ==
Studio albums

- The Foggy Dew (1965)
- Up the Rebels (1966)
- The Rights of Man (1968)
- Rifles of the I.R.A. (1970)
- Let the People Sing (1972)
- 'Till Ireland a Nation (1974)
- Irish to the Core (1976)
- Across the Broad Atlantic (1976)
- Belt of the Celts (1978)
- Spirit of the Nation (1981)
- As Gaeilge (1982)
- A Sense of Freedom (1983)
- Profile (1985)
- Sing Out for Ireland (1987)
- 25th Anniversary (1989)
- You'll Never Beat the Irish (2001)
- The Troubles (2004)
- Child of Destiny (2011)
- The Dublin Rebellion 1916 (2016)
