= Artistic reactions to the 1981 Irish hunger strike =

Between 1 March 1976 and 3 October 1981, Irish republican prisoners in HM Prison Maze carried out a variety of protests against the withdrawal of Special Category Status for prisoners convicted of proscribed "terrorism" offences. These protests culminated in the 1981 Irish hunger strike in which ten prisoners died.

This article lists the various artistic responses to these protests, made at the time and subsequently by artists supportive or opposing the protestors, and by artists who were uninvolved in the conflict.

== Street Art ==
Following the hunger strike, nationalist murals depicting those considered martyrs of the hungerstrike, such as Bobby Sands began to appear, relying on images and iconography developed by prisoners who hand crafted works of art and decorated their cells with murals and painting. Over one hundred murals were painted in 1981 by Catholic youth, with the lark in barbed wire as the most common secular symbolic image, due largely to Sands's use of the lark in his writings and as a pseudonym. Other popular images included the H representing H-block, crosses and flags, with secular images predominating, many with mottos and poems, and many murals were copies of photographs, such as the firing squad at Bobby Sands funeral service.

- The People's Gallery is an area in the Bogside area of Derry, where a trio of artists known as the Bogside Artists have created a series of murals depicting events during the Troubles. The Raymond McCartney mural on Rossville street, Bogside, is dedicated to "The H Block & Armagh Prison Struggle And In Memory Of Bobby Sands, Kevin Lynch, Frank Hughes, Kieron Doherty, Raymond McCreesh, Tom McElwee, Patsy O'Hare, Michael Devine, Martin Hurson, Joe McDonnell." This mural depicts Raymond McCarney alongside a woman who suffered during the hunger strike. In black and white, the man resembles Christ, and recalls both Christ's suffering at the hands of barbarians and his fasting in the desert.
- A mural depicting Bobby Sands still exists on the gable end of the headquarters building of Sinn Féin, on the Falls Road in Belfast.
- In the Ardoyne area of Belfast, a street mural dedicated to the 1981 hunger strikers on the 25th anniversary of Martin Hurson's death.
- In 2001 a mural dedicated to the memory Patsy O'Hara was created at Ardfoyle in Bishop Street.
- In 2008 Ógra Shinn Féin painted a mural in the town of Derry honouring the hunger strikers.

== Poetry ==
- One of the hunger strikers, Bobby Sands wrote poetry throughout the protest. His best known poems include Weeping Winds and The Rhythm of Time. Sands's narratives and various poems appear in the anthology Skylark Sing Your Lonely Song, and his poetry has been set to music by Seán Tyrell for his album A Message of Peace.
- Vincent Buckley, 'Hunger Strike', published in Last Poems 1991
- Award-winning poet Medbh McGuckian cites Bobby Sands's hunger strike as an influence on her poetry, saying "We moved into a house and I have a lot of moving-into-a-house poems around that time; but, they're all thinking about Bobby Sands. You wouldn't know they were about Bobby Sands because I made him into a kind of icon." McGuckian also says that shortly following Sands's death, she was unable to write poetry to him, but commemorated the twenty-fifth anniversary of his death with The Sands of Saint Cyprien, a poetic depiction of the Saint Cyprien concentration camp.
- In Bobby Sands desfallece en el muro, Chilean poet Carmen Berenguer draws parallels between Chile under Pinochet and Northern Ireland of 1981, adopting Sands's voice in the first person.
- In Paula Meehan's poem Hunger Strike, a female voice refers to the prisoners in H-block, speaking in the first person plural, identifying with the community's rage at the authorities refusal to relent. The persona undertakes a "personal strike", adopting first personal singular and withdrawing from life, her garden untended, as the image of the dying Sands dominates the community's awareness. Towards the end, an old woman rescues the speaker, bring her bread and butter, and chiding her for her self-imposed alienation.
- For Bobby Sands on the Eve of his Death by Michael Davitt.

== Fiction ==
- Hunger Strike - Reflections on the 1981 Republican Hunger Strike, edited by Danny Morrison, was published to commemorate the 25th anniversary of the hunger strike, and featured contributions, many of them specially commissioned, from well-known novelists and poets, former prisoners and activists.
- Everything in this country must by Colum McCann, published in 2006 features the novella "Hunger Strike" written from the perspective of a boy going through puberty at the same time as his uncle is in Long Kesh, taking part in a hunger strike. Asked why he had chosen to write about the hunger strike, he said "...as far as I know there has been no fictional examination of the wound that the Hunger Strikes left on all of us. Twenty years have passed, perhaps just long enough for us to begin to see this history a new light. I believe that fiction can capture the moment when the thorn enters the skin."
- The British/Irish novelist Marion Urch set her 1996 novel "Violent Shadows" (Headline Review 1996) in the year of the hunger strikes. The novel is included in many summaries of Troubles fiction including "Gangsters and Guerillas" Patrick Magee. 2001. It was also the subject of a PhD "Representing the Unnarratable -Feminist Terrorism" by Pamela Grieman (University of Southern California. 2010) An extract from the novel was shortlisted for the Irish Post short story competition in 1995. Adjudicator Patrick McCabe called it "powerful, it seems to document all the pain of Irish history in a few short pages."

== Theatre ==
Bobby Sands, M.P. is a play written by Judy GeBauer.

== Films ==
- Hunger
- Some Mother's Son
- H3
- Bobby Sands: 66 Days

== Songs ==
A number of songs were written in response to the hunger strike by artists and groups such as Christy Moore and the Wolfe Tones, including some songs based on the poetry Sands wrote, Some of the songs are memorials to specific participants in the strike, such as The Boy from Tamlaghduff, written by Christy Moore in 1983 in memory of Francis Hughes. A few songs were written by Sands such as McIlhatton, a song about a moonshiner, and Back Home in Derry, a ballad about deportees. The British government has at times banned some of these song, such as The Time has Come and Joe McDonnell. In 2006, a proposed bill which would outlaw promotion or glorification of terrorist or violent acts raised concerns that performance of Irish songs such as The H-Block Song, which had become an anthem of the Irish Republicans following the hunger strike, could lead to imprisonment.

Many Irish rebel songs focus on a person or persons viewed as a martyr, with themes of endurance, daring, loyalty, and the artistic, moral and intellectual qualities of the subjects. The notion of endurance has been associated with the belief that sufferers, rather than those at whose hand they suffer, will ultimately triumph in seen in the songs about the ten hunger strikers. In Bobby Sands, MP, Sands is portrayed as an artist and poet. The theme of sacrifice also plays a role, such as the hunger striker asking his family to let him go in The Time has Come, written by Christy Moore and Donal Lunny about the final meeting between Patsy O'Hara and his mother.

- The Boy from Tamlaghduff, written and performed by Christy Moore
- Back Home in Derry, by Bobby Sands, performed by Christy Moore
- McIlhatton, written by Bobby Sands performed by Christy Moore
- On the Blanket, written and performed by Mick Hanly and Christy Moore
- Southern Winds - a song about Ray McCreesh written and performed by Christy Moore
- Ninety Miles from Dublin - Written and performed by Christy Moore.
- The Roll of Honour - Gerry O'Glacain (The Irish Brigade)
- Death Before Revenge - Pangur Ban
- The H-block Song, written by Francie Brolly
- The People's Own MP - Christy Moore
- Song For Marcella - Bik McFarlane
- 10 Years On - Blaggers I.T.A.
- Bobby Sands - Soldat Louis
- Bobby Sands - Meic Stevens
- Inspiration - Easterhouse: Written in honour of the hunger strikers, the sleeve for the release bore an image of Bobby Sands.
- Bobby Untitled - Nicky Wire on his album "I Killed The Zeitgeist"
- It's Going To Happen! - The Undertones: This song contains a "vague" appeal to Margaret Thatcher to reverse her position in the face of the hunger strike. Although the Undertones were reluctant to engage in politics, after the death of Sands in 1982, guitarist Damian O'Neill wore a black armband honouring Bobby Sands when the band performed on Top of the Pops.
- The Sign, written by Eric Bogle
- The Time Has Come - Christy Moore
- The Ballad of Joe McDonnell - The Wolfe Tones
- O'Hara, Hughes, McCreesh and Sands - song - composed by Séamus Mac Mathúna
- Kevin Lynch - The Irish Brigade
- Farewell to Bellaghy - Gerry O'Glacain.
- The Ballad of Martin Hurson - Gerry O'Glacain.
- He's Gone - Jerry Garcia
- The Story of Thomas McElwee - Crucifucks
