= Up the Rebels =

Studio album by The Wolfe Tones
- Released: 1966
- Genre: Irish folk
- Label: Dolphin Records

The Wolfe Tones chronology
The Foggy Dew (1965)	Up the Rebels (1966)	The Rights Of Man (1968)

Up the Rebels is the second album by Irish folk and rebel band The Wolfe Tones. The title, 'Up the Rebels' is a popular slogan in support of the Irish Republican Army. The album mixes rebel ballads, comic songs, and traditional material.

== Track listing ==
1. The Man From Mullingar
2. Three Coloured Ribbon
3. Dying Rebel
4. Finding Of Moses
5. Banna Strand
6. Banks of the Ohio
7. Down By The Liffey Side
8. Valley Of Knockanure
9. Blow Ye Winds
10. Black Ribbon Band
11. The Old Maid
12. Goodbye Mrs. Durkin
13. Song Of The Backwoods
