= Irish rebel song =

Music genre

In the music of Ireland, Irish rebel songs are folk songs which are primarily about the various rebellions against British Crown rule. Songs about prior rebellions are a popular topic of choice among musicians who support Irish nationalism and republicanism.

When they discuss events during the 20th and 21st centuries, Irish rebel songs focus on physical force Irish republicanism in the context of the Easter Rising, the Irish War of Independence, the Anti-Treaty IRA during the Irish Civil War, and, more recently, the Troubles in Northern Ireland.

== History ==
The tradition of rebel music in Ireland dates back to the period of English (and later British) crown rule, and it describes historical events in Irish history such as rebellions against the Crown and reinforces the desire for self-determination among the Irish people and the Irish diaspora. Although they have a deep-rooted sense of tradition, rebel songs have nonetheless remained contemporary, and since the end of the Irish Civil War in 1923, the focus has moved onto the nationalist cause in Northern Ireland and the Irish Free State, including support for the Anti-Treaty IRA, the Provisional IRA, the INLA, and Sinn Féin. However, the subject matter is not confined to Irish history, and includes the exploits of the Connolly Column, who fought for the Republican side in the Spanish Civil War, and also Irish Americans who participated in the American Civil War. There are also some songs that express sorrow over war (from a Republican perspective), such as Only our rivers run free, and some have been covered by bands who have modified lyrics to be explicitly anti-war, such as the cover of The Patriot Game by Scottish band The Bluebells.

In August 1971, the Irish Independent reported that RTÉ, the Irish state broadcaster, had decided to restrict the broadcasting of an album of Irish rebel songs entitled "Up The Rebels" (featuring the Wolfe Tones), which had been recently re-released by Dolphin Records. A spokesman for RTÉ said that the broadcaster had made the decision not to "play records which could create tension in Northern Ireland", but assured that the decision would be rescinded once the problems in Northern Ireland had subsided.

Over the years, a number of bands have performed "crossover" music, that is, Irish rebel lyrics and instrumentation mixed with other, more pop-oriented styles. Damien Dempsey is known for his pop-influenced rebel ballads, and bands like Beltaine's Fire and Kneecap combine Rebel music with political hip hop and other genres.

=== Contemporary music ===
Irish rebel music has occasionally gained international attention. The Wolfe Tones' version of A Nation Once Again was voted the number one song in the world by BBC World Service listeners in 2002. Many of the more popular acts recently such as Saoirse, Éire Óg, Athenrye, Shebeen, Mise Éire and Pádraig Mór are from Glasgow. The Bog Savages of San Francisco are fronted by an escapee from Belfast's Long Kesh prison who made his break in the September 1983 "Great Escape" by the IRA.

Music of this genre has often courted controversy, with some of this music effectively banned from the airwaves in the Republic of Ireland in the 1980s. More recently, Derek Warfield's music was banned from Aer Lingus flights, after the Ulster Unionist politician Roy Beggs Jr compared his songs to the speeches of Osama bin Laden. However, a central tenet of the justification for rebel music from its supporters is that it represents a long-standing tradition of freedom from tyranny.

Themes include "Arbour Hill", about the place; "Fergal O'Hanlon", about the man; "Northern Gaels"/"Crumlin Jail", about the prison; "The Ballad of Mairead Farrell", about the woman; "Seán Treacy", about the man; and "Pearse Jordan", about the man.

On the occasion of his being the first Irish actor to win the BAFTA Award for Best Actor in a Leading Role in 2024 for Oppenheimer, Cillian Murphy quipped "It means a lot to me to be Irish. I don't know what else to say – should I sing a rebel song?".

== List of notable songs by era of subject ==
=== Nine Years War ===
- Follow me up to Carlow
- Róisín Dubh

=== Rapparee songs ===
- Éamonn an Chnoic (a.k.a. Ned of the Hill)
- Mná na h-Éireann

=== Jacobite songs ===
- Aisling
- Mo Ghile Mear

=== Irish rising of 1798 ===
- Boolavogue
- The Boys of Wexford
- The Bold Fenian Men a.k.a. Down by the Glenside
- Come All You Warriors
- The Croppy Boy
- Dunlavin Green
- The Minstrel Boy
- The Rising of the Moon
- The Wearing of the Green
- Tone's Grave (a.k.a. Bodenstown Churchyard)
- The Wind that Shakes the Barley

=== 19th-century ===
- A Nation Once Again
- The Fields of Athenry
- God Save Ireland
- The Peeler and the Goat
- Skibbereen

=== Easter Rising of 1916 ===
- Amhrán na bhFiann, (a.k.a. The Soldier's Song) – officially adopted as the Irish National Anthem on 12 July 1926
- Banna Strand (a.k.a. Lonely Banna Strand)
- The Broad Black Brimmer
- Erin Go Bragh
- The Foggy Dew (Irish ballad)
- James Connolly; about the man
- Oró Sé do Bheatha 'Bhaile

=== Irish War of Independence ===
- The Boys of the Old Brigade
- Come Out, Ye Black and Tans
- Johnston's Motor Car
- Kevin Barry
- Mise Éire
- The Valley of Knockanure

=== Irish Civil War ===
- Soldiers of '22
- Take It Down from the Mast

=== IRA Border Campaign ===
- Sean South
- The Patriot Game

=== The Troubles ===
- Belfast Brigade
- Back Home in Derry, by Bobby Sands; to the tune of The Wreck of the Edmund Fitzgerald
- Connaught Rangers (a.k.a. The Drums Were Beating), about the regiment
- Four Green Fields by Tommy Makem
- Give Ireland Back to the Irish
- Go on home, British soldiers
- The Helicopter Song
- Irish Citizen Army; about the organisation
- Irish Volunteers; about the organisation
- Join the British Army
- My Little Armalite
- The Men Behind the Wire
- Roll of Honour
- Sunday Bloody Sunday (by John Lennon and Yoko Ono — the U2 song of the same name is "not a rebel song")
- Tiocfaidh ár lá (a.k.a. SAM song)
- You'll Never Beat the Irish
- Ambush at Drumnakilly
- Arthur McBride
- The Boy from Tamlaghtduff
- Dying Rebel
- Gerard Casey; about the man.
- Ireland Unfree; named for the oration
- Joe McDonnell; about the man
- Martin Hurson; about the man
- Men of the West;
- Only Our Rivers Run Free; by Mickey MacConnell
- Pat of Mullingar
- The People's Own MP
- Streets of Sorrow/Birmingham Six
- Tom Williams; about the man.
- There Were Roses, by Tommy Sands

== Sunday Bloody Sunday (U2 song) ==
The 1983 U2 album War includes the song "Sunday Bloody Sunday", a lament for the Northern Ireland troubles whose title alludes to the 1972 Bloody Sunday shooting of Catholic demonstrators by British soldiers. In concert, Bono began introducing the song with the disclaimer "this song is not a rebel song". These words are included in the version on Under a Blood Red Sky, the 1983 live album of the War Tour. The 1988 concert film Rattle and Hum includes a performance that was staged only hours after the 1987 Remembrance Day bombing in Enniskillen, which Bono condemns in a mid-song rant.

In response, Sinéad O'Connor released a song with the title "This is a Rebel Song", as she explains in her live album How About I Be Me (And You Be You)?

== Satire ==
- During the 1990s, Irish comedian Dermot Morgan lampooned both the Wolfe Tones and the clichés of Irish rebel songs by singing about the martyrdom of Fido, an Alsatian dog who saves his IRA master in the Irish War of Independence. During a search of the house by the Black and Tans, Fido hides his master's hand grenade by eating it. When Fido farts and the grenade explodes, the British comment: "Excuse me, mate, was there something your dog ate?!" In a parody of Thomas Osborne Davis' famous rebel song "A Nation Once Again", the song climaxes with the words: "Another martyr for old Ireland, by Britannia cruelly slain! I hope that somewhere up there he'll be an Alsatian once again! An Alsatian once again! An Alsatian once again! That Fido who's now in ribbons will be an Alsatian once again!"
- Irish-American actor and comedian Denis Leary engaged in a similarly brutal mockery of rebel songs and their cliches in Traditional Irish Song.

== See also ==
- Charlie and the Bhoys
- The Clancy Brothers and Tommy Makem
- The Dubliners
- Go Lucky Four
- David Kincaid
- Christy Moore
- Dermot O'Brien
- Tuan
