= Listen (Christy Moore album) =

Studio album by Christy Moore
- Released: 17 April 2009
- Genre: Folk
- Label: Columbia
- Producer: Declan Sinnott

Christy Moore chronology
Live at the Point (2006)	Listen (2009)	Folk Tale (2011)

Professional ratings
Review scores
Source	Rating
Allmusic	link

Listen is an album by Irish folk singer Christy Moore, released in Ireland on 17 April 2009 by Columbia Records. Recorded with long-time accompanist Declan Sinnott, it is his first studio album since 2005's Burning Times. The album debuted at number one on the Irish Albums Chart.

== Track listing ==
1. "Listen" (Hank Wedel) – 2:48
2. "Does This Train Stop on Merseyside?" (Ian Prowse) – 3:32
3. "Shine On You Crazy Diamond" (David Gilmour, Richard Wright, Roger Waters) – 5:07
4. "The Ballad of Ruby Walsh" (Christy Moore) – 3:39
5. "China Waltz" (Donagh Long) – 3:11
6. "Barrowland" (Christy Moore, Wally Page) – 3:15
7. "Duffy's Cut" (Tony Boylan, Wally Page) – 3:30
8. "The Disappeared (Los Desaparacidos)" (Wally Page) – 3:19
9. "Ridin' the High Stool" (Christy Moore) – 3:04
10. "Gortatagort" (John Spillane) – 3:42
11. "I Will" (Dick Glasser) – 3:05
12. "John O'Dreams" (Bill Caddick) – 3:06
13. "Rory's Gone" (Christy Moore, Nigel Rolfe) – 3:39

== Personnel ==
- Christy Moore – vocals, guitar, bodhrán
- Declan Sinnott – guitalele, mandola, keyboards, banjo, vocals
- Eleanor Healy – bass, vocals
- Martin Leahy – drums, percussion
- Pat Crowley – accordion
- Neil Martin – cello
- Wally Page – vocals
