= King Puck (album) =

Studio album by Christy Moore
- Released: 1993
- Studio: Sulán Studios, Ballyvourney, County Cork
- Genre: Folk
- Label: Equator
- Producer: Christy Moore, Roger Askew, Walter Samuel

Christy Moore chronology
Smoke & Strong Whiskey (1991)	King Puck (1993)	Live at the Point (1994)

King Puck is an Irish folk music album by Christy Moore. It was dedicated to Neans De Paor (1919-1992).

== Track listing ==
1. "Before the Deluge" (Jackson Browne)
2. "The Two Conneeleys" (Christy Moore, Wally Page)
3. "Lawless" (M. Curry)
4. "Yellow Furze Woman" (Moore, Page)
5. "Giuseppe" (Moore, Jimmy Faulkner)
6. "Sodom & Begorra" (Moore)
7. "Johnny Connors" (Moore, Page)
8. "King Puck" (Moore, Page)
9. "Away Ye Broken Heart" (P. Stewart)
10. "Me and the Rose" (Moore)

== Personnel ==
- Christy Moore – vocals, guitar, bodhrán
- Jimmy Faulkner – guitar
- Neil McColl – guitar, mandolin
- Pat Crowley – accordion
- Chris Corrigan – fiddle
- Máire Breatnach – fiddle, viola
- Roger Askew – Hammond organ, piano
