= I Once Loved a Lass =

"I Once Loved a Lass" (Roud 154), also known in Scotland as "The False Bride", is a folk song of the British Isles. The age of the song is uncertain, but versions of it date at least as far back as the 1680s. Although widely believed to be a Scottish song, the earliest record of it is from Newcastle upon Tyne.

The song has been widely recorded since being popularised by Ewan MacColl. His rendition of the song began:

I once loved a lass and I loved her so well, I hated all others [that] spoke of her ill, [And] now she's rewarded me well for my love, She's gone to be wed to another

The song's theme is of unrequited love and some interpret the ending as implying death or suicide. Ewan MacColl wrote in the notes to his 1956 album Classic Scots Ballads:

Songs of jilted and forsaken lovers are common enough in Scotland but, for the most part, they tend to be ironical rather than pathetic in feeling. "There are plenty more fish in the sea" is the philosophy of our jilted heroes and heroines. In this curious little song, however, the jilted lover, after attending his ex-sweetheart's nuptials, just lies down and dies.

Although MacColl was born in England, his parents were Scottish and he was familiar with Scots dialect. His recording of the song was in attempted Scots. Some others have sung in a native variety of Scots, such as the recordings by the Clydesiders or Hannah Rarity.

There is also some sarcasm in the lyrics with the line "Now she's rewarded me well for my love" to describe the object of the narrator's love choosing another man to marry.

== Riddle ==
One verse in the song uses some imagery that many listeners struggle to interpret, referred to as "the oldest riddle in Britain".

The men of yon forest, they askit of me
How many strawberries grow in the salt sea?
I askit them back with a tear in my e'e*
How many ships sail through the forest?

- e'e is an eye dialect form of "eye", pronounced [i:], used in Scotland and the far north of England.

In Richard Farina's song "Birmingham Sunday", the verse is:

The men in the forest they once asked of me
How many blackberries grow in the salt sea?
I ask them right back with a tear in my eye
How many dark ships in the forest?

On Pete Seeger's album Live in '65, he asks the audience whether anyone knows the meaning of the verse. For her album that contained a recording of the song, Irish singer Karan Casey gave the name Ships in the Forest after this particular verse. An article in a Kelowna newspaper suggested that the strawberries refer to a Celtic clan who were known as "les gens de la fraise" (the people of the strawberry).
