= Folk Tale (album) =

Album by Christy Moore

Studio album by Christy Moore
- Released: 2011
- Genre: Folk
- Label: Sony Music
- Producer: Declan Sinnott

Christy Moore chronology
Listen (2009)	Folk Tale (2011)	Where I Come From (2013)

Folk Tale is an album by Irish folk singer Christy Moore, released in 2011 by Sony Music.

== Track listing ==
1. "Tyrone Boys" (Christy Moore)
2. "Folk Tale" (Paula Meehan (poem)/Christy Moore)
3. "My Little Honda 50" (Tom Tuohy)
4. "Easter Snow" (Moore)
5. "Farmer Michael Hayes" (Traditional; arranged by Christy Moore)
6. "On Morecambe Bay" (Kevin Littlewood)
7. "Tiles and Slabs" (Nigel Rolfe, Moore)
8. "Haiti" (John Spillane, Moore)
9. "Weekend in Amsterdam" (Paul McCormack, Barney Rush)
10. "Ballydine" (Moore)
11. "God Woman" (Moore)
