= This Is the Day (album) =

This is the Day

Studio album by Christy Moore
- Released: 2001
- Genre: Folk
- Label: Sony
- Producer: Declan Sinnott, Dónal Lunny

Christy Moore chronology
| Traveller (1999) | This is the Day (2001) | Live at Vicar Street (2002) |

This is the Day is an album released by Irish folk singer/songwriter Christy Moore in 2001.

It contains a tribute to Veronica Guerin, an Irish journalist who was murdered in 1996 by drug dealers. Moore also covers the song "Victor Jara", a tribute to the Chilean folk singer with lyrics by Adrian Mitchell and music by Arlo Guthrie. The song makes reference to the brutal murder of Jara during the Chilean coup of 1973.

== Track listing ==
1. "How Long" (Jackson Browne)
2. "So Do I" (Wally Page)
3. "Johnny Don't Go to Ballincollig" (John Spillane)
4. "Veronica" (Christy Moore, Declan Sinnott, Dónal Lunny)
5. "Jack Doyle" (aka "The Contender") (Jimmy McCarthy)
6. "Compañeros" (Ewan MacColl)
7. "Cry Like a Man" (Dan Penn)
8. "A Stitch in Time" (Mike Waterson)
9. "Victor Jara" (Adrian Mitchell, Arlo Guthrie)
10. "Scallcrows" (Moore, Sinnott, Lunny)
11. "The Pipers Path" (Chris Collins, Lal Waterson)

== Personnel ==
- Christy Moore - vocals, guitar
- Declan Sinnott - acoustic and electric guitar, percussion, backing vocals
- Dónal Lunny - bouzouki, bodhrán, keyboards, percussion, guitar, backing vocals

== Weekly charts ==
Weekly chart performance for This Is the Day
| Chart (2001) | Peak position |
|---|---|
| Irish Albums (IRMA) | 1 |

== Year-end charts ==
2001 year-end chart performance for This Is the Day
| Chart (2001) | Rank |
|---|---|
| Irish Albums (IRMA) | 11 |
