= Joxer Goes to Stuttgart =

Song by Christy Moore commemorating Ireland's soccer victory over England in 1988

Single by Christy Moore

from the album Live at the Point
- Released: 1989
- Recorded: 1989
- Genre: Novelty
- Length: 5:11
- Label: WEA Records
- Songwriter: Christy Moore

"Joxer Goes to Stuttgart" is a song by Irish folk singer Christy Moore. It is about a fan, named Joxer, who travels to the Republic of Ireland national football team's first major international tournament, Euro 1988, in West Germany. It is sung to the tune of the Match of the Day theme music, composed by Barry Stoller. "Joxer" or "Jockser" is, in working-class parts of Dublin, a hypocorism of "Jack" or "John."

The song is as much a comical social commentary on Ireland in the late 1980s as it is a celebration of the Irish team beating England at a major footballing tournament. The main focus of the song is the game that took place in Stuttgart's Neckarstadion against England on 12 June 1988, a game which Ireland won by a 1–0 scoreline, thanks to a sixth-minute goal from Ray Houghton. However, the song also documents the lives of those following the team and the impact of the tournament on Irish fans.

Some fans of the Irish football team later, more romantically than accurately, attributed the economic development that followed the success of the team in the tournament, and the 1990 World Cup two years later, to that very success itself along with the 'feel good' factor the performances of the side helped foster throughout the country.
