= Lily (Christy Moore album) =

Studio album by Christy Moore
- Released: 2016
- Genre: Folk
- Label: Sony

Christy Moore chronology
| Where I Come From (2013) | Lily (2016) | On the Road (2017) |

Lily is a studio album by Irish folk singer Christy Moore, released in 2016 by Sony Music.

== Track listing ==
1. "Mandolin Mountain" (Tony Small)
2. "The Tuam Beat" (Pádraig Stephens)
3. "The Gardener" (Paul Doran)
4. "Lily" (Christy Moore, Wally Page)
5. "Wallflower" (Peter Gabriel)
6. "Oblivious" (Mick Blake)
7. "The Ballad of Patrick Murphy" (John Spillane)
8. "Lightning Bird Wind River Man" (Declan O'Rourke)
9. "Green Grows the Laurel" (Traditional/Christy Moore)
10. "Lost Tribe of the Wicklow Mountains" (Christy Moore, Dave Lordan)

== Charts ==
| Chart (2016) | Peak position |
|---|---|
| Irish Albums (IRMA) | 3 |
