= Smoke & Strong Whiskey =

Studio album by Christy Moore
- Released: 1991
- Genre: Folk
- Label: Sony
- Producer: Avert Abbing, Walter Samuel

Christy Moore chronology
Voyage (1989)	Smoke & Strong Whiskey (1991)	King Puck (1993)

Professional ratings
Review scores
Source	Rating
AllMusic	link

Smoke & Strong Whiskey is an album by Irish folk singer Christy Moore, released in 1991.

== Track listing ==
1. "Welcome to the Cabaret" (Christy Moore) – 3:50
2. "Fairytale of New York" (Shane MacGowan, Jem Finer) – 3:55
3. "Scapegoats" (E. Cowan, Moore) – 2:45
4. "Aisling" (Shane MacGowan, Moore) – 3:20
5. "Burning Times" (Charlie M. Murphy) – 5:55
6. "Smoke & Strong Whiskey" (Wally Page, Tony Boylan, Moore) – 5:18
7. "Whacker Humphries" (Moore) – 3:30
8. "Blackjack County Chain" (Red Lane) – 2:45
9. "Green Island" (Ewan MacColl) – 3:55
10. "Encore" (Moore) – 3:50

== Personnel ==
- Christy Moore – vocal, backing vocals, harmonies, guitar, Bodhran
- Eoghan O'Neill – bass, acoustic guitar, backing vocals
- Noel Bridgeman – drums, percussion, backing vocals
- Declan Sinnott – electric guitar
- Roger Askew – organ, piano
- Jimmy Faulkner – guitar
- Pat Crowley – accordion
- Des Moore – acoustic and electric guitar
- Keith Donald – saxophone
- Davy Spillane – flute
- Eamon Cambell – acoustic guitar, banjo
- Carol Nelson – keyboards
- Sharon Shannon – accordion
- Carl Geraghty – saxophone
- Steve McDonagh – horn
- Avert Abbing – piano, keyboards
- Mattie Fox – backing vocals
