= Where I Come From =

Where I Come From may refer to:

- Where I Come From (New Riders of the Purple Sage album), 2009
- "Where I Come From" (Alan Jackson song), 2001
- Where I Come From (Christy Moore album), 2013
- "Where I Come From" (Montgomery Gentry song), 2011
