= Nomos (band) =

Irish folk band

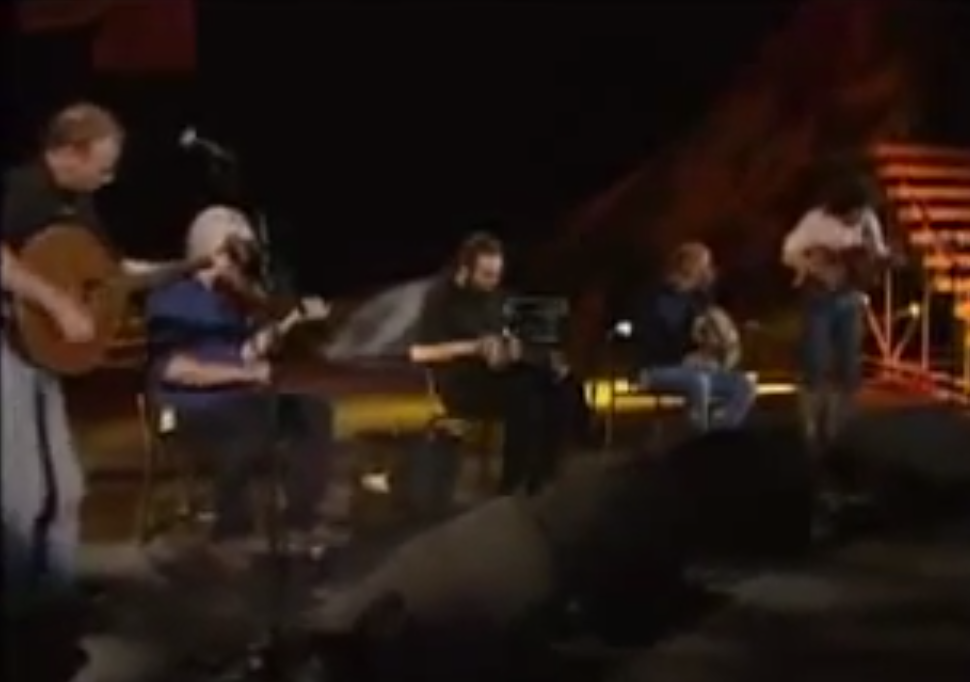

Background information
- Origin: University College Cork, Cork
- Genres: Folk
- Years active: 1990–2006
- Labels: Green Linnet
- Past members: Niall Vallely; John Spillane; Liz Doherty; Vince Milne; Frank Torpey; Gerry McKee; Eoin Coughlan

Nomos were an Irish traditional music band during the 1990s from Cork. The group formed in 1990 and consisted of Niall Vallely on concertina, Vince Milne on fiddle, Frank Torpey on bodhran, Gerry McKee on bouzouki, and Eoin Coughlan on vocals and bass. They have been described as one of the "most popular Irish bands of the 1990s," and as "one of the more innovative and fiery Irish traditional bands".

== History ==
Originally, the group included Liz Doherty on fiddle and John Spillane on vocals and guitar. Doherty and Spillane formed Nomos with Vallely, Torpey, and McKee at University College Cork. The band followed a musical path begun by artists such as The Chieftains, Clannad, Planxty, Altan, Natalie McMaster, and Eileen Ivers. Torpey hails from Wexford, while McKee was born in Lisburn.

== Style ==
The group's sound was centered on Vallely's concertina playing and Milne's fiddling. Milne's contributions displayed both his West Cork heritage and his affinity for bluegrass. Vallely, of Armagh, also composed and played the low whistle. The rhythm contributions of Coughlan have been compared to Planxty and the Bothy Band, and the bassist/vocalist also writes some of the group's songs.

== Discography ==
=== Albums ===
- I Won't Be Afraid Anymore (1996)
- Set You Free (1997)
