= The People's Own MP =

"The People's Own MP" is an Irish rebel song about Bobby Sands, one of the Irish hunger strikers.

The song was written by Bruce Scott and recorded by Christy Moore on the latter's 1984 EP Back Home in Derry and his 1986 album, The Spirit of Freedom. It has been described as an example of the "hero-martyr" genre of rebel music in which the "intellectual, artistic and moral qualities" of the subject are eulogised beyond courage.
