= Graffiti Tongue =

Studio album by Christy Moore
- Released: 1996
- Genre: Irish folk
- Label: Grapevine
- Producer: Christy Moore

Christy Moore chronology
Live at the Point (1994)	Graffiti Tongue (1996)	Traveller (1999)

Graffiti Tongue is a solo album by Irish folk singer Christy Moore. It was released in 1996.

== Track listing ==
1. "Yellow Triangle"
2. "God Woman"
3. "Minds Locked Shut"
4. "Folk Tale"
5. "Riding the High Stool"
6. "Tiles and Slabs"
7. "Strange Ways"
8. "On the Mainland"
9. "Boning Halls"
10. "Miracles of Nature"
11. "North and South of the River"
12. "Rory Is Gone"

== Personnel ==
- Christy Moore – guitar, bodhran, vocals
