= The Spirit of Freedom =

Studio album by Christy Moore
- Released: 1986
- Recorded: Dublin
- Genre: Folk
- Label: WEA Ireland
- Producer: Christy Moore

Christy Moore chronology
Ordinary Man (1985)	The Spirit of Freedom (1986)	Unfinished Revolution (1987)

The Spirit of Freedom is an Irish folk music album by Christy Moore. The album is notable for featuring two songs written by Provisional IRA member Bobby Sands. The songs "Back Home in Derry" and "McIlhatton" were written by Sands while in prison at Long Kesh.

== Track listing ==
1. "Forever On My Mind" (Pearse McLoughlin; arranged by Christy Moore)
2. "No Time for Love" (Jack Warshaw)
3. "The People's Own MP" (Bruce Scott)
4. "Deportee" (Woody Guthrie)
5. "Michael Gaughan" (Anonymous)
6. "Grannies Dustbin Lid" (Joe Mulhearn)
7. "Dying Soldier" (Ger Costello)
8. "Boy from Tamlaghtduff" (Christy Moore)
9. "McIlhatton" (Bobby Sands)
10. "Jesus Christ & Jessie James" (Brian Whoriskey)
11. "Galtee Mountain Boy" (Christy Moore, Patsy Halloran)
12. "Back Home in Derry" (music: Gordon Lightfoot; lyrics: Bobby Sands)
