= Live at Vicar Street =

Live at Vicar Street may refer to:

- Live at Vicar Street (The Dubliners album)
- Live at Vicar Street (Christy Moore album)
