= Foggy Dew =

Foggy Dew may refer to:

- "Foggy Dew" (English song), an English folk song
- “The Foggy Dew" (Irish songs), the name of several Irish ballads
- The Foggy Dew (album), an album by The Wolfe Tones

== See also ==
- Dew
- Fog
