= H-block =

H-block or h-block may refer to:

- Maze (HM Prison), Belfast, where the prison blocks were built to a uniform H-shaped plan
  - Anti H-Block, 1981 Irish Republican election label
  - H Block, a compilation album by various Irish folk artists
- H Block (Hong Kong), a 1970s block design in Hong Kong
- H engine, an internal combustion engine having the cylinders in an H pattern
- H-block in aggressive inline skating, part of the frame of the skate
- The 1915–1920 and 1995–2000 MHz radio frequency bands, used for wireless broadband communications; see Advanced Wireless Services § Changes

== See also ==
- H-Blockx, German hardcore punk band
