= Burning times =

Burning times may refer to:

- In neopaganism, a term for the Witch trials in the Early Modern period
- The Burning Times, a 1990 documentary about the Early Modern European witchcraft trials
- Burning Times (album), an album by Christy Moore
- "Burning Times", a song by Iced Earth from the album Something Wicked This Way Comes
- "Burning Times", a song by Inkubus Sukkubus from the album Wytches
- "The Burning Times", a song by Testament from the album Demonic
