= Live at Vicar Street (Christy Moore album) =

Live album by Christy Moore
- Released: 2002
- Venue: Vicar Street, Dublin
- Genre: Folk
- Label: Columbia
- Producer: Christy Moore, Declan Sinnott

Christy Moore chronology
This Is The Day (2001)	Live at Vicar Street (2002)	Burning Times (2005)

Live at Vicar Street is a live album released by Irish folk singer/songwriter Christy Moore in 2002.

The live album features Christy Moore, alongside other Irish musicians such as Declan Sinnott and Dónal Lunny, playing a live set at Dublin's Vicar Street venue.

== Track listing ==
1. "Continental Céilidh" (Johnny Mulhern)
2. "First Time Ever" (Ewan MacColl)
3. "A Pair of Brown Eyes" (Shane MacGowan)
4. "Biko Drum" (Wally Page)
5. "Quiet Desperation" (Floyd Westerman)
6. "McIlhatton" (Bobby Sands)
7. "January Man" (Dave Goulder)
8. "Allende"
9. "Johnny Don't Go" (John Spillane)
10. "Wandering Aongus" (William Butler Yeats)
11. "Lisdoonvarna" (Christy Moore)
12. "Ride On" (Jimmy McCarthy)
13. "Tribute to Noel Brazil"
14. "Metropolitan Avenue" (Noel Brazil)

== Personnel ==
- Christy Moore - vocals, guitar, bodhrán
- Declan Sinnott - guitar, backing vocals
- Dónal Lunny - keyboards, bodhrán, backing vocals
