= Whatever Tickles Your Fancy =

1975 album by Irish folk musician Christy Moore

Studio album by Christy Moore
- Released: 1975
- Studio: Ashling Studio, Rathgar
- Genre: Folk
- Length: 38:56
- Label: Polydor
- Producer: Dónal Lunny

Christy Moore chronology
| Prosperous (1972) | Whatever Tickles Your Fancy (1975) | Christy Moore (1976) |

Whatever Tickles Your Fancy is the third solo album by Irish folk musician Christy Moore, released in 1975.

Since his last album Prosperous in 1972, Christy had recorded three albums with Planxty. He left Planxty soon after, only to realise he had no profile as a solo artist in Ireland. Through playing with Jimmy Faulkner, Declan McNelis, and later Kevin Burke, they soon started to form the basis for an album recording.

The album was recorded in Ashling Studios in Rathgar.

== Track listing ==
All tracks are Traditional compositions, arranged by Christy Moore; except where indicated

1. "Home by Barna"
2. "January Man" (Dave Goulder)
3. "The Moving on Song (Go! Move! Shift!)" (Ewan MacColl)
4. "Bunch of Thyme"
5. "Tippin' it Up to Nancy"
6. "The Ballad of Timothy Evans" (Ewan MacColl, Peggy Seeger)
7. "Who Put the Blood"
8. "One Last Cold Kiss" (Felix Pappalardi, Gail Collins)
9. "Trip to Roscoff" (Christy Moore)
10. "Van Diemen's Land" (Traditional; arranged by Christy Moore and Dónal Lunny)

== Personnel ==
- Christy Moore – vocals, guitar, sleeve design
- Jimmy Faulkner – electric and acoustic guitars
- Dónal Lunny – guitar, bouzouki, bodhrán, Moog synthesizer, vocals
- Declan McNelis – bass
- Kevin Burke – fiddle
- Robbie Brennan – drums
