= Live at the Point (2006 Christy Moore album) =

Live album by Christy Moore
- Released: 2006
- Recorded: Live at the Point Depot, Dublin, December 2005 and January 2006
- Genre: Folk
- Length: 131:00
- Label: Columbia

Christy Moore chronology
Burning Times (2005)	Live at the Point (2006)	Listen (2009)

Live at the Point (2006) is the fourth live album from Irish singer-songwriter Christy Moore. This two-CD set contains music from concerts at the Point Depot in Dublin on 29 December 2005, 30 December 2005, 5 January 2006, and 6 January 2006. The album features Declan Sinnott on guitar. There is a DVD, Christy Moore Live in Dublin 2006, containing the songs from the first CD.

== Track listing ==
=== Disc one ===
1. "One Last Cold Kiss (a.k.a. Two Island swans)"
2. "North and South (Of the River)"
3. "So Do I"
4. "The Lonesome Death of Hattie Carroll"
5. "Motherland"
6. "Wise and Holy Woman"
7. "Casey"
8. "The Magdalene Laundries"
9. "Missing You"
10. "Beeswing"
11. "Smoke and Strong Whiskey"
12. "America, You Are Not the World"
13. "Natives"
14. "Quiet Desperation"
15. "Ordinary Man"
16. "Ride On"
17. "Viva la Quinta Brigada"
18. "Jack Doyle (a.k.a. The Contender)"
19. "City of Chicago"
20. "Victor Jara"

=== Disc two ===
1. "The Two Conneeleys"
2. "Yellow Triangle"
3. "Strangeways"
4. "Faithful Departed"
5. "Sacco & Vanzetti"
6. "Sonny's Dream"
7. "Stitch in Time"
8. "Veronica"
9. "Corrina Corrina" (Declan Sinnot vocals)
10. "Butterfly (a.k.a. So Much Wine)"
11. "Sixteen Fisherman Raving"
12. "Mercy"
13. "Cry Like a Man"
14. "Hiroshima Nagasaki Russian Roulette"
15. "Bright Blue Rose"
