= Burning Times (album) =

Studio album by Christy Moore
- Released: 2005
- Recorded: 2005
- Genre: Folk
- Label: Sony International
- Producer: Declan Sinnott

Christy Moore chronology
Live at Vicar Street (2002)	Burning Times (2005)	Live at the Point (2006)

Burning Times is an album by Irish folk singer Christy Moore. The album is dedicated to Rachel Corrie, an American activist killed by an Israeli bulldozer in Gaza in 2003.

== Track listing ==
1. "16 Fishermen Raving" (Wally Page, Tony Boylan)
2. "Motherland" (Natalie Merchant)
3. "Butterfly (So Much Wine)" (Brett Sparks, Rennie Sparks)
4. "Magic Nights in the Lobby Bar" (John Spillane, Ger Wolfe, Ricky Lynch)
5. "America, I Love You" (Morrissey)
6. "Mercy" (Wally Page)
7. "Beeswing" (Richard Thompson)
8. "The Lonesome Death of Hattie Carroll" (Bob Dylan)
9. "The Magdalene Laundries" (Joni Mitchell)
10. "Burning Times" (Charlie Murphy)
11. "Peace in the Valley Once Again" (Brett Sparks, Rennie Sparks)
12. "Changes" (Phil Ochs)

== Personnel ==
- Christy Moore - vocals, guitar, bodhrán
- Declan Sinnott - guitar, background vocals
- Mandy Murphy, Mary Greene - background vocals
