= Live at the Point (1994 Christy Moore album) =

Live album by Christy Moore
- Released: 1994
- Recorded: Point Theatre, Dublin; 1994
- Genre: Irish folk
- Label: Grapevine
- Producer: Christy Moore

Christy Moore chronology
The Christy Moore Collection 1981–1991 (1991)	Live at the Point (1994)	Graffiti Tongue (1996)

Live at the Point is a live album by Irish folk singer Christy Moore, released in 1994. The album was recorded at the Point Theatre in Dublin over a course of a number of concerts in 1994.

Reminiscing on the concerts, Moore himself comments on his website: "I played to 50,000 over 12 nights. Me and my guitar. Weird. I’d be totally fucked after it. The cigar smoke was getting to me a bit. Some of the backroom boys were startin’ to lose the plot and believe their own publicity. I was believin’ in False Gods and that is bothersome and dangerous..."

== Track listing ==
All tracks arranged and composed by Christy Moore; except where indicated

1. "Welcome to the Cabaret"
2. "Natives" (Paul Doran)
3. "Fairytale of New York" (Shane MacGowan, Jem Finer)
4. "Delirium Tremens"
5. "Black Is the Colour" (Traditional)
6. "Missing You" (Jim McCarthy)
7. "Cliffs of Dooneen" (Traditional)
8. "Well Below the Valley"
9. "Go, Move, Shift" (Ewan McColl)
10. "Casey" (Martin Egan)
11. "Ride On" (Jim McCarthy)
12. "Knock"
13. "Joxer Goes to Stuttgart"
14. "Nancy Spain" (Barney Rush)

== Personnel ==
- Christy Moore – guitar, bodhran, vocals

== Reception ==
Professional ratings
Review scores
Source	Rating
Allmusic	4.5/5 stars

The album received positive reviews and a 4.5 stars out of 5 rating on Allmusic.
