= Christy Moore (album) =

Album by Christy Moore

Studio album by Christy Moore
- Released: 1976
- Recorded: Dublin Sound Studios; Eamon Andrews Studios
- Genre: Folk
- Length: 38:11
- Label: Polydor
- Producer: Dónal Lunny, Nicky Ryan

Christy Moore chronology
Whatever Tickles Your Fancy (1975)	Christy Moore (1976)	The Iron Behind the Velvet (1978)

Christy Moore is the fourth solo album by Irish folk musician Christy Moore, released in 1976.

All tracks were produced by Dónal Lunny and recorded at Dublin Sound Studios, except "Nancy Spain" which was produced by Nicky Ryan in Eamon Andrews Studios.

== Track listing ==
1. "The Dalesman's Litany" – 4:03
2. "Galtee Mountain Boy" – :3:37
3. "Little Musgrave" – 6:34
4. "Wave Up to the Shore" – 2:45
5. "Nancy Spain" – 3:32
6. "Lanigans Ball" – 3:16
7. "Johnny Jump Up" – 2:53
8. "Scriff Martyrs" – 5:56
9. "Limerick Rake" – 3:01
10. "Boys of Mullabawn" – 4:19
11. "Sacco & Vanzetti" – 4:37

== Personnel ==
- Christy Moore – vocals, bodhrán
- Dónal Lunny – producer, bouzouki, guitar, vocals
- Declan McNeilis, Jimmy Faulkner – guitar
- Andy Irvine – mandolin
- Kevin Burke – fiddle
- Barney McKenna – banjo
- Jeff Whittaker, Lord Eric – African drums
- Nicky Ryan – producer on "Nancy Spain"
