= Ships in the Forest =

Studio album by Karan Casey
- Released: 2008
- Recorded: 2008
- Genre: Irish traditional Celtic; Indie
- Length: 46:00
- Label: Crow Valley Music; Compass
- Producer: Donald Shaw

Ships in the Forest is a studio album by Irish traditional singer Karan Casey, and the first to be released primarily on her own label. The album features much of Casey's live band, as well as her brother-in-law and husband, both members of the band Buille. The album features one song in Irish and many Irish traditional songs. There is also a song by Joni Mitchell.

The album's title is a reference to the last track, the traditional Scots song I Once Loved a Lass, which includes an enigmatic verse that asks "how many ships sail through the forest?"

== Track listing ==
1. "Love Is Pleasing"
2. "Dunlavin Green"
3. "Johnny I Hardly Knew Ye"
4. "Black Is The Colour"
5. "Town of Athlone"
6. "Maidin Luan Chincíse"
7. "The Fiddle and the Drum" (Joni Mitchell)
8. "Erin's Lovely Home"
9. "Ae Fond Kiss"
10. "I Once Loved a Lass"
