= Go on home, British soldiers =

Irish republican song

Song by The Wolfe Tones
- Written: 30 January 1972
- Genre: Irish rebel song, protest song
- Lyricist: Tommy Skelly

"Go on home, British soldiers" is an Irish rebel song from the time of the Troubles. Written in protest against the Bloody Sunday massacre in 1972, it became an anthem of Irish nationalism, with its lyrics portraying an eight-hundred-year long conflict against British imperialism. The song's support for the Provisional IRA has also contributed to it being used to express political sectarianism and generalised anti-British sentiment.

== Background ==
With the beginning of The Troubles, in January 1972, the government of Northern Ireland led by Brian Faulkner banned all political demonstrations by the Irish civil rights movement. In protest, the Northern Ireland Civil Rights Association (NICRA) organised a demonstration in Derry on Sunday, 30 January, and led more than 10,000 people in a march through the city. Despite the organisers' attempts to keep the event peaceful, some demonstrators began to clash with British troops. Soldiers of the 1st Parchute Regiment shot and killed 13 people and wounded another dozen people, in a massacre that came to be known as "Bloody Sunday". According to the report by the Bloody Sunday Inquiry, none of the people who had been killed or wounded had posed a threat to the soldiers. The massacre galvanised the Irish nationalist and republican movements, strengthened the position of the Provisional Irish Republican Army with a surge in new recruits, and inspired a new wave of Irish rebel songs.

== Composition ==
Only two hours after the Bloody Sunday massacre, Irish songwriter Tommy Skelly composed the song "Go on home, British soldiers", in protest against the actions of the British paratroopers. He had been at band practice that day and, when he heard the news on the radio, he exclaimed "you should go home you bastards, have you got no homes of your own?" He then turned his outburst into lyrics.

== Analysis ==
The song's narrative constructs a continuous timeline of 800 years of imperial aggression against Ireland, from the Anglo-Norman invasion in the 12th century, through the Tudor conquests in the 16th century, to the continuation of British rule in Northern Ireland into the 20th century. According to ethnomusicologist Stephen R. Millar, the song's narrative forces listeners "to experience Ireland's invasion synchronically". Its lyrics are intended to intensify listeners' Irish nationalist and anti-British sentiments. and encourage them to resist the British state. Millar believed that the song reduced the history of these conflicts to two opposing camps: "British oppressors and Irish freedom fighters". The song also exalts the Provisional IRA, which at the time was a designated terrorist group. Meaghan Kelly criticised the song for "perpetuat[ing] divisions in Northern Irish society" and ignoring "the harm caused by the IRA".

== Performances ==
The song was popularised by the Irish republican band The Wolfe Tones, which has long performed the song and is closely associated with it. Several versions of the song have since been performed and released by various Irish bands and artists. The song has since become an anthem of Irish republicanism. It is also a part of the fan culture of Celtic F.C., where it has contributed to expressions of political sectarianism in football. Some Celtic supporters' clubs have banned the song, worrying that its sectarian themes might offend and alienate other potential fans.

At a music festival in Ardoyne in 2014, the Irish republican band The Druids ended their set with a performance of "Go on home, British soldiers". They began the song with a call for the expulsion of both British troops and loyalists from Northern Ireland, accompanied by a riff usually set to the lyrics "get the Brits out now"; all of it could be heard by the nearby loyalist community. The comments caused substantial controversy, receiving attention from British, Irish and American news, and provoking death threats against the band members. According to the band's singer, Mick O'Brien, the band had been attacked by loyalists at a nearby housing estate before the concert, which he said motivated the sectarian comments, although he later expressed regret for them.

Following the Russian invasion of Ukraine in 2022, the Ukrainian Celtic group The Shamrocks performed a version of the song entitled "Go on home, Russian soldiers", drawing a connection between anti-imperialist movements in Ireland and Ukraine.

== See also ==
- Sunday Bloody Sunday – 1983 song by U2
- Give Ireland Back to the Irish
- The Luck of the Irish (song)

== Bibliography ==
- Burns, Eva (2023). "Religious Retribution through Football in Scotland". Groundings Undergraduate Journal. 14: 19–28. doi:10.36399/GroundingsUG.14.134.
- Frenett, Ross; Smith, M. L. R. (2012). "IRA 2.0: Continuing the long War—Analyzing the factors behind anti-GFA violence". Terrorism and Political Violence. 24 (3): 375–395. doi:10.1080/09546553.2011.624862.
- Giulianotti, Richard; Robertson, Roland (2006). "Glocalization, globalization and migration: The case of Scottish football supporters in North America". International Sociology. 21 (2): 171–198. doi:10.1177/0268580906061374.
- Lefèvre, Anna (2024). "Confronting identifications: Ukrainian-Polish relations of power from an Irish perspective since the XIXth century". Вісник Черкаського університету (2): 8–17. doi:10.31651/2076-5908-2024-2-8-17.
- Kelley, Meaghan; Geil, Lillie (2 June 2023). "Nationalist Ideological Canon as Expressed Through Music". War & Peace in Northern Ireland. Carleton College.
- Millar, Stephen R. (2016). "Irish Republican Music and (Post)colonial Schizophrenia". Popular Music and Society. 40 (1): 75–88. doi:10.1080/03007766.2016.1229098.
