= Unfinished Revolution (album) =

1987 album by Christy Moore

Studio album by Christy Moore
- Released: 1987
- Recorded: Dublin
- Genre: Folk
- Label: WEA Ireland
- Producer: Christy Moore, Dónal Lunny

Christy Moore chronology
The Spirit of Freedom (1986)	Unfinished Revolution (1987)	Voyage (1989)

Unfinished Revolution is a 1987 Irish folk music album by Christy Moore. The album was released the same year as the Remembrance Day bombing in Enniskillen, an event Moore described as changing his viewpoint on Irish Republicanism. The album title refers to Moore's long-time support of Irish unification.

== Track listing ==
1. "Biko Drum" (Wally Page)
2. "Natives" (Paul Doran)
3. "Metropolitan Avenue" (Noel Brazil)
4. "Unfinished Revolution" (Peter Cadle)
5. "The Other Side" (Christy Moore)
6. "Messenger Boy" (Christie Hennessy)
7. "On the Bridge" (Christy Moore)
8. "Suffocate" (Noel Brazil)
9. "Derby Day" (Music: Paul Doran)
10. "Dr. Vibes" (Declan Sinnott)
11. "A Pair of Brown Eyes" (Shane MacGowan)
