= Christy Moore and Friends =

Album by Christy Moore and others

Studio album by Various
- Released: 1981
- Recorded: Dublin
- Genre: Folk
- Label: RTÉ
- Producer: Christy Moore

Various chronology
H Block (1980)	Christy Moore and Friends (1981)	The Time Has Come (1983)

Christy Moore and Friends is an album produced by RTÉ and Christy Moore, which contained recordings by various Irish musicians, namely Stockton's Wing, Mary Black and Christy's former band Planxty.

Christy had produced a similar album a year earlier, 1980's H Block, which contained songs of a political matter.

== Track listing ==
1. "John O'Dreams" (Christy Moore)
2. "The Maid Behind The Bar" (Stockton's Wing)
3. "Trip to Jerusalem" (Christy Moore)
4. "Streets of London" (Ralph McTell)
5. "Patrick Was a Gentleman" (Christy Moore)
6. "East of Glendart" (Planxty)
7. "The Good Ship Kangaroo" (Planxty)
8. "From Clare to Here" (Ralph McTell)
9. "Sonny Brogan's" (Stockton's Wing)
10. "Anachie Gordon" (Mary Black)
11. "Cliffs of Dooneen" (Christy Moore)
12. "The Crack Was Ninety in the Isle of Man" (Christy Moore)
