= Paddy on the Road =

Album by Christy Moore

Studio album by Christy Moore
- Released: 1969
- Recorded: 1969
- Studio: Sound Techniques Chelsea, London
- Genre: Folk
- Length: 38:56
- Label: Mercury
- Producer: Dominic Behan, Harold Shampan

Christy Moore chronology
Paddy on the Road (1969)	Prosperous (1972)

Paddy on the Road is the debut album by Irish folk musician Christy Moore, released in 1969. The album was produced and co-written by Dominic Behan. Steve Benbow organised the backing musicians and was responsible for the arrangements and conducting.

Although issued on a major label, Mercury Records, only 500 copies were pressed of the original 1969 issue.

The song "Marrow Bones" is also known as "Tippin' It Up (to Nancy)".

Christy Moore has printed up a limited number of CD copies that, as of October 2010, are for sale at his gigs and his website.

In 2016, the album was re-released on vinyl for Record Store Day in the UK and Ireland, however the recording of this LP appears to be identical to the CD copy, which was a poor, non studio quality transcription of an original 1969 vinyl source and not from a master recording.

Professional ratings
Review scores
Source	Rating
Allmusic	3.5/5 stars

== Track listing ==
1. "Paddy on the Road" (Dominic Behan) – 3:35
2. "Marrow Bones" – 2:13
3. "Strike Weapon" (Dominic Behan) – 2:40
4. "Avondale" (Dominic Behan) – 2:46
5. "James Larkin" – 2:54
6. "Cúnla" – 1:54
7. "Spanish Lady" – 3:00
8. "Belfast Brigade" (Dominic Behan) – 2:02
9. "Cricklewood" (John B. Keane) – 2:05
10. "Curragh of Kildare" – 3:53
11. "Maid from Athy" – 1:07
12. "Father McFadden" – 2:20
