= Voyage (Christy Moore album) =

Studio album by Christy Moore
- Released: 1989
- Recorded: Dublin
- Genre: Folk
- Label: WEA Ireland
- Producer: Christy Moore

Christy Moore chronology
Unfinished Revolution (1987)	Voyage (1989)	Smoke and Strong Whiskey (1991)

Professional ratings
Review scores
Source	Rating
Hi-Fi News & Record Review	A:1

Voyage is an Irish folk music album by Christy Moore. The album features songs of a political nature, however unlike Moore's past releases, the subjects are not limited to Ireland-specific issues. Sinéad O'Connor sings "Middle of the Island" with Moore.

== Track listing ==
No.	Title	Writer(s)	Length
1.	"Mystic Lipstick"	Jimmy McCarthy	4:02
2.	"The Voyage"	Johnny Duhan	3:51
3.	"The Mad Lady & Me"	Jimmy McCarthy	3:05
4.	"The Deportees Club"	Elvis Costello	4:29
5.	"The Night Visit"	Traditional, Christy Moore	3:22
6.	"All For The Roses"	Tony Boylan, Wally Page	3:57
7.	"Missing You"	Jimmy McCarthy	3:48
8.	"Bright Blue Rose"	Jimmy McCarthy	4:50
9.	"Farewell to Pripyat"	Tim Dennehy	4:37
10.	"Musha God Help Her"	Pierce Turner	3:59
11.	"The First Time Ever I Saw Your Face"	Ewan MacColl	4:17
12.	"Middle of the Island"	Christy Moore, Nigel Rolfe	4:08
