= Liz Doherty =

Irish fiddle player, academic and performer

Liz Doherty'
- Born: c. 1970; Buncranna
- Education: University College Cork (BMus); University of Limerick (PhD)
- Known for: Traditional Irish music

Liz Doherty is an Irish fiddler based in County Donegal who also recorded and toured with both Nomos and The Bumblebees as well as alone.

== Biography ==
Liz Doherty was born in Buncrana, County Donegal, Ireland in 1970, the oldest daughter of four girls. Although she was born and raised in the vibrant musical county of Donegal, she hadn't seriously been interested in Irish music performance (despite learning Irish traditional music and dance from a young age); it wasn't until 1987, when she went to Glencolmcille's Fiddle Week, through Cairdeas na bhFeidléirí (lit., "friendship of fiddlers"), that she fell in love with the tradition, its music and the types of expression that are possible within the style.

Liz eventually moved to Cork to attend University College Cork, and graduated from there with a BMus in 1991 after studying under the late Professor Mícheál Ó Súilleabháin. She took on a role as an Irish Traditional Music lecturer at UCC in 1994, where she taught until 2001. Doherty has been a visiting lecturer in Cape Breton University, Nova Scotia, Canada as well as Marshall University, West Virginia, USA. Her 1996 PhD from the University of Limerick was on the fiddle traditions of Cape Breton Island, Nova Scotia.

Around the early 2000s, Doherty took time away from academia to record her own music projects and tour. She was a founding member of the Irish music band Nomos, as well as forming a group of fiddlers from UCC's Music Department, better known as Fiddlesticks. She has recorded albums with a number of groups, plus two solo albums: Quare Imagination (2002) and Last Orders (2005), both featuring thoughtfully-arranged medleys of tunes composed by Doherty herself as well as other musicians, plus many traditional tunes of Ireland and her native Donegal. Additionally, the albums feature several tunes of Scottish and/or Cape Breton origin, which (due to Scotland's proximity to and history with the north of Ireland) tend to be most well known amongst Donegal and Ulster musicians; this unique regional repertoire (an eclectic mix of Irish, Scottish, and Cape Breton tunes), though varying from musician to musician, is one of the main features of the general northern "style" of music.

Later in the 2000s saw Doherty returning to academia at the University of Ulster. She is a member of the Culture Ireland Expert Advisory Committee. In 2013 Doherty was involved with the TG4 TV show Glaoch An Cheoil.
