= The Galway Races (song) =

Irish traditional song

"The Galway Races" is a traditional Irish song. The song's narrator is attending the eponymous annual event in Galway, a city in the west of Ireland. The song was made famous in the UK in 1967 by The Dubliners.

== Recordings ==
"The Galway Races" has been recorded by a variety of artists, including:

- Jim McCann on the album The Craic Is 90
- Liam Clancy on the album Liam Clancy
- The Clancy Brothers on the albums Isn't It Grand Boys and Wrap the Green Flag
- Tommy Makem and Liam Clancy on the album Live at the National Concert Hall
- The Dubliners, on multiple albums
- The Wolfe Tones, on The Foggy Dew (1965)
- Paddy Reilly, on multiple albums
- The Chieftains, on the 1986 album Ballad of the Irish Horse, and by Kevin Conneff on the 1991 live recording An Irish Evening
- The Pogues on the 1986 album If I Should Fall From Grace With God
- Todd Menton on the album Punts (2003)
- Patrick Clifford on the 2010 album American Wake
- The High Kings on the 2020 album Home from Home
