= The Foggy Dew (album) =

Studio album by The Wolfe Tones
- Released: 1965
- Genre: Irish folk
- Label: Fontana Records

The Wolfe Tones chronology
| The Foggy Dew (1965) | Up the Rebels (1966) |

The Foggy Dew is the debut album by Irish folk and rebel band The Wolfe Tones. The album is named after and features the song of the same name.

== Track listing ==
1. "The Singing Bird"
2. "Down in the Mines"
3. "Dicey Reilly"
4. "Galway Races"
5. "Louse House In Killkenny"
6. "The Diamond"
7. "The Zoological Gardens"
8. "The Foggy Dew"
9. "The Peeler and the Goat
10. "The Sash"
11. "Limerick Rake"
12. "Dry Land Sailors"
13. "Follow Me Up to Carlow"
14. "The Hills of Glenswilly"
15. "The Boys of Wexford"
16. "Roisin Dubh
