= Kevin Barry (song) =

Irish rebel song

Song
- Written: November/December 1920
- Genre: Irish rebel song, Irish traditional
- Composers: Traditional, based on "Rolling Home to Dear Old Ireland"
- Lyricist: Unknown

"Kevin Barry" is a popular Irish republican song recounting the death of Kevin Barry, a member of the Irish Republican Army (IRA) who was hanged on 1 November 1920. He was 18 years old at the time. He is one of a group of IRA members executed in 1920–21 collectively known as The Forgotten Ten.

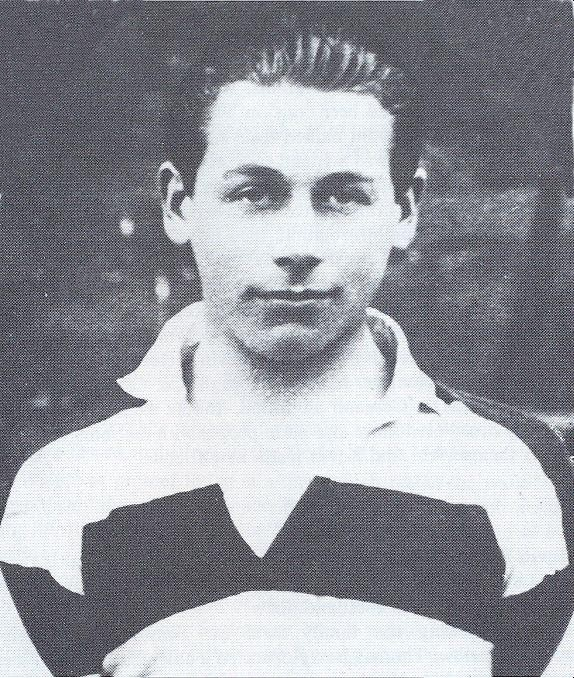
Portrait of Barry

The ballad was penned shortly after his death by an author whose identity is unknown. Barry's family investigated this in the 1920s, but were only told it was the work of an Irish emigrant living in Glasgow. Some sources claim that it was written by Terrence Ward, a journalist, but this is incorrect: he actually wrote another song about Barry. It is sung to the melody of "Rolling Home to Dear Old Ireland" (also known as "Rolling Home to" several other places).

It has been performed by many Irish groups including The Wolfe Tones and The Clancy Brothers. The American singer Paul Robeson included it in this album Songs of Struggle, although this version tones down the anti-British sentiment of the original. On at least one occasion, in 1972, Leonard Cohen covered the song in concert.

The song has been one of the most enduringly popular of Irish songs and has been largely responsible for making Kevin Barry a household name. It was said to be so popular with British troops during the Troubles that it was banned. It was one of many Irish rebel ballads removed from RTÉ playlists during the period of the conflict in Northern Ireland.

"Kevin Barry" featured prominently in Frank McCourt's memoir Angela's Ashes, and in the 1999 movie adaptation of the book.
