= Knockanure =

Knockanure Cnoc an Iúir
- Civil parish
- Location in Ireland
- Coordinates: 52.4624°N 9.3710°W
- Country: Ireland
- Province: Munster
- County: County Kerry

Knockanure (Irish: Cnoc an Iúir) is a civil parish in County Kerry, Ireland. It is near the town of Listowel and the village of Moyvane.

== Amenities ==
Knockanure parish contains a Catholic church, the Church of Corpus Christi, which was built in 1964. Scoil Chorp Chríost is the primary school in Knockanure. There is a pub called Flynn's Bar.

Population centres within Knockanure civil parish include Kilmorna (Irish: Coill Mhaonaigh). Kilmorna House, a former country house historically associated with the Vicars and Mahony families, was burned during the Irish War of Independence in April 1921.

== People ==
- Dan Keane (1919–2012), poet
- Maureen Flavin Sweeney (1923–2023), postmistress involved in weather forecasting for Operation Overlord

== See also ==
- The Valley of Knockanure
