= Jami Sieber =

American cellist, vocalist and composer (born 1957)

- Born: Jami Sieber
- Genres: New-age, world
- Occupations: Musician, composer
- Instruments: Acoustic and electric cello
- Years active: 1994–present
- Label: Out Front Music
- Website: jamisieber.com

Jami Sieber is an American cellist, vocalist and composer. She has received several positive reviews for her work. She plays acoustic cello and electric cello.

Sieber began to learn the cello at age seven. Growing up in classical music she played as part of the cello section of Greater Twin Cities Youth Symphony (GTCYS) in Minneapolis. She moved to Seattle in 1977 and then met Charlie Murphy in 1979. They began touring as a folk duo for five years before evolving into a full-scale progressive rock band: Rumors of the Big Wave. She later left the progressive rock band and instead became a solo artist, producing six independent albums, four of which she has made available at Magnatune. Several of her pieces can be heard in the video game Braid. She has composed for dance (Llory Wilsom and Tallulah Dance Co, Jeff Bickford, The Equus Projects), film (Big Joy, 2012; Queen of the Sun, 2010), and theatre (TS Crossing).

== Discography ==
- 1994 – Lush Mechanique
- 1998 – Second Sight
- 2004 – Hidden Sky
- 2007 – Only Breath
- 2008 – Unspoken: The Music of Only Breath
- 2011 – Queen of the Sun: The Official Soundtrack
- 2013 – Timeless
