= Dunlavin Green =

Irish ballad about the 1798 rebellion

Song
- Genre: Irish folk
- Songwriter(s): Traditional

Dunlavin Green is an Irish ballad referring to the Dunlavin Green executions in 1798 of 36 suspected rebels.

== Notable recordings ==
- 1956 – Patrick Galvin – Irish Songs of Resistance Part I
- 1975 - Gay Woods and Terry Woods - Backwoods
- 1975 – Paddy Mahone – Irish Rebellion Album
- 1978 - Christy Moore - The Iron Behind the Velvet
- 1986 – Terry Corcoran – Happy to Meet and Sorry to Part
- 1998 – Dolores Keane – Night Owl
- 2008 – Karan Casey – Ships in the Forest

== See also ==
- Dunlavin
