= The Time Has Come (Christy Moore album) =

Studio album by Christy Moore
- Released: 1983
- Studio: Windmill Lane Studios, Dublin
- Genre: Folk
- Label: WEA Ireland
- Producer: Christy Moore, Dónal Lunny

Christy Moore chronology
Christy Moore and Friends (1981)	The Time Has Come (1983)	Ride On (1984)

The Time Has Come is an Irish folk music album by Christy Moore. The album also features instrumental work by Irish musician Dónal Lunny.

== Track listing ==
1. "The Knock Song" (Christy Moore)
2. "Faithful Departed" (Philip Chevron)
3. "Nancy Spain" (Barney Rush)
4. "Lanigans Ball" (Christy Moore)
5. "All I Remember" (Mick Hanly)
6. "Lakes of Pontchartrain" (Christy Moore)
7. "Don't Forget Your Shovel" (Christie Hennessy)
8. "The Wicklow Boy" (Christy Moore)
9. "The Time Has Come" (Christy Moore, Dónal Lunny)
10. "Go Move Shift" (Ewan MacColl)
11. "Curragh of Kildare" (Christy Moore, Robert Burns)
12. "Sacco and Vanzetti" (Woody Guthrie)
13. "Section 31" (Barry Moore aka Luka Bloom)
14. "Only Our Rivers Run Free" (Mickey MacConnell)

== Personnel ==
- Christy Moore - vocals, guitar, bodhrán
- Dónal Lunny - vocals, guitar, bodhrán, bouzouki, keyboards, percussion
- Mandy Murphy - vocals
