= The Boys of Wexford =

Irish ballad

"The Boys of Wexford" (also known as The Flight of the Earls) is an Irish ballad commemorating the Irish Rebellion of 1798 and, more specifically, the Wexford Rebellion. The aim of rebellion was to remove English control from Irish affairs and it resulted in the 1801 Act of Union.

== History ==
The ballad was lyrics were composed by Robert Dwyer Joyce and music by Arthur Warren Darley, who also composed other Wexford ballads, "Boolavogue" and "Kelly the Boy from Killanne".

On the Isle of Man, the tune is known as Yn Speigh Er My Gealin (The Pick On My Shoulder).

== Popular culture ==
In James Joyce's novel Ulysses, in the Circe episode, a navvy shouts, "We are the boys. Of Wexford."

== JFK ==
On the second day of President John F Kennedy's four-day trip to Ireland in June 1963, school children sang The Boys of Wexford and Kelly the Boy from Killanne for the President. When asked if he'd like another song, Kennedy replied, "Another verse of The Boys of Wexford would be fine". Before leaving, he asked one of the students for a copy of the lyrics.

The melody, from a traditional Irish folk song, was arranged for the United States Marine Band at the request of President Kennedy, whose ancestors hailed from Wexford. The arrangement was done by noted composer and arranger Samuel L. Nestico.

The tune, orchestrated by Nelson Riddle, was later used for the opening and closing theme of the 1964 television series Profiles in Courage, based on Kennedy's book of the same name.

The song also held a prominent place in the political rallies of his younger brother, Senator Ted Kennedy.

== Recordings ==
The Wolfe Tones recorded the song on their debut 1965 album The Foggy Dew. Irish folk group, The Clancy Brothers, also recorded "The Boys of Wexford" on the 1995 album, Older But No Wiser.
