= Where I Come From (Christy Moore album) =

Album by Christy Moore

Studio album by Christy Moore
- Released: 2013
- Genre: Folk
- Label: Columbia Records

Christy Moore chronology
Folk Tale (2011)	Where I Come From (2013)	Lily (2016)

Where I Come From is a 3 disc album by Irish folk singer Christy Moore, released in 2013 by Columbia Records. The album features a number of new compositions as well as re-recordings of past songs.

== Reception ==
The Irish Times found the album "a statement of continued intent as well as a towering achievement" that provided a successful overview of Moore's work for both new and long-time listeners. The Guardian deemed it "both entertainment and history lesson", and "a still unique mix of politics, humour and lyricism". For the ABC it was "a fine way to revisit his work", and for No Depression it was a "wonderful collection of music from a true legend both inside and outside folk music".

== Track listing ==
=== Disc one ===
1. "Where I Come From" – 3:47
2. "Arthur's Day" – 3:26
3. "Veronica Guerin" – 3:08
4. "Scallcrows 2" – 2:03
5. "Derby Day" – 2:28
6. "Delirium Tremens" – 3:07
7. "The Stardust Song (a.k.a. They Never Came Home)" – 3:47
8. "Johnny Connors" – 3:28
9. "The Time Has Come" – 2:57
10. "The Birmingham Six" – 2:36
11. "St. Brendan's Voyage" – 4:00
12. "On the Mainland" – 1:41
13. "Barrowland" – 3:28
14. "Minds Locked Shut" – 3:00
15. "Song for Imelda Riney" – 2:33

=== Disc two ===
1. "North and South of the River"
2. "Welcome to the Cabaret"
3. "Giuseppe / Away Ye Broken Heart (Live from Belfast)"
4. "The Ballad of Ruby Walsh"
5. "Easter Snow (For Seamus Ennis)"
6. "Viva la Quinte Brigada"
7. "Song for Anne Lovett (a.k.a. Everybody Knew, Nobody Said)"
8. "Riding the High Stool"
9. "On the Bridge"
10. "Casey"
11. "Whacker Humphries"
12. "Knock Airport"
13. "Boning Hall"
14. "Encore"
15. "Arthur's Day (Live from Whelan's)"

=== Disc Three ===
1. "Lisdoonvarna"
2. "The Two Conneeleys"
3. "Tyrone Boys"
4. "Strange Ways"
5. "Yellow Triangle"
6. "The Boy from Tamlaghtduff"
7. "Haiti"
8. "Yellow Furze Woman"
9. "Lovely Young One"
10. "In Praise of Mullaghmore"
11. "The Wicklow Boy (Live from Lisdoonvarna)"
12. "Joxer Goes to Stuttgart"
13. "Ballydine"
14. "Me and the Rose"
15. "Where I Come From (Live from Knocknagoshel)"
