= H Block =

Studio album by Various
- Released: 1978
- Recorded: Dublin
- Genre: Folk
- Label: Music For H-Block
- Producer: Christy Moore

Various chronology
Live in Dublin (1978)	H Block (1978)	Christy Moore and Friends (1981)

H Block is an album recorded by various Irish folk artists, and produced by Christy Moore in 1978.

The album's title refers to the "H blocks" at Maze Prison (also known as "Long Kesh") in Northern Ireland, where Irish republican prisoners were held during the Troubles. The subject matter of several of these songs specifically centres on the period of the blanket and dirty protests at Maze and at Armagh Women's Prison. Of the ten tracks, only three are songs with both music and lyrics (Moore's 90 Miles from Dublin plus Hanley's On the Blanket and Brolly's H-Block Song); the other tracks are either instrumentals or spoken-word. The launch of the album was raided by the Special Detective Unit ("Special Branch") of the Republic of Ireland.

== Track listing ==
1. "Rights of Man" (Traditional) - Matt Molloy
2. "Guest of the Queen" (Brian Ua Baoill) - Stephen Ray
3. "On The Blanket" (Mick Hanly) - Mick Hanly
4. "H. Block Song" (Francie Brolly) - Francie Brolly
5. "Repeal the Union" (Traditional) - Matt Molloy
6. "Bright Star" - Stephen Ray
7. "Taimse I Mo Chodladh" (Traditional) - Dan Dowd
8. "90 Miles from Dublin" (Christy Moore) - Christy Moore
9. "A Retort" - Stephen Ray
10. "Lucy Campbell/Patsy Tuohy" (Traditional) - Noel Hill and Tony Linnane

== Personnel ==
- Christy Moore – vocals, guitar, bouzouki, bodhrán
- Declan Sinnott - guitar
- Dónal Lunny - bouzouki, guitar
- Dan O'Dowd - uilleann pipes on "Taimse I Mo Chodladh"
- Noel Hill - concertina on "Lucy Campbell/Patsy Tuohy"
- Tony Linnane - fiddle on "Lucy Campbell/Patsy Tuohy"
- Matt Molloy - flute on "Rights of Man" and "Repeal the Union"
- Stephen Rea - spoken word (credited as Stephen Ray)
