= Banna Strand (song) =

"Banna Strand" (also known as "The Lonely Banna Strand" - "The Ballad of Roger Casement" is a different song) is an Irish rebel song about the failed transport of arms into Ireland for use in the Easter Rising. Authorship of the song is unknown. The final verse was written by Derek Warfield of the Wolfe Tones in 1965 when Roger Casement's remains were finally returned to Ireland.

The first and second verses were re-written in 2016 by 'Tintean' a Kerry-based folk group, to provide a more factual and historically correct depiction of events.

== Lyrics ==
'On the twenty first of April, good Friday at the dawn.
A German boat was seen to float outside of Carrahane.
'With twenty thousand rifles, all ready for to land.'
And waiting for a signal
from the shores of Banna Strand.

A motor-car was dashing through the early morning gloom.
A sudden crash, and in the sea, they went to meet their doom
Three Irish lads lay dying there, just like their hopes so grand
They could not give the signal now
from lonely Banna Strand.

'No signal answers from the shore,' Sir Roger sadly said,
'No comrades here to welcome me, alas! they must be dead;
But I must do my duty, and at once I mean to land,'
So in a boat he pulled ashore
to lonely Banna Strand.

The German ship was lying there, with rifles in galore.
Up came a British ship and spoke, 'No Germans reach the shore;
You are our Empire's enemy, and so we bid you stand.
No German boot shall e'er pollute
the lonely Banna Strand.'

As they sailed for Queenstown Harbour, said the Germans: 'We're undone
The British have us vanquish'd: man for man and gun for gun.
We've twenty thousand rifles here, that never will reach land.
We'll sink them all, and bid farewell
to lonely Banna Strand.'

The R.I.C. were hunting for Sir Roger high and low,
They found him at McKenna's Fort, said they: 'You are our foe.'
Said he: 'I'm Roger Casement, here upon my native land,
I meant to free my countrymen
on lonely Banna Strand.'

They took Sir Roger prisoner and they sailed for London Town,
Where in the Tow'r they laid him, as a traitor to the Crown.
Said he, 'I am no traitor,' but his trial he had to stand,
for bringing German rifles
to lonely Banna Strand.

'Twas in an English prison that they led him to his death.
'I'm dying for my country dear,' he said with his last breath.
He's buried in a prison yard, far from his native land
And the wild waves sing his Requiem
on lonely Banna Strand.

They took Sir Roger home again in the year of sixty five
And with his comrades of sixteen in peace and tranquil lies
His last fond wish it is fulfilled for to lay in his native land
And the waves will roll in peace again
On the lonely Banna Strand.
