= Niall Vallely =

Irish musician (born 1970)

- Born: 1970 (age 55–56); Armagh, Northern Ireland
- Education: University College Cork; University of Limerick
- Occupation: Musician

Niall Vallely is an Irish musician, born 1970. In 1966 his parents, Brian and Eithne Vallely had founded the Armagh Piper's Club, but he chose to learn the concertina instead, from the age of seven. His brother Cillian plays the uilleann pipes and low whistle, learning from Mark Donnelly. Another of his brothers, Caoimhin, plays classical piano, tin whistle and fiddle. In 1990, Vallely founded the group Nomos, which released two albums before breaking up in 2000. In 1992, Vallely completed a degree in music at University College, Cork.

In 1998, Vallely released a solo album of contemporary and traditional tunes from Ireland and Scotland. He also produced and composed the tunes for Karan Casey's album for children The Seal Maiden. Niall and Karan married in Barga, Italy in 2007. He appears on some of her albums. In 1999, he released his debut solo album, Beyond Words, and in 2003 Callan Bridge with his brother Cillian on uilleann pipes. Over the past few years Vallely has also been spending a lot of time writing new music. In 2007, he was commissioned by the BBC to compose music for a major TV series, The Flight of the Earls. The resulting piece was then premiered at the Grand Opera House in Belfast as part of the Belfast Festival at Queens and had a subsequent performance at the Irish College in Louvain, Belgium, as part of their Flight of the Earls celebrations. In 2008, he composed an electro-acoustic piece entitled "Rakish" based on the music of travelling piper Johnny Doran which was premiered at the William Kennedy Piping Festival in Armagh. Recent commissions have included pieces for cellist Kate Ellis, Zoë Conway, and the Vanbrugh String Quartet.

In 2004 he formed Buille with his brother Caoimhín Vallely (piano) and guitarist Paul Meehan. They released their debut album in 2005 on the Vertical Records label. They released their second album in 2009, entitled Buille 2. It featured a diverse range of guests including brother Cillian on uilleann pipes, Zoë Conway on fiddle, Cian O’Duill on viola, Kate Ellis on cello, Neil Yates on trumpet and flugelhorn, Ed Boyd and Paul Meehan on guitars and Brian Morrissey on bodhrán, percussion and banjo.

== Discography ==
=== Solo ===
- Beyond Words (1999, Beyond Records)

=== with Cillian Vallely ===
- Callan Bridge (2002, Compass Records)

=== with Nomos ===
- I Won't Be Afraid Any More (1995, Solid/Grapevine/Green Linnet)
- Set You Free (1997, Grapevine/Green Linnet)

=== with Buille ===
- Buille (2005, Vertical Records)
- Buille 2 (2009, Crow Valley Music)

=== with Karan Casey ===
- Karan Casey & Friends – The Seal Maiden (2000, Music for Little People)
- Karan Casey – The Winds Begin to Sing (2001, Shanachie)
- Karan Casey – Distant Shore (2003, Shanachie/Vertical)
- Karan Casey – Chasing the Sun (2005, Shanachie)
- Karan Casey – Ships in the Forest (2008, Compass/Crow Valley Music)
- Karan Casey – Two More Hours (2014, Crow Valley Music)
- Karan Casey – Hieroglyphs That Tell The Tale (2018, Vertical Records)
- Karan Casey – Nine Apples Of Gold (2023, Crow Valley Music)

=== Other guest appearances ===
- Áine Uí Cheallaigh – Idir Dhá Chomhairle/In Two Minds (1995, Gael Linn)
- Paddy Keenan – na Keen Affair (1999, Hot Conya Records)
- Lewis Nash & David O'Rourke's Celtic Jazz Collective – Aislinn [a vision] (2001, Mapleshade)
- Tim O'Brien – Two Journeys (2001, Howdy Skies/Sugarhill Records)
- Donal Donnelly and Brian Hanlon – Driven (2003)
- Caoimhín Vallely – Strayaway (2005)
- Barry Kerr – The World Looks Away (2005)
- Tejedor – Música na Maleta (2006, Arís Música)
- Daimh – Diversions (2010, Greentrax)

=== Compilations ===
- River of Sound (1995, Virgin CD + BBC Video)
- Sult, Spirit of the Music (1997, Hummingbird) (w. Nomos)
- Gael Force DVD (1998, w. Nomos)
- Mega Celtique (1999, w. Nomos)
- Celtic Christmas, Silver Anniversary Edition (2001, Windham Hill Records)
- Live From The Katharine Cornell Theater (2002)
- Celtic Compass (2003, Compass Records)
- Masters of the Accordion (2004, Arc)
- Very Best of Celtic Christmas (2004, Windham Hill)
- Live Recordings From The William Kennedy Piping Festival (2004)
- Other Voices, Songs from a Room 2 (2004)
- Excalibur II: The Celtic Ring (2007, EMI)
- Armagh Pipers Club 40th Anniversary (2007)
- A Christmas Celtic Sojourn Live [CD and DVD] (2007)
- Anglo International (2008)
- Transatlantic Sessions 4 [CD and DVD] (2010, Whirlie Records)
- Highland Sessions [DVD] (2011, Whirlie Records)
