= Karan Casey =

Irish folk singer (born 1969)

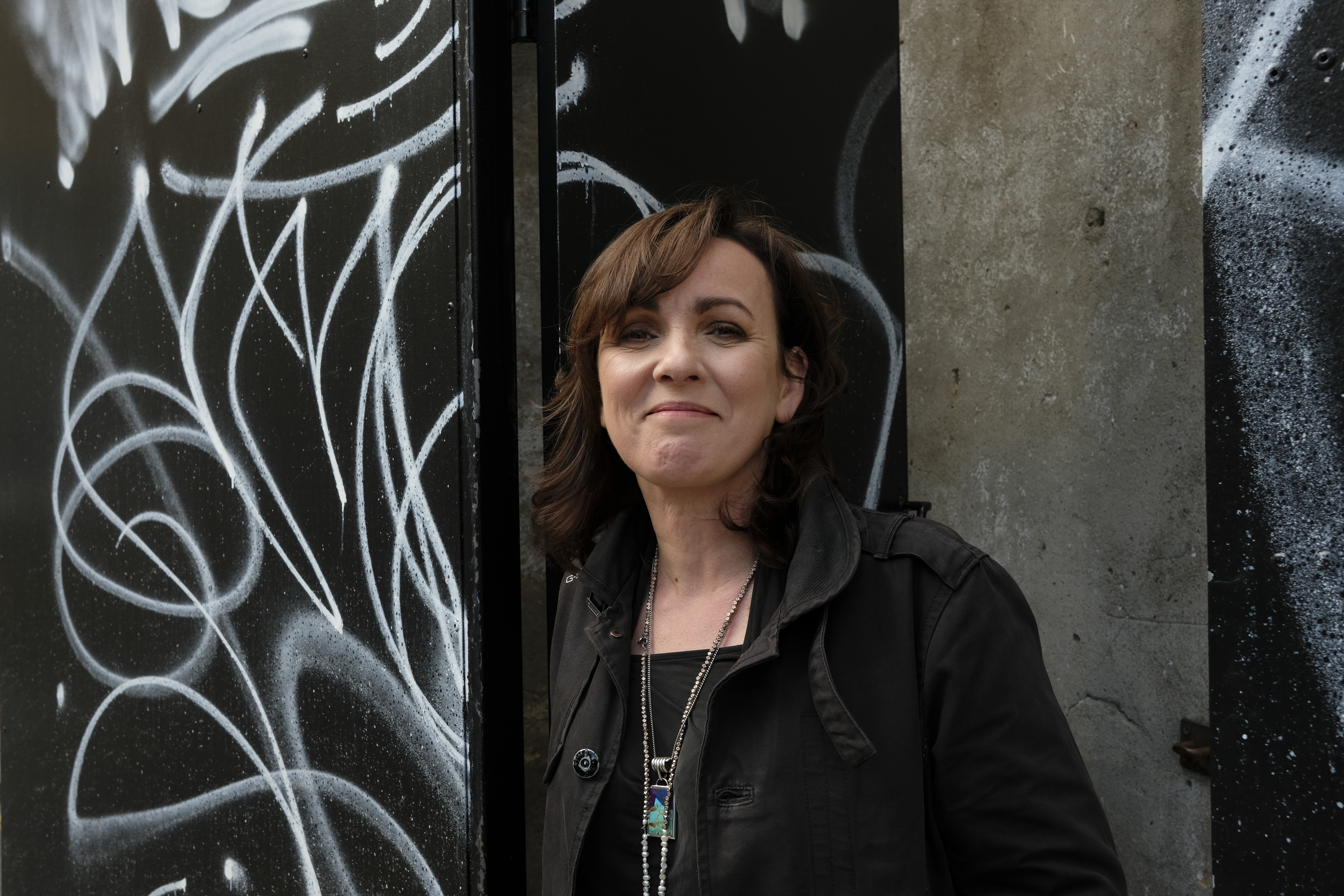

Background information
- Born: 1969 (age 56–57); Kilmeaden, County Waterford, Ireland
- Genres: Celtic; Folk
- Occupations: Singer songwriter producer Pianist
- Years active: 1996–present
- Labels: Crow Valley Music (own label); Compass Records
- Website: karancasey.com

Karan Casey (born 1969) is an Irish folk singer, and a former member of the Irish band Solas. She resides in County Cork, Ireland.

== Early years ==
Casey was born in Ballyduff Lower, Kilmeaden, County Waterford, Ireland. Her family encouraged her to sing in the house, in a church choir and at school. At Waterford Regional Technical College she studied piano then took music at University College Dublin in 1987. Having learned to copy Ella Fitzgerald's scat singing, she performed in a Dublin bistro several nights per week while still a student. At the Royal Irish Academy of Music she studied classical music and sang in a jazz band, then a folk-ballad band, then another jazz band. She also fell under the influence of Dublin folk singer Frank Harte. During this time she also formed her own band, called "Dorothy".

== Immigration to the USA ==
In 1993, Casey moved to New York City, to study jazz at Long Island University. When she began to frequent Irish traditional sessions in New York, she started singing Irish traditional music again, performing mostly in bars and local centres. During 1994, she sang with Atlantic Bridge before joining Solas, recording five songs on their début album in 1996. At the same time, she was still performing jazz and folk material herself at the Tramps club in Manhattan, accompanied only by a percussionist. In 1997, Casey recorded a solo album, Songlines, inspired by the novel of the same name by Bruce Chatwin and produced by Séamus Egan. The album featured both Irish traditional and contemporary folk songs, and included several members of Solas.

== Solo career ==
Casey left Solas at the beginning of 1999 to pursue her solo ambitions. She then moved back to Ireland, although frequently travelled between her home in County Cork and America. In 2000, she collaborated with several other vocalists on Seal Maiden: a Celtic Musical. It concerned the mythical creature called the selkie (in this case, a seal-woman). The album featured a story written by Irish playwright Marina Carr narrated by Casey, produced by Niall Vallely and Leib Ostrow, and featured contributions from Martin Hayes & Dennis Cahill, Iarla Ó Lionaird, Máiréad Ní Mhaonaigh, Michael McGoldrick, Mel Mercier and Robbie Overson.

In 2001, Casey finished working on her second solo album, The Winds Begin to Sing (2001) which was well received by critics and propelled her into a stable solo career. She released Distant Shore in 2003 and toured extensively throughout the Americas and Europe. In 2005, Casey released Chasing the Sun featuring Irish traditional and folk songs which she learned from her mother and maternal grandmother. The album included a number of songs written by Casey herself as well as songs by Belfast musician Barry Kerr. The album was well received and was the last to be released on the Shanachie and Vertical labels so that Casey, husband Niall Vallely and other associated acts could release her music independently.

In 2006, Casey joined her previous band Solas to guest on their live DVD and album, Reunion: a Decade of Solas. On the recordings, Casey was joined by all of the band's past members and current members from the period. She joined Deirdre Scanlan (Solas vocalist 2000–2007) and Antje Duvekot, along with the male vocalists from the band.

In 2008, Casey and her husband set up Crow Valley Music to release Ships in the Forest.

In early 2010, Casey released Exiles Return, a duet album with former Solas bandmate John Doyle; it was listed among the Top 5 albums of the year by The Irish Echo newspaper.

Released in 2014, Two More Hours was Casey's sixth solo album and her first entirely self-penned work. Contemporary in tone, it takes a much more personal approach to her writing and singing. It features a duet with Irish chart-topper Mick Flannery as well as contributions from Abigail Washburn and Aoife O’Donovan, and was produced by Niall Vallely. A departure from the traditional music she has focused on for many years, Two More Hours draws on Casey's lifelong love of R&B, jazz and blues in creating a vibrant new mix of sounds. Vallely's string arrangements help meld together a cast of Ireland's musicians from the worlds of classical, folk and rock music including Ken Rice, Kate Ellis, Sean Og Graham (of Beoga), Trevor Hutchinson, Eoghan Regan, Danny Byrt and Caoimhín Vallely.

In 2017 Karan was Traditional Artist in Residence at University College Cork, toured the UK with the Transatlantic Sessions, performed at Glasgow's Celtic Connections, and toured in the US both with her own band and with Lúnasa, including a performance at New York's Carnegie Hall.

In 2018 Karan helped to found FairPlé which is an organization aimed at achieving fairness and gender balance for female performers in Irish traditional and folk musics.

In 2019 she released her album, Hieroglyphs That Tell the Tale, on the Vertical Records Label. Produced by renowned Scottish producer and BAFTA-nominated composer Donald Shaw, the album also features Karan's long-time musical collaborators Sean Óg Graham & Niamh Dunne (Beoga), Kate Ellis (The Crash Ensemble) and Niall Vallely (Buille). Drawing inspiration from contemporary folk writers Janis Ian, Eliza Gilkyson, Mick Flannery and Bob Dylan, the album displays Casey's impressive talent as a songwriter. She is joined on vocals by some of the women singers she's long-admired, including Karen Matheson, Niamh Dunne, Pauline Scanlon, Maura O'Connell and Aoife O Donovan.

In December 2022, she released a single, Nine Apples of Gold, and announced a then-forthcoming album of the same name. The album was released 2023-02-22.

Casey has also collaborated with Bela Fleck, Maura O'Connell, Tim O'Brien, Lunasa, The Boston Pops Orchestra, The Dubliners & Imelda May, A Stór Mo Chroí (featuring John Spillane, Lumiere and Muireann Nic Amhlaoibh), among others.

== Personal life ==
Casey married Irish concertina player, Niall Vallely, in February 2007. She has two children, Muireann and Áine.

She has collaborated frequently with the Vallely brothers and their bands.

== Discography ==
=== Solo albums ===
- 1997 – Songlines
- 2000 – Seal Maiden (Karan Casey & friends)
- 2001 – The Winds Begin To Sing
- 2003 – Distant Shore
- 2005 – Chasing The Sun
- 2008 – Ships in the Forest
- 2014 – Two More Hours
- 2018 – Hieroglyphs That Tell the Tale
- 2023 – Nine Apples of Gold

=== With Solas ===
- 1996 – Solas
- 1997 – Sunny Spells and Scattered Showers
- 1998 – The Words That Remain
- 2006 – Reunion: A Decade of Solas (CD/DVD)

=== Miscellaneous recordings ===
- 1996 – Her Song: Exotic Voices of Women from Around the World (Various Artists)
- 1997 – Celtic Tapestry, Vol. 2 (Various Artists)
- 1997 – Holding up Half the Sky: Women's Voices from Around the World (Various Artists)
- 1997 – Her Song: Exotic Voices of Women from Around the World (Various Artists)
- 1997 – Voices of Celtic Women: Holding up Half the Sky (Various Artists)
- 1998 – Africans in America (Original Television Soundtrack) (Various Artists)
- 1998 – Celtic Tides (Various Artists)
- 1998 – Greatest Hits (Paul Winter)
- 1998 – Legends of Ireland (Various Artists)
- 1998 – Winter's Tale (Various Artists)
- 1999 – Celtic Solstice (Paul Winter)
- 1999 – Holding up Half the Sky: Voices of Celtic Women Vol 2 (Various Artists)
- 1999 – Thousands Are Sailing (Various Artists)
- 2000 – Emerald Aether: Shape Shifting/Reconstructions Of Irish Music (Bill Laswell)
- 2000 – Fused (Michael McGoldrick)
- 2000 – Fits of Passion – High Spirited Celtic Captured by Starbucks (Various Artists)
- 2000 – Ceol Tacsaí (Various Artists)
- 2001 – Celtic Christmas: Silver Anniversary Edition (Various Artists)
- 2001 – Evening Comes Early (John Doyle)
- 2001 – Two Journeys (Tim O'Brien)
- 2001 – Lullaby: a Collection (Various Artists)
- 2003 – Brown Girl in the Ring (Various Artists)
- 2004 – Very Best of Celtic Christmas (Various Artists)
- 2004 – Other Voices: Songs from a Room Vol 2 (Various Artists)
- 2005 – Lullaby: 20th Anniversary Special Edition (Various Artists)
- 2005 – 20 Great Kid’s Songs: 20th Anniversary Special Collector’s Edition (Various Artists)
- 2005 – Folktopia (Various Artists)
- 2006 – Magic Nights in The Lobby Bar (Various Artists)
- 2006 – Acoustic Affair Vol. 1 (Various Artists)
- 2007 – A Christmas Celtic Sojourn Live (Various Artists)
- 2007 – Excalibur: Vol. 2 (Alan Simon)
- 2008 – Absolutely Irish (Various Artists)
- 2010 – Exiles Return (with John Doyle)
- 2014 – A Prairie Home Companion- Duets 2 (Various Artists)
