= Traveller (Christy Moore album) =

Studio album by Christy Moore
- Released: 1999
- Genre: Folk
- Label: Sony
- Producer: Leo Pearson

Christy Moore chronology
Graffiti Tongue (1996)	Traveller (1999)	This is the Day (2001)

Professional ratings
Review scores
Source	Rating
Allmusic	link

Traveller is an album by Christy Moore, released in 1999.

== Track listing ==
1. "Urgency Culture"
2. "Raggle Taggle Gypsy"
3. "I Loved Her"
4. "Tell It unto Me"
5. "Rocky Road to Dublin"
6. "Last Cold Kiss"
7. "Lovely Young One"
8. "The Siren's Voice"
9. "Burning Times"
10. "Glastonbury"
11. "The Well"
12. "What's the Story, Git"

== Personnel ==
- Christy Moore – vocal, guitar, bodhran
- Leo Pearson – keyboards, guitar, percussion, programming
- Dónal Lunny – bouzouki
- Liam O'Flynn – Uilleann pipes
- The Edge – guitar
- Juno Moore – vocals
- Andy Moore – vocals
- Dom Muldoon – guitars
- Conor Byrne – flutes, whistle
- Wally Page – guitar
