= Charlie Murphy (singer-songwriter) =

American singer-songwriter

- Born: July 4, 1953; Baltimore, Maryland
- Died: August 6, 2016 (aged 63); Whidbey Island, Washington
- Occupation: Musician
- Spouse: Eric Mulholland
- Musical career
- Genres: Singer-songwriter; Neopagan music

Charlie Murphy (July 4, 1953 – August 6, 2016) was an American activist and singer-songwriter.

== Biography ==
=== Early life ===
Charles "Charlie" Joseph Murphy Jr. was born in Baltimore on July 4, 1953. He was the third of seven children. His mother, Angela Murphy, was a nurse and his father, Charlie Murphy Sr., was a court stenographer. He was described as engaging and outgoing in high school, and was involved in theater, debate, and student government. Influenced by the civil rights and anti-war movements that he witnessed early in life, Murphy decided to devote himself to facilitating social change. While studying sociology at Loyola University Maryland, Murphy also worked as a camp counselor.

After graduating from Loyola, Murphy began working in youth mental health services in Roanoke, Virginia. After a time, however, he realized that he was "being asked to help these young people to adjust to a world in turmoil rather than to empower them to take an active role in making things better," and decided to transition from work in mental health to social activism through music.

=== Personal life ===
In 2002, Murphy received an email from a former student of a friend, Eric Mulholland, who had just moved to the area and was seeking new connections. They started dating a week after they met. Two years later, Murphy proposed while they were on a trip to Portugal, and they married in 2006. The day after their wedding, they took what Murphy referred to as a "honeymoon of service" and traveled to Uganda to work with youth living with HIV. In a 2015 interview, Murphy said with regards to Eric, "I took one look at him and thought to myself, 'I could spend the rest of my life with him" and "I always felt married to him since I met him." The two resided on Whidbey Island in Washington.

== Musical career ==
=== Solo career ===
Murphy began touring as a folk musician in the mid-1970s. In 1978, he was featured on the compilation album Walls to Roses – Songs For Changing Men, which was unique at the time for featuring music by both gay and straight musicians. Murphy's album Catch the Fire (1981), released on the Good Fairy Productions label, contained the original version of "Burning Times", later covered by Christy Moore and Roy Bailey. The album is notable for addressing LGBT issues and pagan spirituality within its lyrics. The song "Burning Times" concerns the persecution of women accused of witchcraft in the Middle Ages and early modern periods. Its chorus mentions several pagan female deities: Isis, Astarte, Diana, Hecate, Demeter, Kali... Inanna. It also mentions that nine million women died, ...in this holocaust against the nature people. The other key song, "Gay Spirit", expresses the frustration of growing up gay within a prejudiced society: When we were born they tried to put us in a cage, and tell our bodies what to feel, we have chosen to feel all the truth, that our bodies do reveal.... The chorus is a rousing burst of optimism: There's a gay spirit singing in our hearts, leading us through these troubled times, There's a gay spirit moving 'round this land, calling us to a time of open love.

=== Rumors of the Big Wave ===
In 1979, Murphy met cellist and future creative partner Jami Sieber. They worked together as a folk duo for five years, and then started the band Rumors of the Big Wave in the late 1980s. They recorded two albums, Secret Language (1989), and Burning Times (1992). In 1994, they performed during "In A New Light '94", a prime time special on AIDS that was hosted by Barbara Walters.

== Activism ==
At the age of 40, Murphy chose to leave his career in music to focus once again on helping youth. He served as Cultural Coordinator and then as Training Director for the Earth Service Corps, a national youth environmental program run by the YMCA. In 1996, he co-founded the youth development organization Power of Hope: Youth Empowerment Through The Arts with Peggy Taylor. He and Taylor would go on to found PYE Global: Partners For Youth Empowerment with entrepreneur Ian Watson in 2009. Murphy and Mulholland worked with PYE for several years, expanding its network to 15 countries and reaching millions of youth worldwide.

In the spring of 2015, Murphy was diagnosed with ALS. He died at midnight on August 6, 2016.
