= The Peeler and the Goat =

Irish rebel song

"The Peeler and the Goat" is an old Irish rebel song, transportation ballad, and mockery of police corruption within the Royal Irish Constabulary that continues to be sung by Irish traditional musicians throughout the world.

== History ==
The Peeler and the Goat was intended to poke fun at a number of factors affecting 19th century Ireland. Even though the Penal Laws, which had been passed as religious persecution of Irish Catholics, had been overturned by the Catholic Emancipation in 1829, pervasive religious discrimination continued until the end of the Irish War of Independence in 1922. Widespread poverty and starvation also continued and were rooted in the legality of rackrenting and other abuses of power by the Anglo-Irish landlord class, whose edicts were enforced by Sir Robert Peel and his newly formed Royal Irish Constabulary. RIC officers were nicknamed Bobbies and Peelers after their creator.

Originally written during the Victorian era by Darby Ryan of Bansha, County Tipperary, the song was reportedly inspired by the absurdity of RIC officers taking a domestic goats into 'custody' for creating an obstruction on a rural County Tipperary road.

== Plot ==
A Royal Irish Constabulary officer finds a she-goat roaming the streets of Bansha, County Tipperary and, presuming her guilty of loitering or prostitution ('Stholler', as used in the lyrics, has both meanings). The peeler arrests her and vows that he will soon send her off to prison in Cashel and that the judge will sentence her to transportation as a convict from Cork harbour to Australia.

The Constable and the she-goat argue over her arrest, and whether or not the court system would return a conviction without proof that a crime was committed. At the end of the song, the she-goat accuses the peeler of alcoholism, extortion, and police corruption, and alleges that if she were able to bribe him with protection money or illegal liquor, she would be allowed to go free.

== Symbolism ==
- The Goat: Generally thought of as representing the religious persecution and dire impoverishment faced by Irish Catholics. This conclusion is supported by statements such as "No penal law did I transgress", and the general behavior of the Peeler towards the goat. The fact that the goat is female allows the peeler to spin doctor her actions as prostitution and file charges accordingly in his quest for a bribe.
- The Peeler: A policeman of the Royal Irish Constabulary, the Peeler is used to lampoon the absurd laws and regular abuses of powers under colonialism. His arrogant statements and bizarre logic, as well as the she-goat's revelation that he is a drunkard and a corrupt policeman, demonstrate he is the true target of the song's satire. The tragic irony of the song is that the RIC was intended to provide trustworthy, incorruptible, and professional law enforcement in contrast to recent police corruption scandals such as that surrounding Dublin City Major Henry Charles Sirr. In reality, though, the Peeler in the song is far from the only example of a corrupt RIC policeman. RIC Sub-Inspector Thomas Hartley Montgomery was convicted of brutally murdering William Glass during an 1871 bank robbery at Omagh. He still remains the only police officer in Irish history to receive the death penalty for murder.
