= The Christy Moore Collection 1981–1991 =

Compilation album by Christy Moore
- Released: 9 September 1991
- Recorded: 1981–1991
- Producer: Christy Moore, Dónal Lunny

The Christy Moore Collection 1981–1991 is a compilation album by Christy Moore.

== Track listing ==
All tracks composed and arranged by Christy Moore; except where indicated

1. "Ordinary Man" (Peter Hames)
2. "Mystic Lipstick" (Jimmy McCarthy)
3. "Lakes of Pontchartrain" (Traditional)
4. "The City of Chicago" (Barry Moore)
5. "Faithful Departed" (Philip Chevron)
6. "Don't Forget Your Shovel" (Christie Hennessy)
7. "Delirium Tremens"
8. "Knock Song"
9. "Messenger Boy" (Christie Hennessy)
10. "Lisdoonvarna"
11. "The Voyage" (Johnny Duhan)
12. "Missing You" (Jimmy McCarthy)
13. "The Night Visit" (Traditional)
14. "Biko Drum"
15. "The Time Has Come" (Dónal Lunny, Christy Moore)
16. "Easter Snow"
17. "Bright Blue Rose"
18. "The Reel in the Flickering Light"
19. "Nancy Spain" (Barney Rush)
20. "Ride On" (Jim McCarthy)
