= The Dying Rebel =

Irish rebel song

"The Dying Rebel" (My Only Son was Shot in Dublin) is a popular Irish rebel song about a man finding a dying Irish rebel from County Cork in Dublin during the 1916 Easter Rising. Its age is uncertain, but it is still sung by contemporary Irish singers.

The song does not refer to the death of any particular rebel. It reflects on the human cost of rebellion rather than the glorification of the conflict and the martyrdom of its leaders. It has been performed and recorded by many Irish artists. It originates from sometime before 1961, but the author is unknown.

In 1957, the Glasgow born skiffle player Lonnie Donegan made a recording of the song, which was released in 1958.

It was recorded in Ireland on the Glenside label in 1961 by Patricia Blake.

It was recorded by Tommy Drennan and the Monarchs in 1966 and released on the Ember label album Fifty Years After. It was re-released on the Celtic Pride label, on Kevin Barry, in 1999. Dominic Behan recorded it on the soundtrack of the 1966 TV documentary Rebellion At Easter.

More recently it was recorded by The Wolfe Tones, Sonny Knowles (on Sunshine and Shamrocks), Margo on Country and Irish, The Jolly Beggarmen (on The Very Best of Irish Rebel Songs), Athenrye (on The Dying Rebel, 1997), Clover Rebel Band, and the Merry Ploughboys (on their second album, Unharnessed, 1999). A popular version of the song was recorded by Éire Óg, although the song was written decades before the band formed.
