= Jimmy Faulkner =

- Birth name: James Faulkner
- Born: 31 January 1950; Dolphin's Barn, Dublin, Ireland
- Died: 4 March 2008 (aged 58); Dublin, Ireland
- Genres: Rock, blues, folk
- Occupation: Musician
- Instrument: Guitar
- Years active: 1965–2008

Jimmy Faulkner (31 January 1950 – 4 March 2008) was one of Ireland's top guitarists, who in a four-decade career played with many of Ireland's leading rock and roll, blues, folk and jazz musicians.

He was born in Dolphin's Barn, Dublin to a musical family. He started playing music in the 1960s with fellow Irish guitarist Pat Farrell, when he formed the Jangle Dangle band. He later played in Freak Show with Pete Cummins and vocalist Ditch Cassidy. In the 1970s and 1980s, he had a residence with Red Peters and The Floating Dublin Blues Band in the Meeting Place in Dorset Street in Dublin, and played with Christy Moore, Dónal Lunny, Mary Coughlan (singer), Paul Brady and his band and Luka Bloom and many more. At the end of the 1980s, he went on to play with the Fleadh Cowboys, Hotfoot and his own band The Housebreakers.

He could play in a number of styles: blues/rock, folk, traditional, country or even in the jazz style of Django Reinhardt. His main instrument was a red 1967 Fender Stratocaster, but he also played a Gibson ES335 which he got in California.

Before his death from cancer in 2008, he was playing weekly in JJ's in Aungier Street and in the DCC venue in Camden Row, among other venues. He was honoured with 'A Tribute to Jimmy Faulkner, a special night of music at The Olympia Theatre on Monday 22 September 2008. The amazing bill included many artistes he had played with including Christy Moore and Declan Sinnott, Paul Brady, Gary Moore, Red Peters, Pat Farrell, James Delaney, Ed Deane, Mik Pyro, Greg Boland, James Delaney, Philip Donnelly, Richie Buckley, Nigel Mooney, Robbie Overson, Noel Bridgeman, Frankie lane, Pete Cummins and many more with and the show was dedicated to Jimmy's family with proceeds to MQI Ireland supporting the Homeless.

== Discography ==
- Whatever Tickles Your Fancy (1975)
- Christy Moore (1976)
- The Iron Behind the Velvet (1978)
- Live in Dublin (1978)
- Smoke and Strong Whiskey (1991)
- Acoustik: Kieran Halpin (!992)
