= Pat of Mullingar =

Irish rebel song

Pat of Mullingar is an Irish rebel song that has been sung and recorded by several folk artists and groups, including the Irish Rovers, Derek Warfield, and The Wolfe Tones. The initial rendition of the song typically featured a portrayal of an Irish carman praising the exceptional attributes of his horse.

== Lyrics ==
You may talk and write and boast about your Fenians and your clans,
And how the boys from County Cork beat up the Black and Tans.
And view a little codger who came out without a scar.
His name is Paddy Mulligan, the man from Mullingar.

The Peelers chased him out of Connemara,
For beatin' up the valiant Dan O'Hara.
And when he came to Ballymoe, he stole the Parson's car,
And he sold it to the Bishop in the town of Castlebar.
Seven hundred Peelers couldn't catch him.
The Chieftain paid the army for to catch him.
And when he came to Dublin Town, he stole an armoured car
And gave it to the IRA brigade in Mullingar.

Well the Peelers got their orders to suppress the man on sight.
So they sent for reinforcements through the county left and right.
Three thousand men surrounded him, they hunted near and far.
But he was with the IRA in Johnston's Motor Car.

The Peelers chased him out of Connemara,
For beatin' up the valiant Dan O'Hara.
And when he came to Ballymoe, he stole the Parson's car,
And he sold it to the Bishop in the town of Castlegar.
Seven hundred Peelers couldn't match him.
The Chieftain paid the army for to catch him.
And when he came to Dublin Town, he stole an armoured car
And gave it to the IRA brigade in Mullingar.

They came with tanks and armoured cars, they came with all their might.
Them Peelers never counted on old Paddy's dynamite.
On the fourteenth day of April, well he blew them to July.
And the name of Paddy Mulligan took half of Ireland's pride.

== See also ==
- Protest song
