= Back Home in Derry =

Irish rebel song

"Back Home in Derry" is an Irish rebel song written by Bobby Sands while imprisoned in HM Prison Maze.

The song has been performed by multiple artists, most notably by Christy Moore on his 1984 album Ride On, who sang it to a melody inspired by Gordon Lightfoot's famous 1976 song "The Wreck of the Edmund Fitzgerald". Moore's version is shorter than the original poem.

== Context ==
The lyrics describe the voyage of Irish rebels, convicted to exile in Australia, in the aftermath of the Irish Rebellion of 1803. The narrator describes the feelings of the men as they sail away from Ireland, in precarious conditions, while the chorus is a lament of longing for Derry. The city appears to be used as a symbol for one's hometown, as historically, the Irish Rebellion of 1803 was centered around Dublin. Throughout the song, the narrator describes the mistreatment of Irish prisoners by the Dublin Castle administration, and the execution of Robert Emmet is mentioned.

The narrator is ultimately deported to van Diemen's land, where he endures a harsh existence of servitude and violence.

In the last stanza of the song, the narrator remains a hardened republican, despite his trials of twenty years:

Twenty years have gone by and I’ve ended my bond,
My comrades' ghosts walk beside me.
Well a rebel I came and sure I'll die the same,
On a cold winter's night you will find me.

— Bobby Sands
