= The Valley of Knockanure =

Coordinates: 52.44778°N 9.38214°W

Location in Ireland of massacre site.

The Valley of Knockanure is the name of several ballads commemorating a murder by the Royal Irish Constabulary that occurred during the Irish War of Independence at Gortaglanna (Gortagleanna) near Knockanure, County Kerry, Ireland. The best-known of these was written by teacher and poet Bryan MacMahon (d. 1998) at the request of a local schoolmaster, Pádraig Ó Ceallacháin.

== Historical background ==
On 12 May 1921, a troop of Black and Tans were travelling out from Listowel towards Athea when they arrested four young unarmed men in Gortaglanna. Prior to this the barracks in Listowel had been burnt out and in retaliation the troops, who were under the influence of alcohol, decided to execute the young men. The first to be shot was Jerry Lyons. When this happened, Cornelius Dee decided, as he was going to be shot anyway, to make a run for it. He did, and almost immediately took a bullet in the thigh but managed to keep going. He ran for about three miles and survived. He was never recaptured but remained in hiding until the truce. The other two men were shot on the spot. Today a memorial stands by the roadside where the three died. A film about the events was made in 2009.

== Recordings ==
- Willie Brady, 1961
- Seosamh Ó hÉanaí: The Road from Connemara (1964), re-issued on Topic TSCD518D/Cló Iar-Chonnachta CICD 143 (October 2000)
- Paddy Tunney
- Clancy Brothers, 1963
- The Wolfe Tones
- Daoirí Farrell
- Sean Dunphy

== Bibliography ==
- Paddy Tunney, Where Songs do Thunder (1991)
- Gabriel Fitzmaurice, The World of Bryan McMahon
