= Christy Moore =

Irish folk singer, songwriter, and guitarist (born 1945)

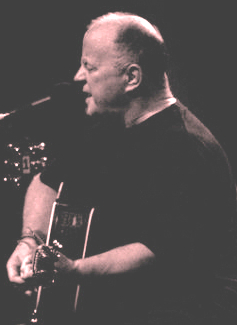
- Moore performing in 2008

Background information
- Born: Christopher Andrew Moore; 7 May 1945 (age 81)
- Origin: Newbridge, County Kildare, Ireland
- Genres: Folk, traditional Irish
- Occupations: Musician, songwriter
- Instruments: Vocals, guitar, bodhrán
- Years active: 1969–present
- Website: https://www.christymoore.com

Christopher Andrew "Christy" Moore (born 7 May 1945) is an Irish folk singer, songwriter and guitarist. He was one of the founding members of the bands Planxty and Moving Hearts and has had significant success as a solo artist. His first album, Paddy on the Road, was recorded with Dominic Behan in 1969. Moore is best known for his political and social commentary and left-wing, Irish republican views. In 2007, he was named as Ireland's greatest living musician in RTÉ's People of the Year Awards. Moore is most known for his unique style, including driving rhythms on six-string acoustic guitar and bodhrán as well as slower ballads.

== Early life and family ==
Moore was born 7 May 1945 in Newbridge, County Kildare, Ireland, son of Andy Moore (1915-1956) and Nancy (nee Power). His mother was a Fine Gael election candidate and his brother is fellow singer-songwriter Luka Bloom (née Barry Moore) His nephew is Conor Byrne, a traditional flautist and tin whistle player and Moore appeared on Byrne's Wind Dancer album.

In 1949 he started schooling at the Holy Family Sisters infant school in Newbridge, continuing on to the Patrician Brothers primary school in 1953. Starting in 1958 he attended the fee-paying Dominican-run Newbridge College where he sang in the school choir and performed in opera. In 1962, aged 17 he watched Tommy Makem and The Clancy Brothers perform at the Olympia Theatre, Dublin which is credited as his first major influence in Irish music performance.

In 1963, Moore moved to Clonmel, County Tipperary, where he worked at the National Bank branch there. During a bank strike which lasted twelve weeks he travelled to England doing general labouring work, but did not return when the strike was settled after having had a "wonderful time in England, with no bank manager looking over [his] shoulder".

Whilst in England he frequented folk clubs and Irish music pubs where he met Seamus Ennis, Margaret Barry, Luke Kelly, Martin Byrnes and many other traditional musicians. When Irish singing trio The Grehan Sisters, with whom Moore was previously acquainted, moved to the north of England from Dublin in 1967, they helped Moore by giving him contacts and support slots on their concerts.

In 1966 knowing music was his direction in life he decided to go professional and by 1967 he was renting a room in the Rusholme area of Manchester. At first his success was hit and miss, turning up to gigs and asking if they needed an opener, which eventually led to steadier work. Whilst queueing for a Hamish Imlach gig at Manchester Sports Guild, noticing his guitar case, which was an uncommon sight in those days, Imlach approached him and struck up a conversation, inviting him into the venue as his guest, leading to a long-time friendship. Whilst touring together for many years after, the pair were heavy drinkers and users of cannabis, Imlach smoking it but Moore only chewing it.

== Musical career ==
In 1973 his first major release, Prosperous, brought together the four musicians who shortly after formed Planxty: Liam O'Flynn, Andy Irvine and Dónal Lunny. For a time, they called themselves "CLAD", an acronym of their names, but soon decided on Planxty.

After leaving Planxty in 1975, Moore continued his solo career, occasionally reforming his old band (as he has been doing ever since). He also formed the band Moving Hearts with Lunny and five other musicians in 1980. In 1987, he appeared on Gay Byrne's The Late Late Show performing with The Dubliners for their 25th anniversary celebration. In 2000 he published his autobiography, One Voice.

Moore's earlier lifestyle resulted in a decline in health and several operations. He had a heart attack in the 1980s. His battle with alcohol and subsequent heart operations took their toll, and at the end of the 1990s Moore reduced his workload for medical reasons. In an interview in 1991, he admitted that constant drinking, which had started as "great fun", had become an illness. Some of Moore's songs were heavily influenced by drink and the effects of drink, the song "Delirium Tremens" being an example. Johnny Mulhern's song "Hard Cases" caused Moore to recall the Galway drinking scene with local musicians Mickey Finn, Pete Galligan, Corky and Terry Smith.

On 17 April 2009, Moore released his first new studio album in four years, entitled Listen, and promoted it through a series of live gigs. In December 2011 he released the album Folk Tale. His next album, Where I Come From, was released in November 2013 and featured a new protest song called "Arthur's Day". The album peaked at number three in the Irish album charts. On the road was released in November 2017, Magic Nights was released in November 2019, and his most recent album, A Terrible Beauty, was released in November 2024.

In March 2025, in his 80th year, Moore began a three-month, sold-out, 18-date tour of Ireland. In an interview in October 2024, he said he rehearsed for hours most days and prepared carefully for each gig, an average of one a week. "After each performance I go home and spend a week preparing for the next one". He recalled that in his early career he had once played 67 nights in succession.

On 31 December 2025, Irish Traditional Music Archive (ITMA) and TG4 released Cartlann Christy Moore, a documentary on his career, featuring Michael D. Higgins, Radie Peat, DJ Próvaí, and other influential figures.

== Political and social commentary ==
Moore is well known for his political and social commentary, which reflects a left-wing, Irish republican perspective, despite the fact that his mother was a Fine Gael county councillor and parliamentary candidate in Kildare. He supported the republican H-Block protestors with the albums H-Block in 1978, the launch of which was raided by the police, and The Spirit of Freedom. He has also recorded songs by the hunger striker Bobby Sands, including "Back Home in Derry" which was based on Gordon Lightfoot's song "The Wreck of the Edmund Fitzgerald". He ceased supporting the military activities of the IRA in 1987 after the Enniskillen bombing.

Political songs he has performed throughout his career include Mick Hanly's "On the Blanket" about the protests of republican prisoners, "Viva la Quinta Brigada" about the Irishmen who fought in the Spanish Civil War against Francisco Franco, and "Minds Locked Shut" about Bloody Sunday in Derry.

Moore has endorsed a long list of leftist causes, ranging from El Salvador to Mary Robinson in the 1990 presidential election. He has incorporated songs about Salvador Allende ('Allende') and Ronald Reagan ('Ronnie Reagon') into his repertoire.

At the Glastonbury Festival in 2005 he sang about the Palestinian solidarity activist Rachel Corrie, to whom he also dedicated his album of the same year, Burning Times. He supported the anti-nuclear movement in Ireland and played in many concerts and at festivals in Carnsore Point for the cause.

== Banned song ==
"They Never Came Home" was a song about the Stardust fire of 1981 in which 48 people died. The song was released on the Ordinary Man album and on the B-side of a single in 1985. The song achieved notoriety when Moore was taken to court over claims in the song that were alleged to be prejudicial to an ongoing court case which was determining compensation. As an example, the song claimed that "hundreds of children were injured and maimed, and all just because the fire exits were chained". Mr Justice Murphy ordered the Ordinary Man album to be withdrawn from the shops, and costs were awarded against Moore. "Another Song Is Born" was recorded for the album's re-release, and "They Never Came Home" later appeared in his box set and on the album Where I Come From.

In 2024, the jury at the Stardust tribunal found that at the time of the fire, one exit was locked and blocked from the outside by a parked van; another exit was unlocked but had chains across the panic bar which gave the impression that it was locked to those inside; another exit was partially blocked by a portable stage; and one exit had been locked, but was unlocked by a bouncer who then wedged the door open with a doormat, after the fire alarm went off. The doormat became dislodged and the doors closed, and had to be forced open from the inside.

== Memorable events ==
=== Detention incident, 2004 ===
In October 2004, Moore was stopped and detained by Special Branch officers at the Welsh port of Holyhead, taken into an office and questioned about the lyrics of his songs. The following day he released a statement, saying: "My driver and I were stopped and held for two hours at Holyhead last Monday, under the Prevention of Terrorism Act 2002. My driver and I were held separately in two interrogation rooms. I found the whole experience threatening. I was questioned about the contents of my briefcase." Despite initial reports to the contrary, the singer's van, which was full of musical equipment, was not searched. "I was questioned about lyrics of songs and I was asked a lot of personal questions about members of my family and my children and about my home. At no time was I given any explanation as to why I was being held and interrogated in this manner." He said the fact that Irish people were still being treated like this on their way to Britain was very "saddening". "I had hoped to deal with this matter out of the public domain. But seeing as it has become a news item, I feel the need to offer my side of the story. I found the whole affair quite frightening."

=== Penguin book of Irish poetry ===
In 2010, Christy Moore's song "Lisdoonvarna", which he wrote, gained entry in The Penguin Book of Irish Poetry.

=== Postage stamp ===
On 15 July 2021, the Irish postal service, An Post, released a postage stamp celebrating Moore.

== Discography ==
=== Solo albums ===
- Paddy on the Road (1969)
- Prosperous (1972)
- Whatever Tickles Your Fancy (1975)
- Christy Moore (1976)
- The Iron Behind the Velvet (1978)
- The Time Has Come (1983)
- Ride On (1984)
- Ordinary Man (1985)
- The Spirit of Freedom (1986)
- Unfinished Revolution (1987)
- Voyage (1989)
- Smoke & Strong Whiskey (1991)
- King Puck (1993) No. 2
- Graffiti Tongue (1996) No. 2
- Traveller (1999) No. 1
- This Is the Day (2001) No. 1
- Burning Times (2005) No. 3
- Listen (2009) No. 1
- Folk Tale (2011)
- Where I Come From (2013)
- Lily (2016) No. 3
- Flying Into Mystery (2021)
- A Terrible Beauty (2024)

==== Live albums ====
- Live in Dublin (1978)
- Live at the Point (1994) No. 1
- Live at Vicar Street (2002) No. 1
- Live at the Point 2006 (2006) No. 1
- On the Road (2017) No. 1
- Magic Nights (2019) No. 2

==== Other ====
- H Block (1980)
- Christy Moore and Friends (1981)

=== With Planxty ===
- Planxty (1972)
- The Well Below the Valley (1973)
- Cold Blow and the Rainy Night (1974)
- After the Break (1979)
- The Woman I Loved So Well (1980)
- Words and Music (1983)

==== Live and compilation ====
- Live 2004 CD/DVD (2004)
- Between the Jigs and the Reels: A Retrospective CD/DVD (2016)

==== Other ====
- High Kings of Tara (1980)

=== With Moving Hearts ===
- Moving Hearts (1981)
- Dark End of the Street (1982)

=== Compilation albums ===
- Nice 'n Easy (1984)
- Planxty Arís (1984) (with Planxty)
- Christy Moore (Compilation USA)|Christy Moore (1988)
- The Christy Moore Collection 1981–1991 (1991)
- Christy Moore Collection Part 2 (1997) No. 4
- The Box Set 1964–2004 (2004) No. 2
- The Early Years 1969-81 (2020)

== Videography ==
=== Video ===
- Christy (1995) 54 mins – Christy reflects on his life and career.

=== DVDs ===
- Christy Moore Uncovered (2001) 104 mins – features collaborations with Jimmy MacCarthy, Wally Page, Shane MacGowan, Sinéad O'Connor and John Spillane.
- Live 2004 (Planxty DVD) The reunion of the hugely popular and influential group after a 20-year hiatus.
- Christy Moore Live in Dublin 2006 (2006) 143 mins – First time a live solo concert has been recorded and released outside CD format. Filmed over 4 nights in December 2005 and January 2006.
- Christy Moore's Come All You Dreamers – Live at Barrowland (2009) – Filmed in Barrowland in Glasgow featuring Declan Sinnott.

== Bibliography ==
- Moore, Christy (2000). One Voice: My Life in Song (1st ed.). London: Hodder & Stoughton. ISBN 978-0-340-76840-2.

== See also ==
- List of Irish musicians
