= John Spillane =

Irish singer-songwriter

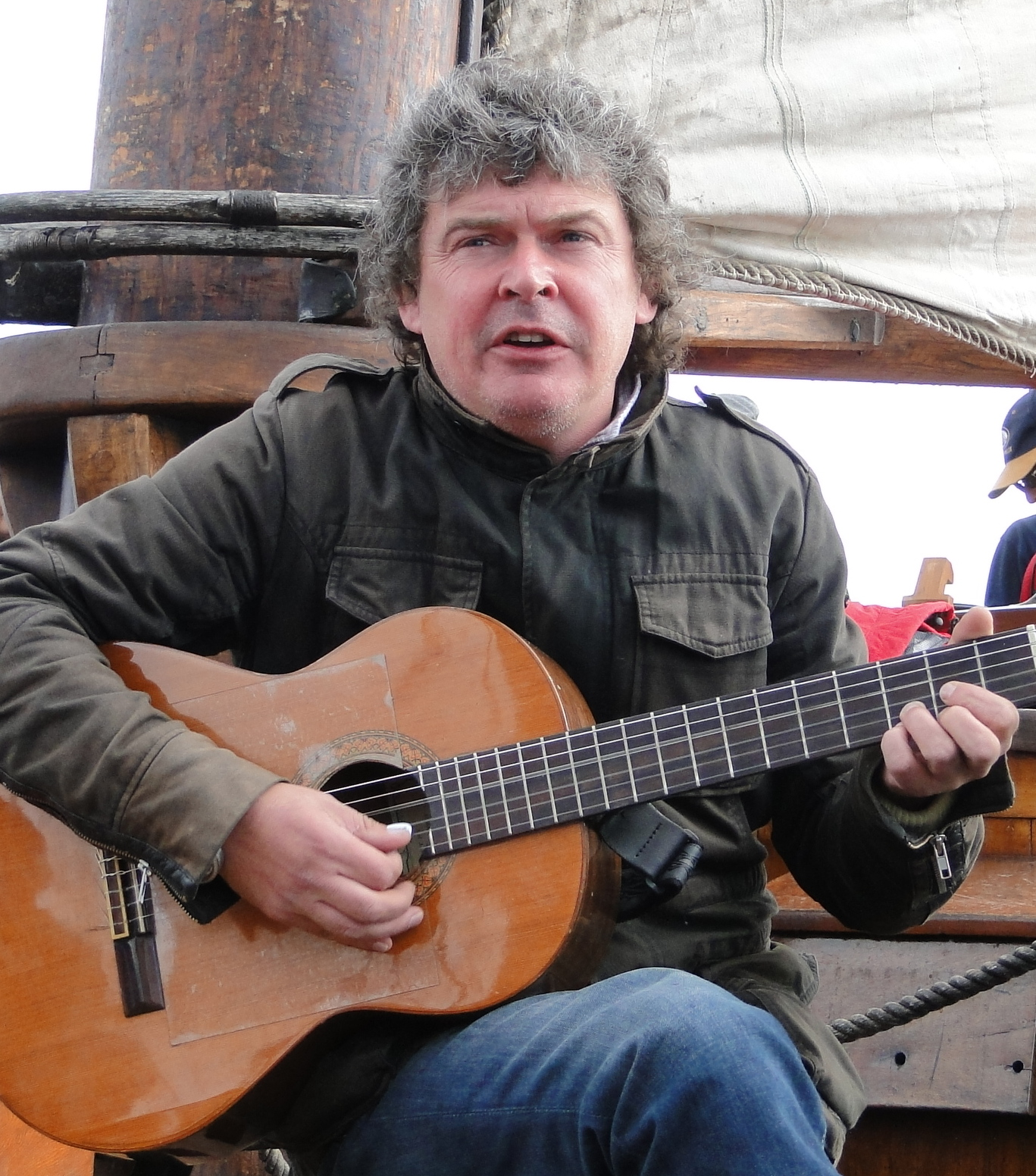
- Spillane at the 2010 National Celtic Festival in Portarlington, Victoria

Background information
- Born: 1961 (age 64–65); Cork, Ireland
- Genre: Folk
- Occupations: Singer, songwriter
- Instruments: Guitar, vocals
- Labels: EMI Ireland, Universal Ireland, Crashed Records
- Website: johnspillane.ie

John Spillane (born 1961) is a singer-songwriter from Cork, Ireland.

== Musical collaborations and beginnings ==
In Spillane's early career he was involved with several bands, most notably Nomos and the local jazz vocal group The Stargazers, with whom Spillane spent several years playing together with whistle player Noel Shine. It was at this time he studied at the UCC obtaining a degree in Irish and English.

Spillane toured with Nomos and contributed songs. Together they produced two albums: Set You Free and I Won't Be Afraid Anymore. Spillane then left to pursue a solo career.

== Celebration of the Irish language ==
Spillane is an advocate of the resurgence of the Irish language having released two albums almost entirely in Irish. The first being a collaboration with Irish poet Louis de Paor under the pseudonym "The Gaelic Hit Factory". The album of the same name was critically acclaimed and Spillane and De Paor combined their talents to win the Realta Irish song contest two years in a row. The second being the double platinum selling album Irish Songs We Learned at School, which was recorded with students from a school in Ballincollig and features thirteen traditional Irish songs. Spillane is noted to have followed the release (and continues to do so) with a school tour to promote the Irish language through music to young people. A song from the album was featured on the 2013 compilation album Larry Kirwan's Celtic Invasion.

== Spillane in Africa ==
In October 2007, when asked by TG4, Spillane filmed a twelve-day musical visit to Senegal in West Africa. It was part of a series called Ceoilchuairt which sent different musicians to different parts of the world to interact with musicians from different cultures and learn from them.

An excerpt from his journal describes an experience from that trip: "Another day found us on the Isle de Goréé, the chief station for the deportation of slaves from West Africa to the Americas. A World Heritage Site and a museum to the appalling history of man's inhumanity to man. "If all the sea were ink, and all the sky were made of paper, there would not be enough ink or paper to write down the human suffering caused by the Slave Trade." The show itself was repeated due to its popularity and Spillane has since collaborated with TG4 on a documentary about emigration.

== Instruments ==
Spillane has said that "my most treasured possession is my Spanish guitar, a Cabballero by Rodruigez, Guitarra de Artisania, Almansa, Espana".

== Discography ==
- The Wells of the World (1997)
- Will We Be Brilliant or What? (2002)
- Hey Dreamer (2005)
- The Gaelic Hit Factory (2006)
- My Dark Rosaleen & the Island of Dreams (2008)
- Irish Songs We Learned at School (2008)
- More Irish Songs We Learned in School (2009)
- Rock to Cling To (2011)
- Life in an Irish Town (2013)
- The Man Who Came in from the Dark (2014)
- 100 Snow White Horses (2021)

== Awards ==
=== Meteor Awards ===
Year	Nominee / work	Award	Result
2003		Best Folk/Traditional Act	Won
2006		Best Trad and Folk	Won
2006		Best Irish Male	Nominated
2009		Best Traditional/Folk	Nominated

== Session work ==
Spillane has worked on other people's recordings as a session musician over the years including:

- "Down To The Sea In Ships", Vincent P. Brophy, 1999. Spillane played whistle and bagpipes.
- "Since Then", Peter Baxter, 1995. Spillane played whistle, flagolet, bodhrán, percussion and harmonica.
