= Music and politics =

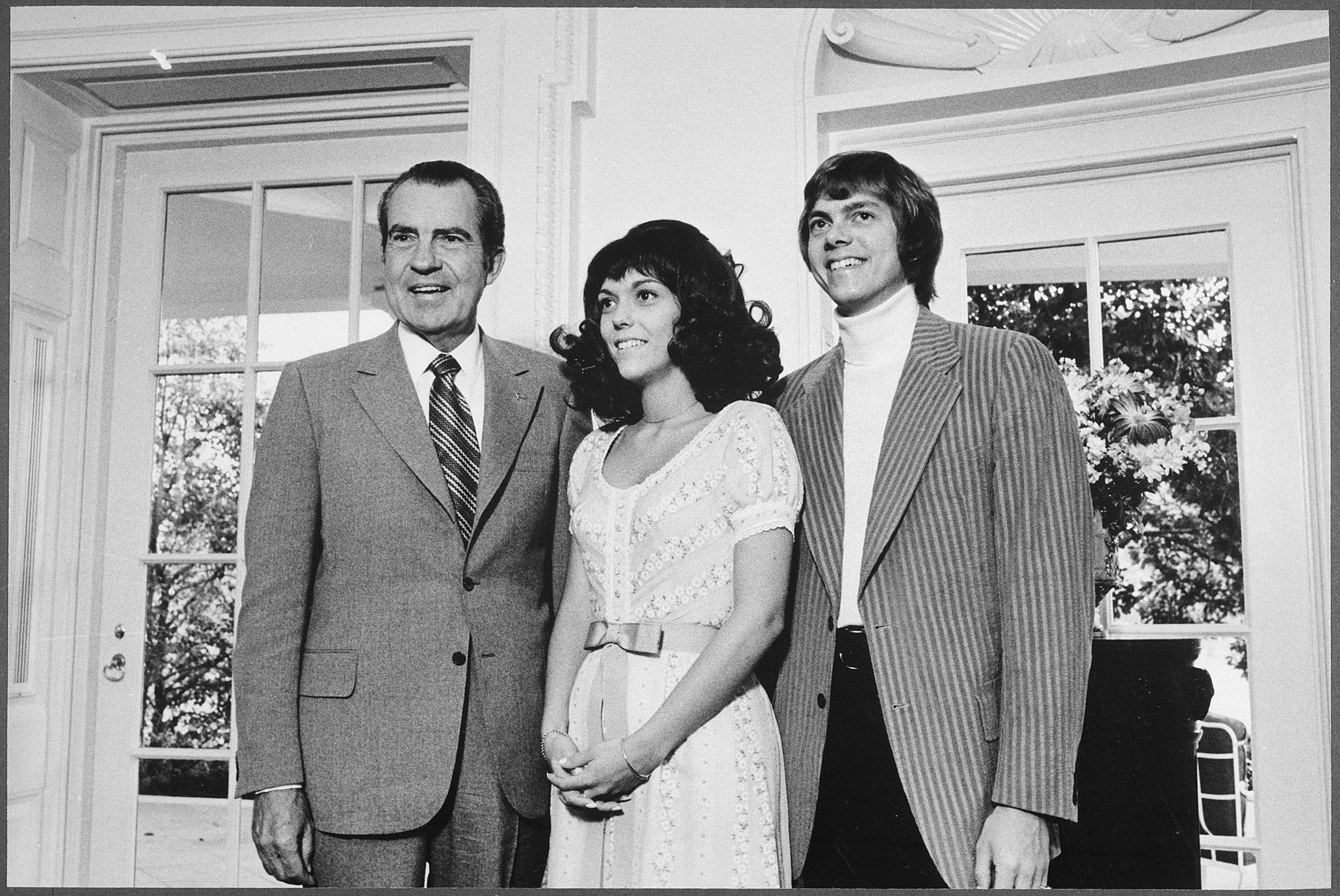
US President Richard Nixon with The Carpenters in 1972.

The connection between music and politics is poorly defined with some identifiable traits. They are typically made for a specific time and place, causing them to become irrelevant quickly. In more modern times, they are seen as addressing universal concerns or commonly shared problems.

== Introduction ==
In a study that used natural language processing, it was suggested that, comparatively to less charged music, political music lets listeners start a dialogue based on it.

Participants who engaged in the informed discourse about music are aware that it is not inherently political. If music listeners (including performers, composers, politicians and authorities who know music because they listen to it) "see" a relationship between certain music and politics, this is because, as a result of consequential logic, they attribute to this music the capacity to initiate certain (political) beliefs or behaviours in listeners.

In a 2014 review article, it was shown that political music is used for announcing, or calling for action. The same article states that this is because music is seen as a sign system.

Furthermore, some forms of music may be deemed political by cultural association, irrespective of political content, as evidenced by the way Western pop/rock bands such as The Beatles were censored by the State in the Eastern Bloc in the 1960s and 1970s, while being embraced by younger people as symbolic of social change.

It is difficult to predict how audiences will respond to political music, in terms of aural or even visual cues. Bleich and Zillmann found that "counter to expectations, highly rebellious students did not enjoy defiant rock videos more than did their less rebellious peers, nor did they consume more defiant rock music than did their peers", suggesting there may be little connection between behaviour and musical taste. Pedelty and Keefe argue that "It is not clear to what extent the political messages in and around music motivate fans, become a catalyst for discussion, [or] function aesthetically".

However, in contrast they cite research that concludes, based on interpretive readings of lyrics and performances with a strong emphasis on historical contexts and links to social groups, that "given the right historical circumstances, cultural conditions, and aesthetic qualities, popular music can help bring people together to form effective political communities".

Research that was done in 2012 has also suggested that music education has been used for the instilling patriotism in children, and that particularly during wartime, patriotic singing can escalate to inspire destructive jingoism.

Plato wrote: "musical innovation is full of danger to the whole state, and ought to be prohibited. When modes of music change, the fundamental laws of the state always change with them;" although this was written as a warning it can be taken as a revolutionary statement that music is much more than just melodies and harmonies but an important movement in the life of all human beings.

== Folk music ==
=== American folk revival ===
The song "We Shall Overcome" is perhaps the best-known example of political folk music, in this case a rallying-cry for the US Civil Rights Movement. Pete Seeger was involved in the popularisation of the song, as was Joan Baez. During the early part of the 20th century, poor working conditions and class struggle lead to the growth of the Labour movement and numerous songs advocating social and political reform. The most famous songwriter of the early 20th century "Wobblies" was Joe Hill. Later, from the 1940s through the 1960s, groups like the Almanac Singers and The Weavers were influential in reviving this type of socio-political music. Woody Guthrie's "This Land Is Your Land" is one of the most famous American folk songs and its lyrics exemplify Guthrie's socialistic patriotism. Pete Seeger's "Where Have All the Flowers Gone?", was a popular anti-war protest song. Many of these types of songs became popular during the Vietnam War era. "Blowin' in the Wind", by Bob Dylan, was a hit for Peter, Paul and Mary, and suggested that a younger generation was becoming more aware of global problems than many of the older generation. In 1964, Joan Baez had a top-ten hit in the UK with "There but for Fortune" (by Phil Ochs); it was a plea for the innocent victim of prejudice or inhumane policies. Many topical songwriters with social and political messages emerged from the folk music revival of the 1960s, including Bob Dylan, Joan Baez, Phil Ochs, Tom Paxton, Buffy Sainte-Marie, Judy Collins, Arlo Guthrie, and others.

The folk revival can be considered as a political re-invention of traditional song, a development encouraged by Left-leaning folk record labels and magazines such as Sing Out! and Broadside. The revival began in the 1930s and continued after World War II. Folk songs of this time gained popularity by using old hymns and songs but adapting the lyrics to fit the current social and political conditions. Archivists and artists such as Alan Lomax, Lead Belly and Woody Guthrie were crucial in popularising folk music, and the latter began to be known as the Lomax singers. This was an era of folk music in which some artists and their songs expressed clear political messages with the intention of swaying public opinion and recruiting support. In the UK, Ewan MacColl and A. L. Lloyd performed similar roles, with Lloyd as folklorist and MacColl (often with Peggy Seeger) releasing dozens of albums which blended traditional songs with newer political material influenced by their Communist activism.

In the later, post-war revival, folk music found a new audience with college students, partly since universities provided the organisation necessary for sustaining music trends and an expanded, impressionable audience looking to rebel against the older generation. Nevertheless, the rhetoric of the United States government during the Cold War era was very powerful and in some ways overpowered the message of folk artists, such as in relation to public opinion regarding Communist-backed political causes. Various Gallup Polls that were conducted during this time suggest that Americans consistently saw Communism as a threat; for example, a 1954 poll shows that at the time 51% of Americans said that admitted Communists should be arrested, and in relation to music 64% of respondents said that if a radio singer is an admitted Communist he should be fired. Leading figures in the American folk revival such as Seeger, Earl Robinson and Irwin Silber were or had been members of the Communist Party, while others such as Guthrie (who had written a column for CPUSA magazine New Masses), Lee Hays and Paul Robeson were considered fellow travellers. As McCarthyism began to dominate the United States population and government, it was more difficult for folk artists to travel and perform since folk was pushed out of mainstream music. Artists were blacklisted, denounced by politicians and the media, and in the case of the 1949 Peekskill Riots, subject to mob attack.

In general, the significance of lyrics within folk music reduced as it became influenced by rock and roll. However, during the popular folk revival's last phase in the early 1960s, new folk artists such as Bob Dylan and Phil Ochs began writing their own, original topical music, as opposed to mainly adapting traditional folksong.

=== Contemporary Western folk music ===
Although public attention shifted to rock music from the mid-1960s, folk singers such as Joan Baez and Tom Paxton continued to address political concerns in their music and activism. Baez's 1974 Gracias a la Vida album was a response to events in Chile and included versions of songs by Nueva Canción Chilena singer-songwriters Violeta Parra and Víctor Jara. Paxton albums such as Outward Bound and Morning Again continued to highlight political issues. They were joined by other activist musicians such as Holly Near, Ray Korona, Charlie King, Anne Feeney, Jim Page, Utah Phillips and more recently David Rovics.

In the UK, the Ewan MacColl tradition of political folk has been continued since the 1960s by singer-songwriters such as Roy Bailey, Leon Rosselson and Dick Gaughan. Since the 1980s, a number of artists have blended folk protest with influences from punk and elsewhere to produce topical and political songs for a modern independent rock music audience, including Billy Bragg, Attila the Stockbroker, Robb Johnson, Alistair Hulett, The Men They Couldn't Hang, TV Smith, Chumbawamba and more recently Chris T-T and Grace Petrie.

=== Ireland ===
In Ireland, the Wolfe Tones is perhaps the best known band in the folk protest/rebel music tradition, recording political material since the late 1960s including songs by Dominic Behan on albums such as Let the People Sing and Rifles of the I.R.A. Christy Moore has also recorded much political material, including on debut solo album Paddy on the Road, produced by and featuring songs by Dominic Behan, and on albums such as Ride On (including "Viva la Quinta Brigada"), Ordinary Man and various artists LP H Block to which Moore contributed "Ninety Miles from Dublin", in response to the Republican prisoners' blanket protest of the late 1970s. Earlier in the decade, The Barleycorn had held the #1 spot on the Irish charts for five weeks in 1972 with their first release "The Men Behind the Wire", about internment, with all profits going to the families of internees; Republican label R&O Records likewise released several records around this time to fundraise for the same cause, including the live album Smash Internment, recorded in Long Kesh, and The Wolfhounds' recording of Paddy McGuigan's "The Boys of the Old Brigade". The band The Murder Capital tackles anti-immigrant sentiment and the cost of living crisis with songs like "Love of Country". A trio from Belfast called Kneecap is known for rapping in Irish (Gaeilge) about a united Ireland, leading to major political statements at festivals like Coachella with pro-Palestinian activism.

=== Chicano folk ===
Chicano folk music has long been a platform for political resistance and social commentary. From the 1960s and onward, Chicano musicians used their music to express their personal experiences of discrimination and oppression faced as Mexican-Americans in the United States. Political themes like the fight for immigrant rights, labor struggles, Chicano identity, and police brutality have been common subjects of their music. Through their music, Chicano musicians have also encouraged community empowerment, activism, and unity throughout the development of the Chicano Movement. Joan Baez is the most recognized figure of this movement.

=== Folk music around the world ===
Folk music had a strong connection with politics internationally. Hungary, for instance, experimented with a form of liberal Communism in the late Cold War era, which was reflected in much of their folk music. During the late twentieth century folk music was crucial in Hungary, Romania, Czechoslovakia and Yugoslavia as it allowed ethnicities to express their national identity in a time of political uncertainty and chaos.

In Communist China, exclusively national music was promoted. A flautist named Zhao Songtim – a member of the Zhejiang Song-and-Dance Troupe – attended an Arts festival in 1957 in Mexico but was punished for his international outlook by being expelled from the Troupe, and from 1966 to 1970 underwent "re-education". In 1973 he returned to the Troupe but was expelled again following accusations.

An example of folk music being used for conservative, rather than radical, political ends is shown by the cultural activities of Edward Lansdale, a CIA chief who dedicated part of his career to counter-insurgency in the Philippines and Vietnam. Lansdale believed that the government's best weapon against Communist rebellion was the support and trust of the population. In 1953 he arranged for the release of a campaign song widely credited with helping to elect Philippine president Ramon Magsaysay, an important US anti-communist ally. In 1965, intrigued by local Vietnamese customs and traditions, and the potential use of 'applied folklore' as a technique of raising consciousness, he began to record and curate tapes of folk songs for intelligence purposes. He also urged performers such as Phạm Duy to write and perform patriotic songs to raise morale in South Vietnam. Duy had written topical songs popular during the anti-French struggle but then broke with the Communist-dominated Viet Minh.

== Blues and African-American music ==
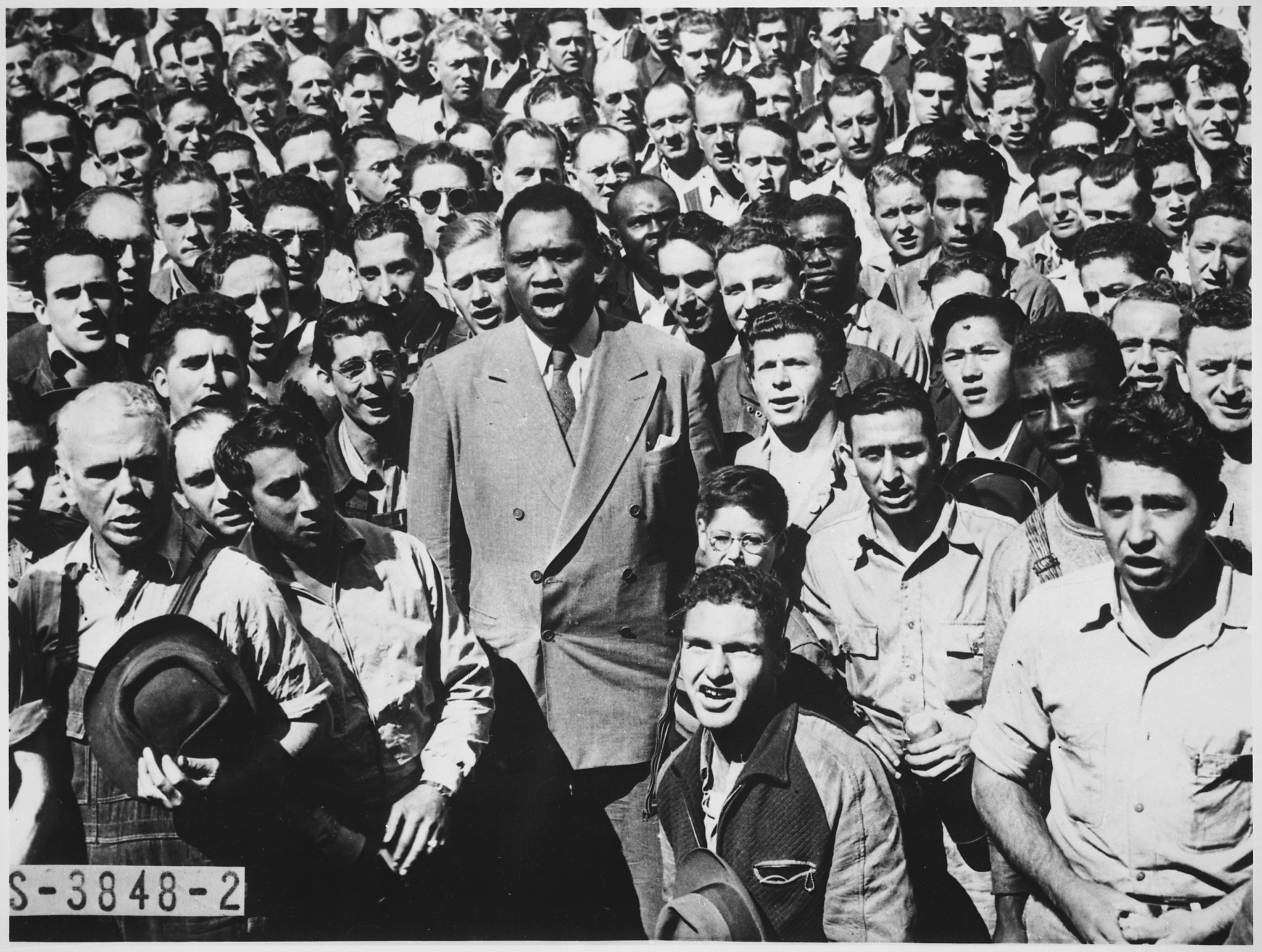
Paul Robeson singing "The Star-Spangled Banner" with shipyard workers.

Blues songs have the reputation of being resigned to fate rather than fighting against misfortune, but there have been exceptions. Bessie Smith recorded protest song "Poor Man Blues" in 1928. Josh White recorded "When Am I Going to be Called a Man" in 1936 – at this time it was common for white men to address black men as "boy" – before releasing two albums of explicitly political material, 1940's Chain Gang and 1941's Southern Exposure: An Album of Jim Crow Blues. Lead Belly's "Bourgeois Blues" and Big Bill Broonzy's "Black, Brown and White" (aka "Get Back") protested racism. Billie Holiday recorded and popularized the song "Strange Fruit" in 1939. Written by Communist Lewis Allan, and also recorded by Josh White and Nina Simone, it addressed Southern racism, specifically the lynching of African-Americans, and was performed as a protest song in New York venues, including Madison Square Gardens. In the post-war era, J.B. Lenoir gained a reputation for political and social comment; his record label pulled the planned release of 1954 single "Eisenhower Blues" due to its title and later material protested civil rights, racism and the Vietnam War. John Lee Hooker also sang 'I Don't Wanna Go to Vietnam" on 1969 album Simply the Truth.

Paul Robeson, singer, actor, athlete, and civil rights activist, was investigated by the FBI and was called before the House Un-American Activities Committee (HUAC) for his outspoken political views. The State Department denied Robeson a passport and issued a "stop notice" at all ports, effectively confining him to the United States. In a symbolic act of defiance against the travel ban, labour unions in the U.S. and Canada organised a concert at the International Peace Arch on the border between Washington state and the Canadian province of British Columbia on May 18, 1952. Robeson stood on the back of a flat bed truck on the U.S. side of the border and performed a concert for a crowd on the Canadian side, variously estimated at between 20,000 and 40,000 people. He returned to perform a second concert at the Peace Arch in 1953, and over the next two years two further concerts were scheduled.

=== Jazz ===
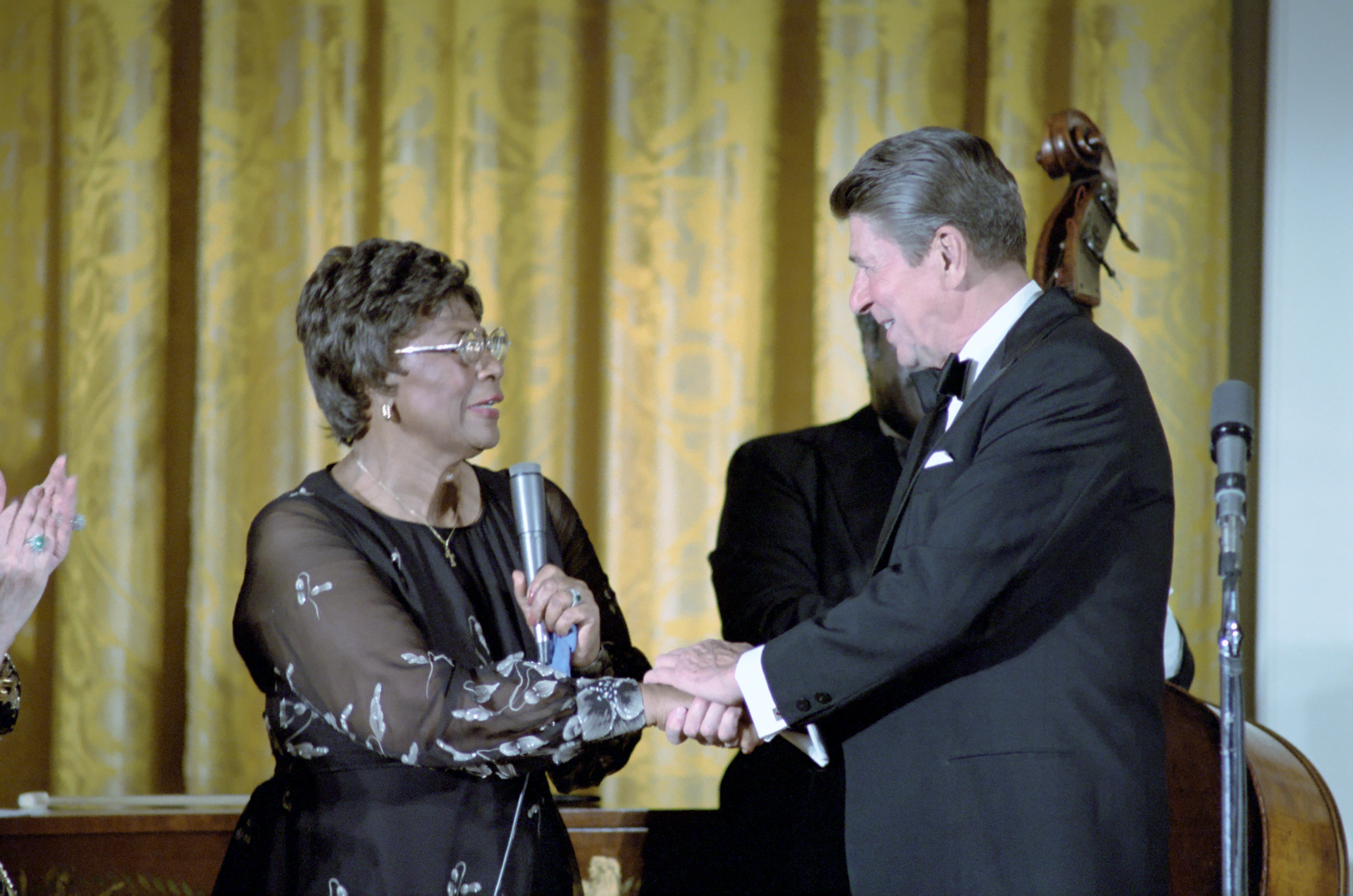
United States president Ronald Reagan with jazz singer Ella Fitzgerald in 1981.

The development of new genres of jazz through experimentation was inherently connected to the social movements of their respective times, especially during the Civil Rights and Black Power movements of the '60s and '70s. The development of avant-garde, free, and Afrofuturist jazz was heavily connected to the desire to break free from societal norms and express the desire for a free voice. The music was also grounded in the Black Nationalists movements, and through their music, artists sought to reconnect African Americans with the traditional sounds of their ancestors.

In the development of avant-garde jazz, mainstream jazz magazines and critics (predominantly owned and operated by White people) harshly criticized the music and framed it as incoherent. Unlike earlier forms of jazz, improvisation was central to avant-garde and many artists did not notate their music so that it followed a free expression of their emotions. However, as the mainstream jazz apparatus looked down upon Black musicians it praised White artists like John Cage. Cage and other musicians were heavily influenced by avant-garde sound, but their music was highly regarded by the media and hailed as genius. Black musicians strived to break new grounds in music through the development of jazz to create methods of expression and autonomy. Meanwhile, structures of power within the jazz industry continuously placed pressures on this "new thing" so that it would assimilate in to normalized cultural standards, thus destroying its significance as a call for social and political change.

The experimentation of certain artists, like Sun Ra, directly called for the liberation of the African American and a return to African traditions. In his Afrofuturist science fiction film, Space is the Place, Sun Ra creates a colony for Black people on a distant planet in the cosmos far away from the antagonisms of white society. This messaging remained consistent through Afrofuturist music as it contradicted Euro-American musical rules.

Unfortunately, the politics of jazz replicated the patriarchy of general society. Along with the portrayals of jazz as black music, it followed the belief that jazz experimentalism was masculine. Throughout jazz music and academia, women are left behind and forgotten despite the crucial role they play. For example, Alice Coltrane had a largely successful career by paving the way of new sounds through Far Eastern influences and spiritualism. Yet, many of her accomplishments were overlooked because her husband, John Coltrane, had a more "relevant" career. Gender and womanhood are simple social constructs, similar to race, that have been replicated to create a hierarchy in jazz and academia. Recently there have been calls to recognize the importance of Black women in the development of jazz as authors like Sherrie Tucker encourage readers to listen to the stylistic differences to understanding the role gender plays in jazz.

== Dance music ==
=== Disco ===
Disco, contrary to popular belief, originated in Black queer communities and offered these communities a form of salvation or safe haven from social turmoil during the 1970s, in the Bronx and other parts of New York. It was agreed by many members prominent in the Disco scene that the music was about love and the vitality of "absorbing the feeling", but the question regarding its political import received mixed responses. Although the songs themselves may not have explicitly made political claims, it's important to note that disco, for many, was a "form of escape" and noted a "dissolve of restrictions on black/gay people". The spirit of the 60s as well as the experience of Vietnam and black/gay liberation spurred the almost-frenzied energy pertinent in these discotheques. Not only did discos allow marginalized individuals an opportunity to express their sexuality and appreciate one another's diversity, they had the ability to influence popular music. Although once mutually exclusive, discotheques allowed for the coming together of black music and pop; this shows how disco music not only led to a social appreciation for diversity, but offered a platform on which Black artists could succeed. The eventual commercialization of disco set in motion its decline. This new commodified disco, very different than its diverse and queer roots, idealized the white individual and favored heteronormative relations. This not only allowed for the roots of such a diverse movement to be lost, but the erasure of the liberation and escapism it offered many minorities.

An example of a political disco anthem is Carl Bean's "I Was Born This Way", a defiant gay rights anthem by a preacher-activist, becoming a template for later LGBTQ+ anthems like Lady Gaga's "I Was Born This Way".

== Latin American music ==
Latin American music has been intertwined with politics across the years. 1950s, 1960s, and 1970s protest songs played a critical role in the fight against authoritarian regimes in countries like Chile, Argentina, and Brazil. Today, Latin American musicians continue to tackle pressing social and political issues like immigration, inequality, and corruption through their work. As economist and musician Sumangala Damodaran explains, lyrics intertwined with activism are shaping the vast region's political landscape, creating a repertoire of new genres, and inspiring new generations of artists to do the same.

Some notable political issues across the region include discrimination, toxic masculinity, and colonization. Musical artists from across Latin America have contributed to the fight political issues occurring in their specific countries, like Bad Bunny for Puerto Rico and Los Tigres del Norte for Mexico. Throughout history, artists across Latin America have used music as a political tool to bring awareness to social issues.

=== Nueva Canción ===
Nueva canción or "New Song" is a musical movement that emerged in Latin America in the late 1950s and early 1960s. In a Remezcla article, Julyssa Lopez discloses that the genre focused on socially and politically conscious lyrics, often addressing the oppression and inequality experienced by marginalized communities, especially the Indigenous culture. Global languages and cultures professor Robert Neustadt affirms that artists like Violeta Parra, Víctor Jara, and Inti-Ilimani used their music to speak out against censorship, state violence, and human rights abuses.

Nueva canción was relevant because it gave voice and visibility to social and political issues and provided a platform for marginalized communities to express their struggles and resistance through music. It also played a significant role in the fight against oppressive regimes and contributed to the development of cultural identity and social consciousness in Latin America.

=== Salsa ===
Salsa is most known for its rhythm and inclusion of various instruments. Cumbia is characterized by its energetic rhythm and fusion of African, Indigenous, and European influences. It has evolved over time, incorporating various musical styles and instruments, and continues to dominate dance floors in Latin America and beyond. Cumbia's relevance lies in its ability to bring people together, celebrate hybridity of the Latin American culture, while also serving as a marker of race and class differences in Latin American countries like Puerto, Rico, and Venezuela. Political themes in salsa have included racial discrimination, white supremacy, colonialism, sexism, homophobia, environmental disaster.

=== Reggaeton ===
As a musical genre born out of the Caribbean and Latin American regions, Reggaeton frequently engages with the tropes of other popular musical genres like love, money, and sexual conquests; but has also been used as a form of social commentary and has played a significant role in promoting social change. Reggaeton often addresses issues such as poverty, racism, police brutality, and political corruption in its lyrics. Additionally, many Reggaeton artists use their platforms to speak out against inequalities and social issues by organizing concerts, rallies, and charity events to raise awareness and funds for various social justice causes. Reggaeton also serves as a vehicle for empowering marginalized communities, particularly Black communities, Latin American people, women, and the LGBTQ+ community. Throughout its history, people have come to believe Reggaeton has become more than just a music genre but a voice for social justice and activism.

==== Bad Bunny ====
Bad Bunny, whose real name is Benito Antonio Martinez Ocasio, is a Puerto Rican singer, rapper, and songwriter. He is known for his multiple chart-topping hits like "Titi Me Pregunto," "DÁKITI", "Yonaguni," and "Callaita." He was also the most listened-to artist in 2022. Additionally, Bad Bunny is recognized for his various awards, record-breaking achievement, and collaborations with major artist around the world.

One of his music videos, "Yo Perreo Sola", translating to I twerk alone, from his second album YHLQMDLG caused controversy as he dressed up in 3 drag outfits. His music video became the most-watched Latin music video in 2020.

In one of his recent albums, Un Verano Sin Ti, released May 2022, the 16th track was named "El Apagón," translated to "The Blackout." Rather than just releasing a music video, he worked with Puerto Rican reporter Bianca Graulau to produce a 18-minute documentary about the impact of US colonialism on the island and the displacement of Puerto Ricans. The documentary, "El Apagón" functions as a political statement from Puerto Rico about the ongoing modern-day colonization of the island, which has been happening since 1917. The song was inspired by Act 22, which is a law passed in the United States after Hurricane Maria which offered tax incentives to people in the US relocating to Puerto Rico. The law allows U.S. citizens to avoid paying taxes on their property, income, and wealth in Puerto Rico if they become bona fide residents. To qualify as a bona fide resident, a person must be a U.S. citizen who actively earns income from another country, has no intention of moving back to the United States, and has a permanent address in the other country.

It caused many millionaires and investors to buy multiple properties on the island, which has led to the displacement of many Puerto Ricans from their homes. The law was intended to improve the economy, but it has failed to do so.

==== Ivy Queen ====
Ivy Queen, also known as "La Reina del Reggaetón" (The Queen of Reggaeton), has been a prominent figure in Latin music since the beginning of her musical career in 1995. Throughout her career, she has produced hits like "Quiero Bailar" and "Quiero Saber" while also using her platform to advocate for social justice, particularly by creating narrative-based lyrics and videos exploring topics mentioning femininity, domestic violence, inequality, and sexuality. Gender and Women's studies scholar Dana E. Goldman explains that Ivy Queen's engagement with gender throughout her lyrics encourages dialogue to challenge gender norms, especially since male singers tend to perform Reggaeton more frequently and often express a desire for unattainable women or lament heartbreak.

=== Regional Mexican Music ===
Regional Mexican music encompasses diverse Spanish language genres originating in Mexico, such as mariachi, banda, duranguense, nortenos, grupo, corridos, and more. These genres hold significant popularity among Spanish-speaking audiences. They are deeply rooted in Mexican identity and cultural traditions. Each genre serves as a platform for various forms of activism, addressing issues such as gun violence, immigration, drug crime, governmental matters in Mexico and the United States, and corruption through their powerful lyrics.

==== Los Tigres Del Norte ====
Los Tigres Del Norte is California-based norteño musical group that has used their platform on a variety of issues. The group consisted of four brothers and their cousin. Originally undocumented immigrants, they formed the group in 1968 while residing in San Jose, California. They initially arrived in the United States with temporary visas to perform for incarcerated individuals, which marked the beginning of their journey as a grupo.

In 2013, Los Tigres del Norte, the renowned musical group, took the spotlight at a significant immigration rally in Washington D.C., advocating for immigration reform. During the rally, they performed their popular songs "La Jaula de Oro," "Vivir En Las Sombras," and "Tres Veces Mojado." It's worth noting that this rally was not their only one, as they also organized an immigration rally at the National Mall in Hollywood in October of the same year. During the rally, their aim was to consistently address their themes. After each song, they engaged in discussions to reflect upon the messages conveyed.

One of their biggest hits is "La Jaula de Oro," meaning "The Gilded Cage." This song has been performed numerous times and delves into the life of an immigrant and their American-born child who feels disconnected from their cultural heritage. The powerful message conveyed is, "What value does money hold when I feel trapped in this promising nation?"

Los Tigres Del Norte also tackle the topic of prison reform in their music. In 2019, they gave a memorable performance inside Folsom Prison, located in California, which led to the creation of a song called "La Prisión de Folsom" (Folsom Prison). This performance was influenced by the legendary musician Johnny Cash. It is worth noting that the majority of the inmates present during the performance were Hispanic and Black, reflecting the demographic composition of the entire prison system. Los Tigres Del Norte documented their experience at Folsom Prison in a Netflix documentary titled "Los Tigres del Norte at Folsom Prison." The documentary explores the grupo's impact on inmates, both prior to and following their time in prison.

== Rock music ==
Many rock artists, as varied as Crosby, Stills, Nash & Young, Bruce Springsteen, Little Steven, Rage Against the Machine, Radiohead, Manic Street Preachers, Megadeth, Enter Shikari, Architects, Muse, System of a Down, Sonic Boom Six and Drive-By Truckers have had openly political messages in their music. The use of political lyrics and the taking of political stances by rock musicians can be traced back to the 1960s counterculture, specifically the influence of the early career of Bob Dylan, itself shaped by the politicized folk revival.

=== 1960s–1970s counterculture ===
During the 1960s and early 1970s counterculture era, musicians such as John Lennon commonly expressed protest themes in their music, for example on the Plastic Ono Band's 1969 single "Give Peace a Chance". Lennon later devoted an entire album to politics and wrote the song "Imagine", widely considered to be a peace anthem. Its lyrics invoke a world without religion, national borders or private property.

In 1962–63, Bob Dylan sang about the evils of war, racism and poverty on his trademark political albums "The Freewheelin' Bob Dylan" and "The Times They Are a-Changin'" (released in 1964), popularizing the cause of the Civil Rights Movement. Dylan was influenced by the folk revival, as well as by the Beat writers, and the political beliefs of the young generation of the era. In turn, while Dylan's political phase comes under the 'folk' category, he was known as a rock artist from 1965 and remained associated with an anti-establishment stance that influenced other musicians – such as the British Invasion bands – and the rock music audience, by broadening the spectrum of subjects that could be addressed in popular song.

The MC5 (Motor City 5) came out of the Detroit, Michigan underground scene of the late 1960s, and embodied an aggressive evolution of garage rock which was often fused with socio-political and countercultural lyrics, such as in the songs "Motor City Is Burning", (a John Lee Hooker cover adapting the story of the Detroit Race Riot (1943) to the 1967 12th Street Detroit Riot), and "American Ruse" (which discusses U.S. police brutality as well as pollution, prison, materialism and rebellion). They had ties to radical leftist groups such as Up Against the Wall Motherfuckers and John Sinclair's White Panther Party. MC5 was the only band to perform a set before the August 1968 Democratic Convention in Chicago, as part of the Yippies' Festival of Life where an infamous riot subsequently broke out between police and students protesting the April assassination of Martin Luther King Jr. and the Vietnam War.

Other rock groups that conveyed specific political messages in the late 1960s/early 1970s – often in regard to the Vietnam War – include The Fugs, Country Joe and the Fish, Jefferson Airplane, Creedence Clearwater Revival, and Third World War, while some bands, such as The Beatles, The Rolling Stones and Hawkwind, referenced political issues occasionally and in a more observational than engaged way, e.g. in songs like "Revolution", "Street Fighting Man", "Salt of the Earth" and "Urban Guerrilla".

=== Punk rock ===
Notable punk rock bands, such as Crass, Conflict, Sex Pistols, The Clash, Dead Kennedys, Black Flag, Refused, American Standards, Discharge, MDC, Aus-Rotten, Billy Talent, Anti-Flag, and Leftöver Crack have used political and sometimes controversial lyrics that attack the establishment, sexism, capitalism, racism, speciesism, colonialism, and other phenomena they see as sources of social problems.

Since the late 1970s, punk rock has been associated with various left-wing or anti-establishment ideologies, including anarchism and socialism. Punk's DIY culture held an attraction for some on the Left, suggesting affinity with the ideals of workers' control, and empowerment of the powerless (though it is arguable that the punk movement's partial focus on apathy towards the establishment, combined with the fact that in many situations, punk rock music generated income for major record companies, and the notable similarities between some strains of anarchism and capitalism, meant that the punk movement ran contrary to left-wing ideologies) – and the genre as a whole came, largely through the Sex Pistols, to be associated with anarchism. The sincerity of the early punk bands has been questioned – some critics saw their referencing of revolutionary politics as a provocative pose rather than an ideology – but bands such as Crass and Dead Kennedys later emerged who held strong anarchist views, and over time this association strengthened, as they went on to influence other bands in the UK anarcho-punk and US hardcore subgenres, respectively.

The Sex Pistols song "God Save the Queen" was banned from broadcast by the BBC in 1977 due to its presumed anti-Royalism, partly due to its apparent equation of the monarchy with a "fascist regime". The following year, the release of debut Crass album The Feeding Of the 5000 was initially obstructed when pressing plant workers refused to produce it due to sacrilegious lyrical content. Crass later faced court charges of obscenity related to their Penis Envy album, as the Dead Kennedys later did over their Frankenchrist album artwork.

The Clash are regarded as pioneers of political punk, and were seen to represent a progressive, socialistic worldview compared to the apparently anti-social or nihilistic attack of many early punk bands. Partly inspired by 1960s protest music such as the MC5, their stance influenced other first and second wave punk/new wave bands such as The Jam, The Ruts, Stiff Little Fingers, Angelic Upstarts, TRB and Newtown Neurotics, and inspired a lyrical focus on subjects such as racial tension, unemployment, class resentment, urban alienation and police violence, as well as imperialism. Partially credited with aligning punk and reggae, The Clash's anti-racism helped to cement punk's anti-fascist politics, and they famously headlined the first joint Rock Against Racism (RAR)/Anti Nazi League (ANL) carnival in Hackney, London, in April 1978. The RAR/ANL campaign is credited with helping to destroy the UK National Front as a credible political force, aided by the support received from punk and reggae bands.

Many punk musicians, such as Vic Bondi (Articles of Faith), Joey Keithley (DOA), Tim McIlrath (Rise Against), The Crucifucks, Bad Religion, The Proletariat, Against All Authority, Dropkick Murphys and Crashdog have held and expressed left-wing views. Dead Kennedys singer Jello Biafra, as well as T.S.O.L. frontman Jack Grisham, have run as candidates for public office under left-wing platforms. However, some punk bands have expressed more populist and conservative opinions, and an ambiguous form of patriotism, beginning in the U.S. with many of the groups associated with 1980s New York hardcore, and prior to that in the UK with a small section of the Oi! movement.

An extremely small minority of punk rock bands, exemplified by (1980s-era) Skrewdriver and Skullhead, have held far-right and anti-communist stances, and were consequently reviled in the broader, largely Leftist punk subculture.

Washington D.C. became a cultural epicenter that fostered alternative punk rock. As a governmental and corporate location, it became all the more motivating for artists to build a punk scene. The pioneers of Washington D.C.'s punk scene in the 1970s were The Slickee Boys, Bad Brains, The Teen Idles, and The Enzymes.

Bad Brains was punk new wave rock and roll band inspired by the Sex Pistols. The guitarist, HR, created the positive mental attitude philosophy (PMA). This gave punk a reputation of positivity and innocence, allowing punk to gain traction. Popular songs by the Bad Brains include "Banned in DC" (2003) and "Rise" (1993).

==== Latino Rock/Punk ====
Music within the "Rock" genre have been linked to left-leaning political views, including views against racism and xenophobia. Latin punk became a movement within the Rock genre. Within the genre, issues that are prevalent specifically within the Latino communities were being discussed. The issues pertained to the violation of immigrant rights, including within the workforce. Many musicians within the genre paid homage to their cultural roots and adopted philosophies such as those that arose from the Zapatista Uprising.

The movement shed light on the Chicano/Latino scene within their communities. This became a form of protest against the xenophobia that exists against the community in the US

===== Rage Against the Machine and Tigres del Norte =====
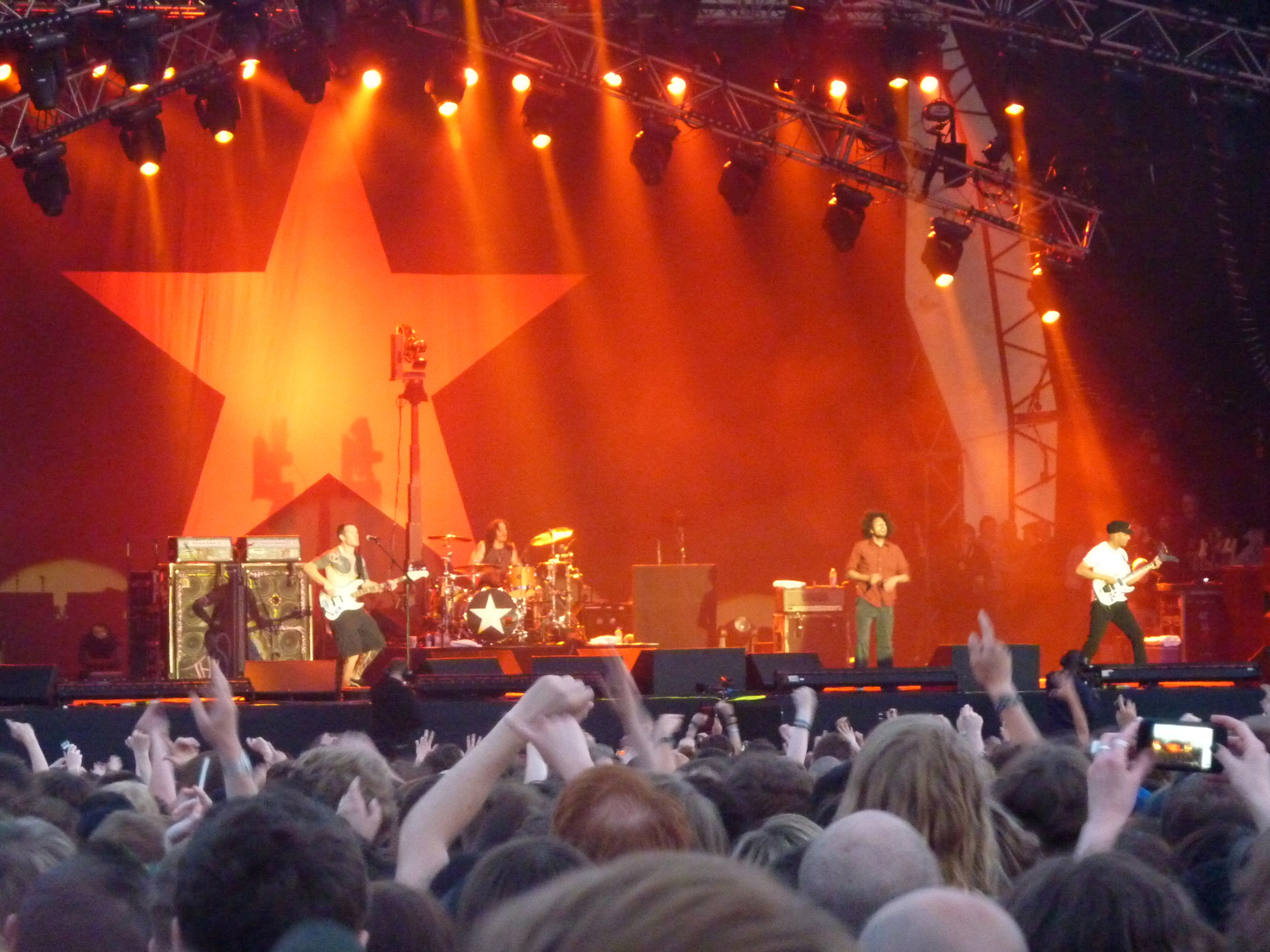
Rage Against the Machine performing in front of the flag of the Zapatista Army of National Liberation.

Lead singer of Rage Against the Machine, Zach De La Rocha is introduced by Los Tigres del Norte for their MTV Unplugged performance in 2011. Together, they perform a song of Los Tigres del Norte, ""Somos mas americanos." Zach De La Rocha is introduced as someone who "fights for the rights of us all." Rage against the Machine is known for having socio-political commentary in their music as well as Los Tigres del Norte. Rage against the Machine's "political views and activism are central to the band's message." Zach De La Rocha has described being interested in "...spreading those ideas through art, because music has the power to cross borders, to break military sieges and to establish real dialogue." Los Tigres del Norte also have a history of displaying their political views through their music. From supporting LGBT+ rights, prison abolition, and immigrant rights.

Together, they perform 'Somos Más Americanos.' Los Tigres Del Norte being Regional Mexican music that dates back to the 60s while Zach's musical background coming from a heavy metal and rap background which originated in the 90s.

The performance gives historical and social commentary on the xenophobia and racism that is targeted against Mexican and Chicanx folks in the US. Both the group and Zach perform the song whilst adding anedoctes about the US government.

One of the introductory lyrics in the song is "I have to remind them that I didn't cross the border, the border crossed me." These words directly reference US and Mexico history. Specifically to how a significant amount of what is now considered the Southwest US, was once Mexico. These words have also become a slogan for many Latino movements and organizations in the US who aim to fight against xenophobic systems that target immigrants. The lyrics that end the song are "Somos mas americanos que todititos los Gringos." Meaning, "we are more American than all of the White people."

=== Rock the Vote ===
Rock the Vote is an American 501(c)(3) non-profit, non-partisan organization founded in Los Angeles in 1990 by Jeff Ayeroff for the purposes of political advocacy. Rock the Vote works to engage youth in the political process by incorporating the entertainment community and youth culture into its activities. Rock the Vote's stated mission is to "build the political clout and engagement of young people in order to achieve progressive change in our country."

== Hip-hop ==
Hip-hop music has been associated with protest since 1982, when "The Message" by Grandmaster Flash and the Furious Five became known as the first prominent rap record to make a serious "social statement". However the first political rap release has been credited to Brother D and the Collective Effort's 1980 single "How We Gonna Make the Black Nation Rise?" which called the USA a "police state" and rapped about historical injustices such as slavery and ethnic cleansing.

Later in the decade hip-hop band Public Enemy became "perhaps the most well-known and influential political rap group" and released a series of records whose message and success "directed hip-hop toward an explicitly self-aware, pro-black consciousness that became the culture's signature throughout the next decade," helping to inspire a wave of politicised hip-hop by artists such as X Clan, Poor Righteous Teachers, Brand Nubian, 2 Black 2 Strong and Paris.

The group N.W.A had a political take within their songs. Their most controversial song, "Fuck tha Police", shone a light on police brutality and the use of racially biased tactics in Los Angeles during the '80s and '90s. Verses such as "Fuck the police, coming straight from the underground, a young nigga got it bad 'cause I'm brown, and not the other color so the police think they have the authority to kill a minority," led them to receive arrest threats for performing police-bashing songs. Their song Express Yourself addressed the restrictive limits on rappers in the industry; the video to the song expresses the view that black people have no voice and are punished when they speak up.

Eminem's tenth album, Kamikaze, contained many political messages, most of them revolving around his disapproval of Donald Trump being elected President of the United States. He stated he was willing to lose fans over this criticism and rapped: "And any fan of mine/who's a supporter of his/I'm drawing in the sand a line/you're either for or against,"

During Donald Trump's presidential campaign, Kanye West took the opportunity to support the Republican candidate by urging his fans to vote for Trump. Although West has historically been against the Republican administrations, he has been one of Donald Trump's most vocal supporters. On April 27, 2018, Kanye West and fellow rapper, T.I., released a collaboration called "Ye vs. the People" that consisted of West and T.I.'s opposing political views. The song, a conversation between the two rappers, became popular not for its musical touch, but because of the courage West and T.I. showed by releasing a controversial song in a time of high political disagreement.

== Reggae ==
Jamaican Reggae of the 1970s and the 1980s is an example of influential and powerful interaction between music and politics. A top figure-head in this music was Bob Marley. Though Marley was not in favor of politics, through his politicized lyrics he was seen as a political figure. In 1978 Bob Marley's One Love Peace Concert brought Prime Minister Michael Manley and the opposition leader Edward Seaga together (leaders connected to notorious rival gang leaders, Bucky Marshall and Claude Massop, respectively), to join hands with Marley during the performance; this was the "longest and most political reggae concert ever staged, and one of the most remarkable musical events recorded." Throughout this period many reggae musicians played for and spoke or sung in support of Manley's People's National Party, a campaign credited with helping the PNP's victory in the 1972 and 1976 elections.

== Popular music ==
Popular music found throughout the world contains political messages such as those concerning social issues and racism. For example, Lady Gaga's song "Born This Way" has often been known as the international gay anthem, as it discusses homosexuality in a positive light and expresses the idea that it is natural. Furthermore, the natural disaster of Hurricane Katrina received a great political response from the hip-hop community. The content of the music changed into a response showing the complex dynamic of the community, especially the black community, while also acting a sometimes contradictory protest of how the disaster was handled in the aftermath. This topic even reached beyond the locality of New Orleans, as the issue of the disaster and racism was mentioned by other rappers from other regions of the country.

Pop music is common for its sensationalized and mass-produced uplifting beats. Many artists take advantage of their large followings to spread awareness of political issues in their music. Similar to Lady Gaga's "Born This Way," Macklemore's song "Same Love" also expresses support and homage to the LGBTQ+ community. Furthermore, Beyoncé's album "Lemonade" has been hailed as awe-inspiring and eye-opening with many of the songs addressing political issues such as racism, stereotyping, police brutality, and infidelity. These songs, aside from being catchy and uplifting, discuss serious issues in a lighthearted and simplified manner allowing people to understand while also commonly being influenced by the current political climate such as the violent attacks on the Bataclan Theater in Paris and the Pulse Nightclub in Orlando.

== Country music ==
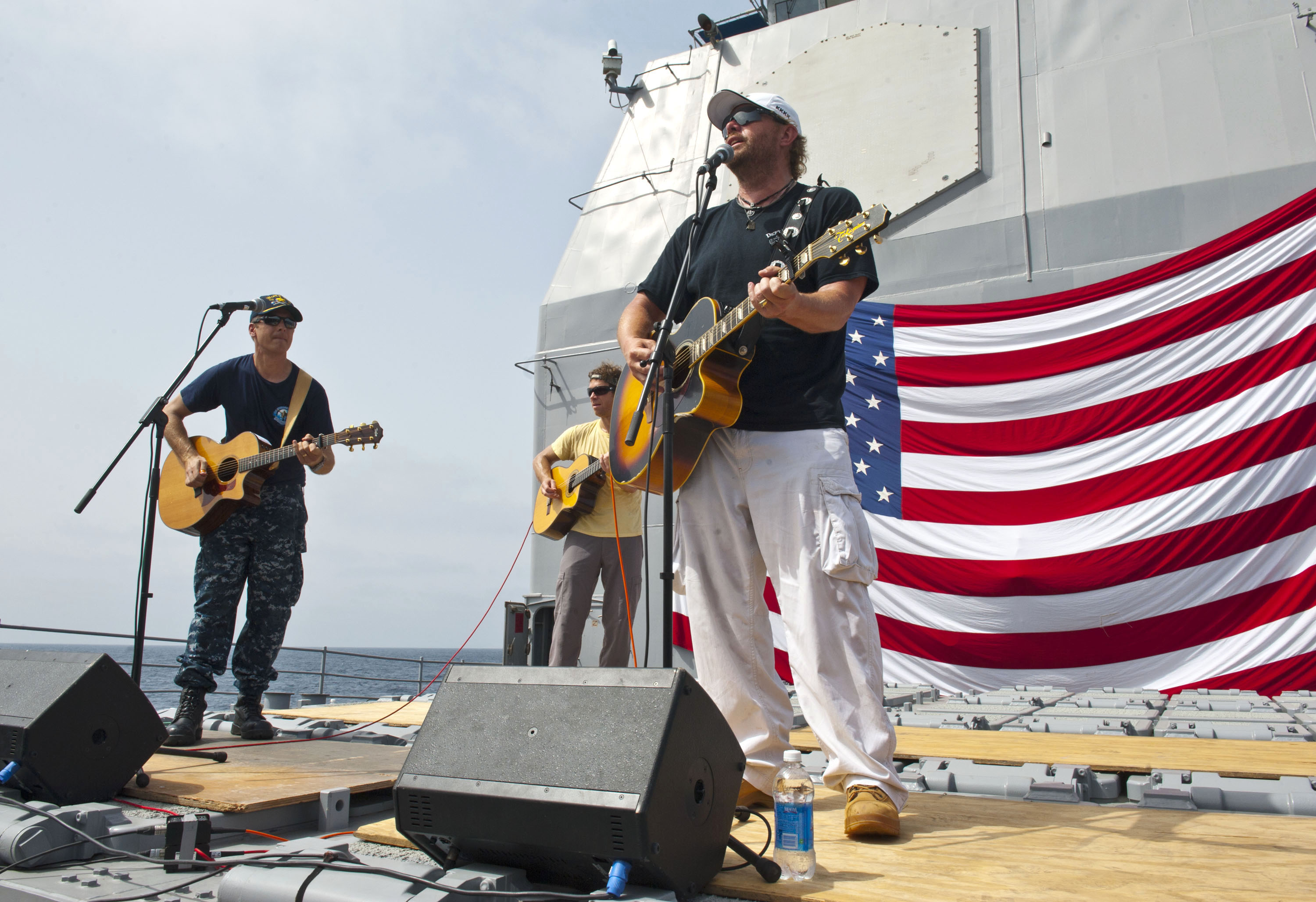
Country singer Toby Keith performing for US Navy personnel on the USS Cape St. George

American country music contains numerous images of traditional values and family and religious life, as well as patriotic themes. Songs such as Merle Haggard's "The Fightin' Side of Me" and "Okie from Muskogee" have been perceived as patriotic songs showing an "us versus them" mentality directed at the counterculture or "hippies" and the anti-war crowd, though these were actually misconceptions by listeners who failed to understand their satirical nature.

Many American country songs addressed political and cultural views in the 1960s and 1970s, with mainstream and independent country artists releasing singles that conveyed support for conservative candidates or military action, anti-communist statements, or, in some cases, anti-hippie sentiments often framed as humorous put-downs. These tropes have continued in such songs as Toby Keith's "Courtesy of the Red, White and Blue (The Angry American)" in 2002 and Bryan Lewis's "I Think My Dog's a Democrat" in 2016.

More recent American country songs containing political messages include Keith Urban's "Female" which details the psychological and emotional impact on women of sexist language, slut-shaming, and lack of representation in politics. The lyrics of Carrie Underwood's 2018 song "Love Wins" also identifies themes of prejudice, hatred, and politics. Through this song, Underwood expresses the idea that the best way to close the political divide and strengthen what she sees to be a broken world is through unity, loving each other, and working together in times of crisis.

Country artist Kacey Musgraves integrates politics into her lyrics, speaking about gay rights and cannabis consumption. Her song "Follow Your Arrow" is considered to be a radical perspective on same-sex marriage, in that it differs from the conservative point of view that is normally found in country music.

African American country rapper Cowboy Troy, the stage name of Troy Lee Coleman III, incorporates real-life problems into his music, calling for societal change. He sheds light on concepts like class analysis, gender issues, and popular narratives about the "white" working class. One of his songs, "I Play Chicken With The Train," acknowledges conservative and progressive ideas that tend to be brought up in presidential elections.

Although race is a rarely addressed topic in country music, some artists have made an effort to approach this theme in their songs. Brad Paisley's 2013 album Wheelhouse included the track "Accidental Racist", which became controversial, generating many negative reviews. Will Hermes, in his critique in Rolling Stone, commented: "It's probably not going to win any awards for songcraft and rapping, but in the wake of movies like Django Unchained and Lincoln, it shows how fraught racial dialogue remains in America." Paisley stated, "This song was meant to generate discussion among the people who listen to my albums."

== Classical music ==
Beethoven's third symphony was originally called "Bonaparte". In 1804 Napoleon crowned himself emperor, whereupon Beethoven rescinded the dedication. The symphony was renamed "Heroic Symphony composed to Celebrate the Memory of a Great Man".

Verdi's chorus of Hebrew slaves in the opera Nabucco is a kind of rallying-cry for Italians to throw off the yoke of Austrian domination (in the north) and French domination (near Rome)—the "Risorgimento". Following unification, Verdi was awarded a seat in the national parliament.

In late nineteenth century England, choral music was performed by mass choirs of workers and much music was written for them, by, for example, Samuel Coleridge-Taylor and Ralph Vaughan Williams. When the young Vaughan Williams wondered what kind of music to write, Hubert Parry advised him to "write choral music as befits an Englishman and a democrat". Others, including Frederick Delius and Vaughan Williams's friend Gustav Holst also wrote choral works, often using the words of Walt Whitman.

Richard Taruskin of the University of California accused John Adams of "romanticizing terrorists" in his opera The Death of Klinghoffer (1991).

American classical composer Miguel del Aguila has written over 130 works many of which center on social issues such as the genocide of Native Americans during the European conquest, and the Guerra Sucia victims. More recent works like Bindfold Music deal with social injustice in contemporary US society.

=== In the Soviet Union ===
RAPM (The Russian Association of Proletarian Musicians) was formed in the early 1920s. In 1929 Stalin gave them his backing. Shostakovich had dedicated his first symphony to Mikhail Kvadri. In 1929 Kvardi was arrested and executed. In an article in The Worker and the Theatre, Shostakovich's Tahiti Trot (used with the ballet The Golden Age) was criticised; Ivan Yershov claimed it was part of "ideology harmful to the proletariat"". Shostakovich's response was to write his third symphony, The First of May (1929) to express "the festive mood of peaceful construction".

Prokofiev wrote music to order for the Soviet Union, including Cantata for the 20th Anniversary of the October Revolution (1937). Khachaturian's ballet Spartacus (1954/6) concerns gladiator slaves who rebel against their former Roman masters. It was seen as a metaphor for the overthrow of the Czar. Similarly Prokofiev's music for the film Alexander Nevsky concerns the invasion of Teutonic knights into the Baltic States. It was seen as a metaphor for the Nazi invasion of the USSR. In general Soviet music was neo-romantic while Fascist music was neo-classical.

=== Music in Nazi Germany ===
Stravinsky stated in 1930, "I don't believe anyone venerates Mussolini more than I"; however by 1943 Stravinsky was banned in Nazi Germany because he had chosen to live in the USA. Beginning in 1940, Carl Orff's cantata Carmina Burana was performed at Nazi Party functions, and acquired the status of a quasi-official anthem. In 1933 Berlin Radio issued a formal ban on the broadcasting of jazz. However, it was still possible to hear swing music played by German bands. This was because of the moderating influence of Goebbels, who knew the value of entertaining the troops. In the period 1933–45 the music of Gustav Mahler, a Jewish Austrian, virtually disappeared from the concert performances of the Berlin Philharmonic. Richard Strauss's opera Die Schweigsame Frau (The Silent Woman) was banned from 1935 to 1945 because the librettist, Stefan Zweig, was a Jew.

== White Power music ==
Racist music or white power music is music associated with and promoting neo-Nazism and white supremacy ideologies. Although musicologists point out that many, if not most early cultures had songs to promote themselves and denigrate any perceived enemies, the origins of Racist music is traced to the 1970s. By 2001 there were many music genres with 'white power rock' the most commonly represented band type, followed by National Socialist black metal. 'Racist country music' is mainly an American phenomena while Germany, Great Britain, and Sweden have higher concentration of white power bands. Other music genres include 'fascist experimental music' and 'racist folk music'. Contemporary white-supremacist groups include "subcultural factions that are largely organized around the promotion and distribution of racist music." According to the Human Rights and Equal Opportunity Commission "racist music is principally derived from the far-right skinhead movement and, through the internet, this music has become perhaps the most important tool of the international neo-Nazi movement to gain revenue and new recruits." The news documentary VH1 News Special: Inside Hate Rock (2002) noted that Racist music (also called 'Hate music' and 'Skinhead rock') is "a breeding ground for home-grown terrorists." In 2004 a neo-Nazi record company launched "Project Schoolyard" to distribute free CDs of the music into the hands of up to 100,000 teenagers throughout the U.S., their website stated, "We just don't entertain racist kids ... We create them." Brian Houghton, of the National Memorial Institute for the Prevention of Terrorism, said that Racist music was a great recruiting tool, "Through music ... to grab these kids, teach them to be racists and hook them for life."

== By country ==
Aware of the motivational power of music, politicians across the world seek to incorporate different songs into their campaigns. However, the viewpoints of the musicians and the politicians using their music occasionally clash. In addition to protest songs created specifically to call attention to matters of social change, musicians around the world resist politicians. Governments and leaders also assert their resistance to critical musicians in a variety of ways. Within each different national and cultural context, musician resistance and politician response is a unique relationship.

=== Brazil ===
Since his election as the President of Brazil in 2018, Jair Bolsonaro had become an increasingly controversial leader. Much like rightist contemporaries Donald Trump and Narendra Modi, Bolsonaro has been described as both a populist and nationalist. While Bolsonaro directly supports far-right policies on gay rights and gun ownership, more moderate conservatives also claim that he supports their interests. To gain support from Brazil's conservative voters, Bolsonaro's speeches were heavily nationalistic and patriotic. While Bolsonaro's direct appeals to the people were more limited within his national addresses, he emphasized a prideful brand of Brazilian nationalism. As a figure whose policies and actions have been deeply polarizing and divisive, Bolsonaro became a main source of scorn and criticism for Brazilian musicians both domestic and abroad.

Musician Caetano Veloso, who was exiled during Brazil's military dictatorship that lasted from the 1964 to 1985, called Bolsonaro's heavy-handed nationalistic rhetoric and leadership "an utter nightmare." While Veloso's brand of music is not protest music, he takes the opportunity to speak out and use his visibility for resistance. In August 2020, Veloso joined a chorus of prominent Brazilian figures in mocking Bolsonaro for his perceived role in an embezzlement and money laundering scheme.

While some Brazilian artists like Veloso resisted mainly from their social media accounts, Brazil has a rich history of protest music against its former authoritarian dictatorship regime that is continued by many contemporary artists. Artists from all over the country had found ways to resist, criticize, and allude to Bolsonaro in their works. Troubadour Chico César took a direct approach by asserting that Bolsonaro's supporters were fascists, composer Manu da Cuíca veiled his criticism included a warning about Bolsonaro as one of the dangerous "gun-toting messiahs," and singer Marina Iris indirectly worked in criticism against the regime as persistent themes of angst and frustration toward the current state of Brazil. These customary forms of Brazilian music, rooted in indigenous musical forms, are a key form of anti-status quo music. In response to the resistance, instead of adopting music like Trump or relying on the support of his followers like Modi, Bolsonaro drastically cut the public support and resources for musicians, film-makers, and visual artists. Many artists viewed this act as payback for their resistance. However, several right-wing Brazilian rappers took it upon themselves in the music scene to defend and support Bolsonaro.

=== China ===
Political music in China (政治歌曲) consists of Patriotic Music (爱国歌曲) and Revolutionary Music (革命歌曲). It is an ideological music with political or nationalistic content, sometimes taking the form of a modernized Chinese traditional music written or adapted for some form of grand presentation with an orchestra. It was created in the early to mid-20th century, become the dominant genre of music after the Chinese Communist Revolution, and until the 1980s was the main form of music broadcast on radio and television in the People's Republic of China.

=== Ethiopia ===
Music and politics have been closely intertwined throughout the history of Ethiopia.

=== India ===
After the 2014 Lok Sabha election, Narendra Modi was sworn in Prime Minister of India. Modi, who is notable for this effective nationalistic appeal to the Indian people, quickly began to centralize power and subject both civil and foreign non-governmental organization to scrutiny.

With Modi's populist support and increasing governmental power, musicians face a unique social and political landscape in their options for resistance. In May 2020, an arrest warrant was brought against singer Mainul Ahsan Noble for making derogatory comments toward Modi on Facebook. While the lawsuit was filed by a private Indian citizen who "could not accept such defamatory remarks against the PM of [India]." With India's populist turn, criticism and resistance against politicians is now riskier for musicians. The late singer S.P. Balasubrahmanyam carefully resisted the actions of Modi when he suggested that artists from Southern India were subject to different restrictions than Bollywood artists at Modi's 2019 Change Within gathering. Where Noble's overt comments ignited anger and legal action, Balasubrahmanyam's muted criticism did not draw the same response. Because Modi's populist policy choices strongly suggest to the Indian people that he is concerned with welfare of the everyday citizen, more citizens come to his aid and resistance to Modi becomes more difficult for contemporary Indian musicians.

However, criticism of Modi may be less careful abroad. Desi-American punk The Kominas and several other South Asian performers organized an anti-Modi benefit in New York City to coincide with a Trump administration-organized, pro-Modi event in Houston. The New York City pro-Kashmir opposition event triggered attacks and condemnation from some Indians online, but no international legal actions against the bands and artists involved. Despite the opposition event highlighting human rights abuses regarding the military lockdown of Kashmir, the populist view of Modi as a purifier of corruption and defender of the Indian people persists among much of India. To further expand their musical acts of resistance, the Kominas are considering bringing the punk anti-Modi opposition events to different countries and even perhaps New Delhi.

=== Philippines ===
The different forms and trends of protest music against the Marcos dictatorship mostly first became prominent during the period now known as the First Quarter Storm, and continued until Ferdinand Marcos was deposed during the 1986 People Power revolution; some of the trends continued beyond this period either in commemoration of the struggle against the Marcos dictatorship, or in opposition to the political return of the Marcos family to a prominent place in Philippine politics.

=== South Africa ===
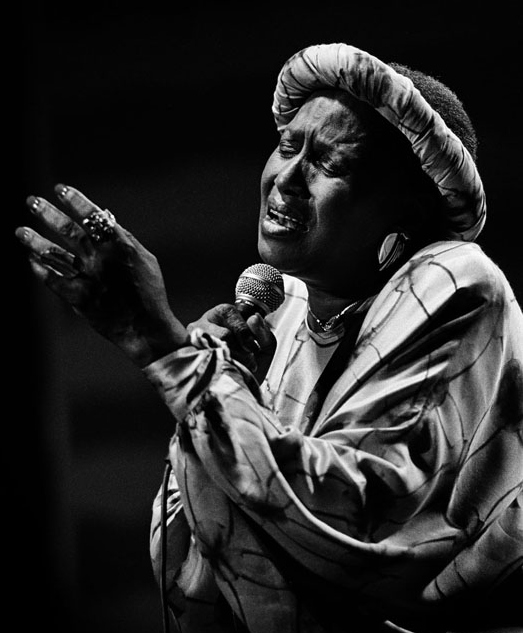
South African singer Miriam Makeba popularised a number of songs that protested apartheid.

The apartheid regime in South Africa began in 1948 and lasted until 1994. It involved a system of institutionalized racial segregation, violence, terror, and white supremacy, and placed all political power in the hands of a white minority. Opposition to apartheid manifested in a variety of ways, including boycotts, non-violent protests, and armed resistance. Music played a large role in the movement against apartheid within South Africa, as well as in international opposition to apartheid. The impacts of songs opposing apartheid included raising awareness, generating support for the movement against apartheid, building unity within this movement, and "presenting an alternative vision of culture in a future democratic South Africa."

The lyrical content and tone of this music reflected the atmosphere that it was composed in. The protest music of the 1950s, soon after apartheid had begun, explicitly addressed peoples' grievances over pass laws and forced relocation. Following the Sharpeville massacre in 1960 and the arrest or exile of a number of leaders, songs became more downbeat, while increasing censorship forced them to use subtle and hidden meanings. Songs and performance also allowed people to circumvent the more stringent restrictions on other forms of expression. At the same time, songs played a role in the more militant resistance that began in the 1960s. The Soweto uprising in 1976 led to a renaissance, with songs such as "Soweto Blues" encouraging a more direct challenge to the apartheid government. This trend intensified in the 1980s, with racially mixed fusion bands testing the laws of apartheid, before these were dismantled with the release of Nelson Mandela in 1990 and the eventual restoration of majority rule in 1994. Anti-apartheid music within South Africa faced significant censorship from the government, including through the South African Broadcasting Corporation; additionally, musicians opposing the government faced threats, harassment, and arrests.

Musicians from other countries also participated in the resistance to apartheid, both by releasing music critical of the South African government, and by participating in a cultural boycott of South Africa from 1980 onward. Examples included "Biko" by Peter Gabriel, "Sun City" by Artists United Against Apartheid and a concert in honour of Nelson Mandela's 70th birthday. Prominent South African musicians such as Miriam Makeba and Hugh Masekela, forced into exile, also released music critical of apartheid. This music had a significant impact on Western popular culture, contributing to the "moral outrage" over apartheid. Scholars have stated that anti-apartheid music within South Africa, although it received less attention worldwide, played an equally important role in putting pressure on the South African government.

=== United States ===
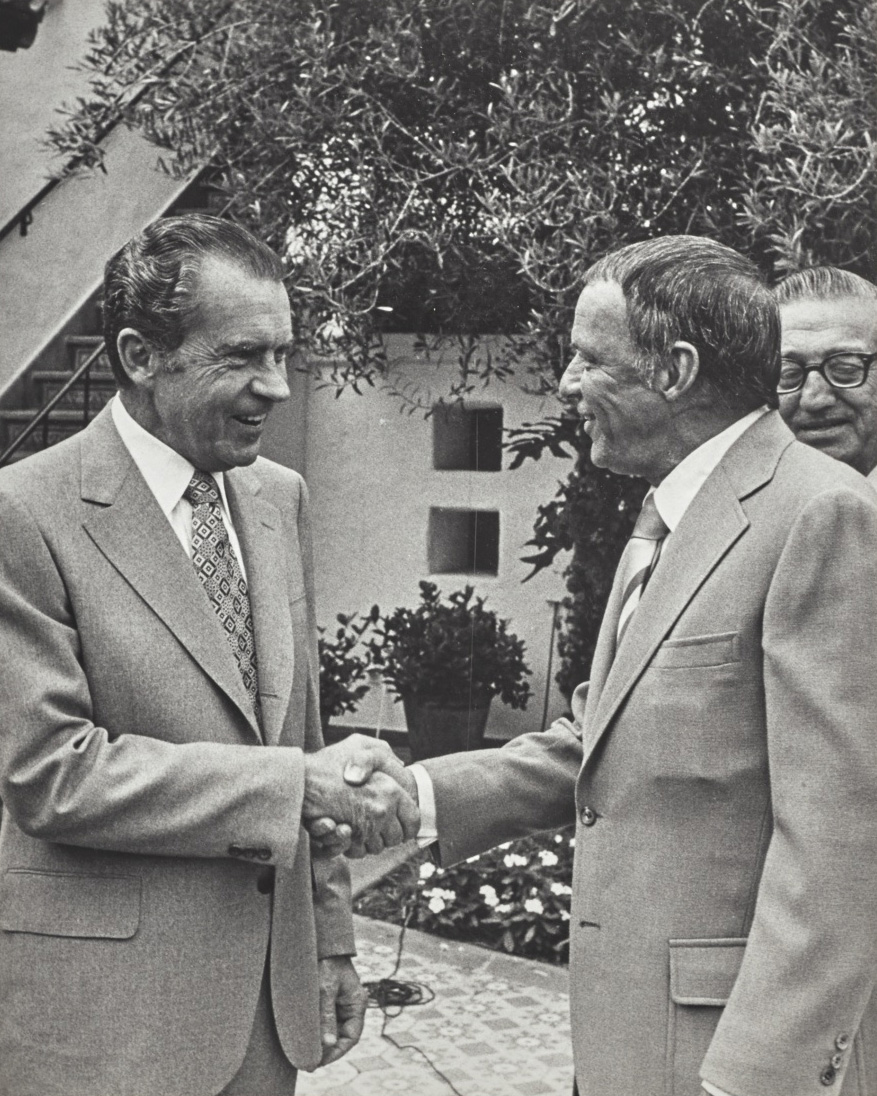
Richard Nixon with Frank Sinatra

In the United States, musicians including Victor Willis, Neil Young, the Dropkick Murphys and Explosions in the Sky have taken issue with or action against such politicians as President Donald Trump, Wisconsin Governor Scott Walker and Texas Senator Ted Cruz. These conflicts between popular musicians and politicians in the United States are common in the election cycle, but play out differently.

Trump used Young's song "Rockin in the Free World" from the beginning of his presidential campaign against Hillary Clinton in 2015. While Young argued Trump was not authorized to use the song in his campaign, a Trump spokesperson stated the song was legally obtained through a license with ASCAP and that the campaign "will continue to [use his song] regardless of Neil's political views." And though the song itself, from 1989, may appear to be an endorsement of the American lifestyle, closer examination reveals criticism of the George H. W. Bush administration. This suggests that the effect of music in a political campaign cannot be limited to lyrics alone. Despite the song's pointed words and Young's continued resistance, the Trump campaign began using the song again in 2018 in his presidential reelection campaign.

Similarly, in 2015, Scott Walker utilized the Dropkick Murphys' popular cover of Woody Guthrie's "I'm Shipping Up to Boston" at a political event in Iowa. Owing heavily to disagreements over issues like unions, the band tweeted "please stop using our music in any way ... we literally hate you!!!" to Walker. While there was no threat of legal action, the band took to social media to distance themselves from Walker and resist his usage of their song.

Some musicians have effectively used copyright law to resist the political use of their music. When Ted Cruz included the Explosions in the Sky song "Your Hand in Mine" in an endorsement video for Texas Governor Greg Abbott, the band tweeted they were "absolutely not okay with it." The band's label, Temporary Residence, forced the Cruz campaign to remove the video due to a violation of U.S. Copyright Law. Legally, politicians can license music without consulting the artists themselves through deals with performance rights organizations. Where the Trump campaign sidestepped consulting Young and legally licensed "Rockin' in the Free World" from such an organization (ASCAP), Cruz's effort did neither.

In the United States there is also a long and complex history of public schools instilling support for the military through their musical activities, and of music teachers either endorsing or resisting these tendencies. Musicologists have noted the impact of militarism in US society, arguing that "militarism endangers music education" and that although military models are inappropriate for the education of schoolchildren in a democracy, there is evidence that "In the United States, we find an array of music education partnership projects with the military that would be unthinkable in many other countries.

== See also ==
- Anarcho-punk
- Arsch huh, Zäng ussenander
- Birlikte
- Brexit in popular culture
- Crust punk
- Ecomusicology
- Environmentalism in music
- Freedom songs
- Hardline (subculture)
- Irish rebel music
- List of anarchist musicians
- List of anti-war songs
- List of national anthems
- List of socialist songs
- List of songs about the September 11 attacks
- List of songs about the Vietnam War
- Love Music Hate Racism
- March (music)
- Music and political warfare
- New musicology
- Nonviolent resistance
- Nueva canción
- Oi!
- People's Songs
- Political controversies in the Eurovision Song Contest
- Political song in Egypt
- Riot grrrl
- Rock Against Racism Northern Carnival
- Rock Against Sexism
- Role of music in World War II
- Stop Murder Music
- This machine kills fascists
- War song

== Sources ==
- Drewett, Michael (2003). "Music in the Struggle to End Apartheid: South Africa". In Cloonan, Martin; Garofalo, Reebee (eds.). Policing Pop. Philadelphia, Pennsylvania, USA: Temple University Press. pp. 153–165.
- Gilbert, Shirli (27 April 2007). "Singing Against Apartheid: ANC Cultural Groups and the International Anti-Apartheid Struggle" (PDF). Journal of Southern African Studies. 33 (2): 421–441. doi:10.1080/03057070701292848. S2CID 145605467.
- Schumann, Anne (2008). "The Beat that Beat Apartheid: The Role of Music in the Resistance against Apartheid in South Africa" (PDF). Wiener Zeitschrift für kritische Afrikastudien. 14 (8): 17–39.
