= List of number-one singles of 1970 (Ireland) =

This is a list of singles which topped the Irish Singles Chart in 1970.

Note that prior to 1992, the Irish singles chart was compiled from trade shipments from the labels to record stores, rather than on consumer sales.

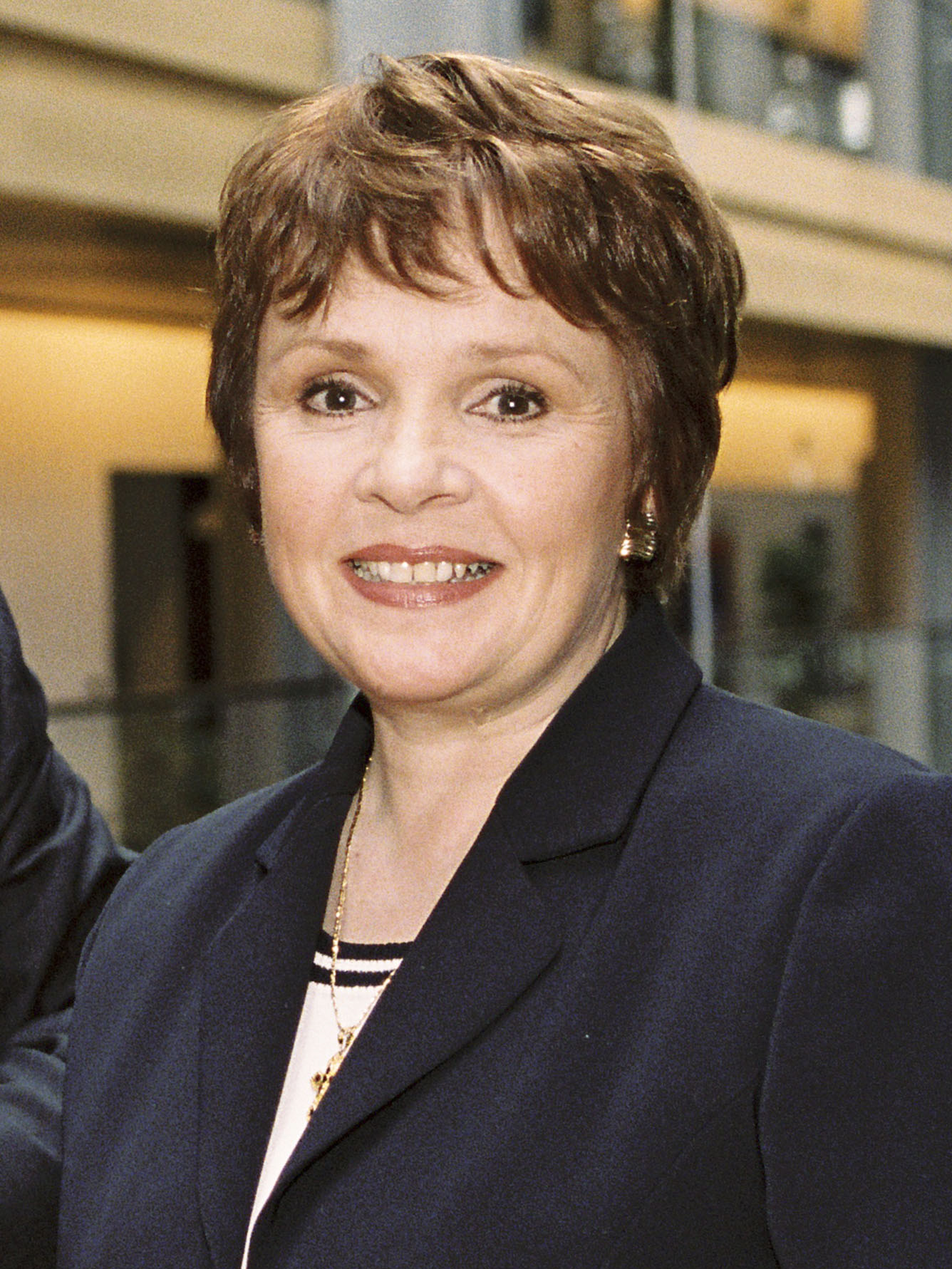
Dana spent Nine weeks at number one with her first number one All Kinds of Everything.

Issue date	Song	Artist	Ref.
2 January	"Two Little Boys"	Rolf Harris	
9 January	"Two Little Boys"	Rolf Harris	
16 January	"Two Little Boys"	Rolf Harris	
23 January	"Two Little Boys"	Rolf Harris	
30 January	"Two Little Boys"	Rolf Harris	
6 February	"Love Grows (Where My Rosemary Goes)"	Edison Lighthouse	
13 February	"Love Grows (Where My Rosemary Goes)"	Edison Lighthouse	
20 February	"Love Grows (Where My Rosemary Goes)"	Edison Lighthouse	
27 February	"Love Grows (Where My Rosemary Goes)"	Edison Lighthouse	
6 March	"Wand'rin' Star"	Lee Marvin	
13 March	"Wand'rin' Star"	Lee Marvin	
20 March	"All Kinds of Everything"	Dana	
27 March	"All Kinds of Everything"	Dana	
3 April	"All Kinds of Everything"	Dana	
10 April	"All Kinds of Everything"	Dana	
17 April	"All Kinds of Everything"	Dana	
24 April	"All Kinds of Everything"	Dana	
1 May	"All Kinds of Everything"	Dana	
8 May	"All Kinds of Everything"	Dana	
15 May	"All Kinds of Everything"	Dana	
22 May	"Spirit in the Sky"	Norman Greenbaum	
29 May	"Question"	The Moody Blues	
5 June	"Yellow River"	Christie	
12 June	"Yellow River"	Christie	
19 June	"Twenty One Years"	Dermot Hegarty and the Plainsmen	
26 June	"Twenty One Years"	Dermot Hegarty and the Plainsmen	
3 July	"In the Summertime"	Mungo Jerry	
10 July	"Goodbye Sam, Hello Samantha"	Cliff Richard	
17 July	"In the Summertime"	Mungo Jerry	
24 July	"In the Summertime"	Mungo Jerry	
31 July	"The Wonder of You"	Elvis Presley	
7 August	"Lola"	The Kinks	
14 August	"The Wonder of You"	Elvis Presley	
21 August	"The Wonder of You"	Elvis Presley	
28 August	"The Wonder of You"	Elvis Presley	
4 September	"Twenty One Years"	Dermot Hegarty and the Plainsmen	
11 September	"Twenty One Years"	Dermot Hegarty and the Plainsmen	
18 September	"Twenty One Years"	Dermot Hegarty and the Plainsmen	
25 September	"Which Way You Goin' Billy?"	The Poppy Family	
2 October	"Band of Gold"	Freda Payne	
9 October	"Band of Gold"	Freda Payne	
16 October	"Band of Gold"	Freda Payne	
23 October	"Band of Gold"	Freda Payne	
30 October	"Band of Gold"	Freda Payne	
6 November	"Band of Gold"	Freda Payne	
13 November	"New World in the Morning"	Roger Whittaker	
20 November	"New World in the Morning"	Roger Whittaker	
27 November	"I'll Forgive and I'll Try to Forget"	Margo	
4 December	"New World in the Morning"	Roger Whittaker	
11 December	"New World in the Morning"	Roger Whittaker	
18 December	"If Those Lips Could Only Speak"	Dermot Henry	
25 December	"I Hear You Knocking"	Dave Edmunds	

== See also ==
- 1970 in music
- Irish Singles Chart
- List of artists who reached number one in Ireland
