= Margo discography =

- Margo in concert.
- Studio albums: 22
- EPs: 6
- Compilation albums: 30
- Singles: 43
- Video albums: 6

Irish singer Margo released 22 studio albums, 30 compilation albums, six video albums, six extended plays, and 43 singles. She charted 13 songs on the Irish Singles Chart between 1968 and 1989, including the number one single "I'll Forgive and I'll Try to Forget".

== Studio albums ==
List of studio albums
Title	Details
Margo and the Country Folk (with the Country Folk)	Released: 1970; Label: Ruby; Format: LP
From Margo with Love...	Released: October 1971; Label: ARA; Format: LP
Country Lovin'	Released: January 1972; Label: ARA; Format: LP
...At Home in Ireland	Released: August 1973; Label: ARA; Format: LP
The Girl from Donegal	Released: 1975; Label: IRL, Release; Format: LP
Yes! Mr. Peters (with Larry Cunningham)	Released: December 1976; Label: Release; Format: LP
A Toast to Claddagh	Released: July 1977; Label: ARA; Format: LP
A Toast from an Irish Colleen	Released: August 1981; Label: Release; Format: LP
Ireland Must Be Heaven	Released: 1982; Label: Rosses; Format: LP
The Irish Songs I Love to Sing (Note: The Irish Songs I Love to Sing was reissued as The Girl from Donegal in the UK in May 1988 with four additional tracks.)	Released: 1984; Label: Smashed; Format: LP, cassette
Margo Now	Released: 1987; Label: Unicorn; Format: LP, cassette
A Trip Through Ireland (Note: A Trip Through Ireland was reissued in August 2010 under the title Ireland’s Where I Call Home.)	Released: 1989; Label: I + B; Format: LP
Ireland on My Mind	Released: 1992; Label: Ritz; Format: CD, cassette
New Beginnings	Released: 1994; Label: Ritz; Format: CD, cassette
Old Friends of Mine (Note: Old Friends of Mine was included as a bonus CD with the 2006 DVD Margo’s Ireland. When the album was reissued digitally it was re-titled Margo’s Ireland.)	Released: 1995; Label: Hazel; Format: CD, cassette
Old Friends Share Old Memories (Note: Old Friends Share Old Memories was reissued in 2002 under the title The Way Old Friends Do.) (with Philomena Begley)	Released: 1996; Label: Music Box; Format: CD, cassette
The Highway of My Life: Shade of the Family Tree	Released: 27 November 1998; Label: Tulip; Format: CD, cassette
I'm Still Here	Released: 27 June 2002; Label: Tulip; Format: CD, cassette
Parcel of Dreams	Released: 11 August 2006; Label: Celtic Arts; Format: CD, digital download
Stories in Song	Released: 13 August 2010; Label: Arran; Format: CD, digital download
The World Through My Eyes	Released: 14 July 2012; Label: Arran; Format: CD, digital download
The Promise & the Dream	Released: 19 September 2014; Label: Arran; Format: CD, digital download

== Compilation albums ==
List of compilation albums
Title	Details
Greatest Hits, Vol. 1	Released: December 1974; Label: ARA; Format: LP
Now & Then	Released: 1976; Label: IMS; Format: LP
Greatest Hits, Vol. 2	Released: November 1978; Label: ARA; Format: LP
Irish Startime (Note: Irish Startime was released under the title I'll Settle for Old Ireland c. 1981.)	Released: 1978; Label: Release; Format: LP
Irish Requests	Released: December 1979; Label: ARA, Outlet, Homespun; Format: LP
Country Style	Released: 1979; Label: ARA, Outlet, Homespun; Format: LP
Country Girl	Released: 1980; Label: Outlet, Homespun; Format: LP
Margo's Favourites	Released: 1980; Label: Harp, Pickwick; Format: LP
Three Leaf Shamrock	Released: 1980; Label: Homespun; Format: LP
Trip to Ireland	Released: 1981; Label: Homespun; Format: LP
Destination Donegal	Released: 1982; Label: ARA; Format: LP
18 Irish Songs	Released: November 1982; Label: ARA; Format: LP
Grádh Mo Chroí (I Long to See Old Ireland Free Once More)	Released: 1982; Label: Derry; Format: LP
The Margo Album	Released: 1982; Label: K-Tel; Format: LP
Share Our World (with Larry Cunningham)	Released: 1983; Label: Harp; Format: LP
The Heart That Beats in Ireland	Released: 1996; Label: Music Box; Format: CD, cassette
To My Children I'm Irish	Released: 1996; Label: Music Box; Format: CD, cassette
Tribute to Daniel O'Donnell	Released: 1996; Label: Music Box; Format: CD, cassette
The Margo Collection	Released: 1996; Label: Ritz; Format: CD
The Girl & Boy from Donegal (Note: Re-release of Margo's 1984 album The Irish Songs I Love to Sing (including the four additional tracks form the 1988 reissue) and Daniel's 1988 album The Boy from Donegal (which was recorded in 1984).) (with Daniel O'Donnell)	Released: 6 June 2002; Label: Prism Leisure; Format: CD
Two Sides of Margo	Released: 1 October 2006; Label: Arran; Format: CD, digital download
Country & Irish	Released: 27 July 2007; Label: AMC, Sony, CMR; Format: CD, digital download
Golden Favourites	Released: 27 June 2008; Label: Arran; Format: CD, digital download
Songs of Inspiration	Released: 5 June 2009; Label: Arran; Format: CD, digital download
Ireland's Showband Queens (with Philomena Begley and Bridie Gallagher)	Released: 5 March 2009; Label: IML Music Licensing; Format: CD, digital download
Margo & Friends	Released: 5 August 2011; Label: Arran; Format: CD, digital download
Songs for Mother	Released: 8 March 2012; Label: Arran; Format: CD, digital download
50 Songs 50 Years	Released: 7 March 2014; Label: Celtic Airs; Format: CD, digital download
Old & New	Released: 1 February 2019; Label: Crashed; Format: CD, digital download
70 Songs	Released: 8 April 2022; Label: Crashed; Format: CD, digital download

== Video albums ==
List of video albums
Title	Details
A Musical Journey (Note: A Musical Journey was reissued on DVD in 2011.)	Released: 1989; Label: I + B; Format: VHS
Old Friends Share Old Memories (Note: Old Friends Share Old Memories was reissued on VHS and DVD in 2002 as The Way Old Friends Do.) (with Philomena Begley)	Released: 1996; Label: Music Box; Format: VHS
Margo's Ireland	Released: October 2006; Label: Arran, CMP, Sony; Format: DVD + CD
Margo Live	Released: 30 September 2014; Label: Arran; Format: DVD
Margo, the Girl from Donegal: Queen of Country and Irish Music	Released: 16 April 2016; Label: Irish TV; Format: DVD
An Evening with Margo	Released: 5 June 2020; Label: Crashed; Format: DVD

== Extended plays ==
List of extended plays, showing selected chart positions
Title	Details	Peak chart position
Title	Details	IRE
Shamrock from Glenore	Released: February 1973; Label: ARA; Format: 7"	2
The Deepening Snow	Released: October 1973; Label: ARA; Format: 7"	11
Destination Donegal	Released: 1975; Label: IRL; Format: 7"	—
Tipperary Far Away	Released: 1986; Label: Smashed; Format: 7"	—
Two's Company (with Daniel O'Donnell)	Released: January 1988; Label: Ritz; Format: 7"	3

== Singles ==
List of singles, showing selected chart positions
Title	Year	Peak chart position	Album
Title	Year	IRE	Album
"Bonny Irish Boy" (with the Keynotes)	1968	18	From Margo with Love...
"Road by the River" (with the Keynotes)	1968	2	Non-album single
"Once a Day" (with the Keynotes)	1969	—	Non-album single
"Grádh Mo Chroí" (with the Country Folk)	1970	6	Non-album single
"I'll Forgive and I'll Try to Forget" (with the Country Folk)	1970	1	Non-album single
"Deep Sheephaven Bay" (with the Country Folk)	1971	—	From Margo with Love...
"Don't Read the Letter" (with the Country Folk)	1971	—	Non-album single
"The Girl from Donegal"	1974	6	The Girl from Donegal
"Yes! Mr. Peters" (with Larry Cunningham)	1976	15	Yes! Mr. Peters
"Irish Eyes"	1976	2	Non-album single
"West of the Old River Shannon"	1977	—	Non-album single
"Lonely Hearts Club"	1978	—	Greatest Hits, Vol. 2
"Good Evening Henry"	1979	19	Non-album single
"Thank You for the Roses"	1980	—	A Toast from an Irish Colleen
"Back Home to Donegal"	1981	—	A Toast from an Irish Colleen
"Two Little Orphans"	1981	—	A Toast from an Irish Colleen
"Coal Miner's Daughter"	1981	—	Non-album single
"Isle of Ireland"	1984	12	The Irish Songs I Love to Sing
"We Haven't Tried"	1985	—	Non-album single
"Goodbye Johnny Dear"	1985	—	The Irish Songs I Love to Sing
"The Violet and the Rose"	1987	—	Margo Now
"A New Tomorrow"	1989	26	A Trip Through Ireland
"God's Colouring Book" (with Dolly Parton)	1997	—	The Highway of My Life: Shade of the Family Tree
"My Dear Father I've Loved You"	2010	—	Stories in Song
"The Missing Mary Boyle"	2011	—	Non-album single
"Christmas Spirit" (with Joe McShane)	2011	—	Non-album single
"Walking Tall in Donegal"	2012	—	Non-album single
"Blue Are the Violets"	2013	—	Non-album single
"Learning to Say Goodbye"	2014	—	50 Songs 50 Years
"Sr. Consilio (You Are Our Guide)"	2014	—	Non-album single
"Pocketful of Dreams"	2014	—	The Promise & the Dream
"Memories Precious Memories" (with Dermot Moriarty)	2014	—	Non-album single
"Let's Make a Difference"	2015	—	The Promise & the Dream
"Fly Me West"	2016	—	Non-album single
"My Kind of Woman, My Kind of Man" (with Ciarán Rosney)	2016	—	Non-album single
"A Love That's Lasted Through the Years" (with Big Tom)	2017	—	Non-album single
"Have You Got Time?"	2019	—	Old & New
"A Million Reasons"	2019	—	Old & New
"Thanks for the Memories"	2020	—	Non-album single
"This House (A Home)"	2021	—	Non-album single
"The Two Go's" (with Hugo Duncan)	2022	—	Non-album single
"Memories Live On"	2022	—	Non-album single
"Christmas in Ireland"	2022	—	Non-album single
