= List of number-one singles of 1972 (Ireland) =

This is a list of singles which have reached number one on the Irish Singles Chart in 1972. The chart issue date changed from Saturday to Friday effective in late June.

Issue date	Song	Artist	References
1 January	"Slaney Valley"	Larry Cunningham	
8 January	"I'd Like To Teach The World To Sing (In Perfect Harmony)"	The New Seekers	
15 January	"I'd Like To Teach The World To Sing (In Perfect Harmony)"	The New Seekers	
22 January	"The Men Behind the Wire"	The Barleycorn	
29 January	"The Men Behind the Wire"	The Barleycorn	
5 February	"The Men Behind the Wire"	The Barleycorn	
12 February	"Telegram Sam"	T. Rex	
19 February	"Telegram Sam"	T. Rex	
26 February	"Telegram Sam"	T. Rex	
4 March	"Give Ireland Back to the Irish"	Paul McCartney	
11 March	"Without You"	Nilsson	
18 March	"Ceol an Ghrá"	Sandie Jones	
25 March	"Without You"	Nilsson	
1 April	"Three Leafed Shamrock"	John Kerr	
8 April	"Broken Marriage Vows"	Big Tom And The Mainliners	
15 April	"Broken Marriage Vows"	Big Tom And The Mainliners	
22 April	"Amazing Grace"	Royal Scots Dragoon Guards	
29 April	"Sunday Bloody Sunday"	Paddywagon	
6 May	"What Do I Do"	Sandie, Joe and Dixies	
13 May	"A Thing Called Love"	Johnny Cash	
20 May	"A Thing Called Love"	Johnny Cash	
27 May	"A Thing Called Love"	Johnny Cash	
3 June	"A Thing Called Love"	Johnny Cash	
10 June	"Metal Guru"	T. Rex	
16 June	"Vincent"	Don McLean	
22 June	"Vincent"	Don McLean	
29 June	"Ooh-Wakka-Doo-Wakka-Day"	Gilbert O'Sullivan	
6 July	"Ooh-Wakka-Doo-Wakka-Day"	Gilbert O'Sullivan	
13 July	"Ooh-Wakka-Doo-Wakka-Day"	Gilbert O'Sullivan	
20 July	"Ooh-Wakka-Doo-Wakka-Day"	Gilbert O'Sullivan	
20 July	"Sylvia's Mother"	Dr. Hook & The Medicine Show	
27 July	"Sylvia's Mother"	Dr. Hook & The Medicine Show	
3 August	"Sylvia's Mother"	Dr. Hook & The Medicine Show	
10 August	"Sylvia's Mother"	Dr. Hook & The Medicine Show	
17 August	"Sylvia's Mother"	Dr. Hook & The Medicine Show	
24 August	"Sylvia's Mother"	Dr. Hook & The Medicine Show	
31 August	"Sylvia's Mother"	Dr. Hook & The Medicine Show	
7 September	"The Gypsy"	Dermot Henry	
14 September	"The Gypsy"	Dermot Henry	
21 September	"Mama Weer All Crazee Now"	Slade	
28 September	"Mama Weer All Crazee Now"	Slade	
5 October	"Children of the Revolution"	T. Rex	
12 October	"Children of the Revolution"	T. Rex	
19 October	"How Can I Be Sure?"	David Cassidy	
26 October	"Clair"	Gilbert O'Sullivan	
2 November	"Mouldy Old Dough"	Lieutenant Pigeon	
9 November	"Clair"	Gilbert O'Sullivan	
16 November	"Clair"	Gilbert O'Sullivan	
23 November	"Clair"	Gilbert O'Sullivan	
30 November	"Clair"	Gilbert O'Sullivan	
7 December	"My Ding-A-Ling"	Chuck Berry	
14 December	"My Ding-A-Ling"	Chuck Berry	
21 December	"Whiskey in the Jar"	Thin Lizzy	
28 December	"Whiskey in the Jar"	Thin Lizzy	

== See also ==
- 1972 in music
- List of artists who reached number one in Ireland
