= Ray Korona =

American singer-songwriter

Ray Korona (1946 – October 16, 2014) was an American folk musician, particularly known for topical songs.

== Biography and repertoire ==
Ray Korona wrote folk and folk rock songs about working, the environment, peace and social justice issues along with songs on the more traditional themes of love and friendship. Previously an attorney, Korona left the profession to pursue a career in music. In addition to songwriting and performance Korona helped organise events, ran a home studio, volunteered at a collective-run cafe and supported the Peoples Music Network. A founding member of the Travelling Musician's Union, Local 1000 of the American Federation of Musicians. Korona's songs vary from the satirical and topical to ballads, chorus and story songs. Due to the subject matter of many of these songs, they are often referenced in studies of political and economic issues and used in support of various public causes by their advocates as discussed here.

A number of Korona's songs addressing such diverse subjects as homelessness, downsizing, gay rights and health care policies are included in the directory of some 3,000 songs identified for use in classrooms for teaching purposes maintained by the nonprofit corporation, M.U.S.I.C. In the United States, Teachers' Curriculum Institute has published the lyrics to Korona's "Globalization Blues" song in a classroom text which includes a disc with a recording of the song to promote academic discussions on the subject of globalization. This same song has likewise been published for classroom use in Germany, Austria and Switzerland. Another song, "Where Do We Go From Here?" sparked a New York Magazine cover story reporting on the impact of the housing crisis' on the New York City artist community.

Other songs by Korona have been utilized in advocating causes rather than in fostering learning. His health care rights song, "Send Me An Ambulance" was featured on National Public Radio and performed at major Jobs With Justice rallies for national health care reform. "We Will Have Dignity," a song against child labor, has been published around the world in many languages by the UN’s International Labour Organization to lend support to its work on this issue.

== The Ray Korona Band ==
Korona performed both solo and with a unique collective of musical organizers, The Ray Korona Band. The Band is a core group of musicians—Ivice (harmonies & dulcimers), Barry Kornhauser (bass, cello & mandola), Sharon Abreu (harmonies & fiddle), Ellen Davidson (harmonies & piano) & Gina Tlamsa (harmonies, flute, fiddle, mandolin & bouzouki) that works with a wide variety of players who bring racial, cultural and musical diversity to its work. Occasionally, guest musicians like John McCutcheon, Barry Mitterhoff and Perry Robinson sat in with the group and Korona often performed in concert with Pete Seeger. The names of those who have shared the stage with him suggest the orientation of his activist views and musical style, such as Patti Smith, Harry Belafonte, Tom Paxton, Anne Feeney, Richie Havens, Judy Gorman, Leon Rosselson, Suni Paz, Pat Humphries, Lucy Kaplansky, Gary US Bonds. Since many of Korona's songs are topical, he has also shared stages with noted speakers, such as Amy Goodman, Noam Chomsky, Greg Palast, and Jim Hightower. Korona was a regular at the Cornelia Street Cafe's Monday night songwriter workshop in the 1980s.

== Discography ==
- A Little Too Much Sunshine CD
- The Safe Thing To Do CD (includes a peace song co-written and performed with Pete Seeger)
- The People Are In Charge! CD
- The $5 Working People's Music Tape CD and tape (new songs on current labor issues)
- A Friend Like You CD
- It's Still the 60's CD
- Free Harbors CD
- Ray Korona Band Live at the Peoples' Voice Cafe DVD
- Send Me An Ambulance tape and video (cassette single in support of universal health care)
- Fight the Contract on America and the Stars Who are Selling It! tape (with Charlie King
- "Sanctions" CD single (about the sanctions in Iraq and how they devastated the old, the sick and the children of that country)

A number of Korona's songs are also featured on compilation albums, such as the new More Gardens CD, a two disc collection of songs supporting the need for community gardens in urban areas.
