= Peoples Music Network =

The People's Music Network for Songs of Freedom and Struggle, Inc. is a nonprofit organization that serves as a network of musicians, activists, songwriters, concert producers, sound engineers, and others, who use music and culture to promote progressive ideas and values. Founded in 1977 by Pete Seeger and Charlie King, the organization has two gatherings each year, one in upstate New York in early June, and one in late January in various cities (usually on the east coast of the US, but sometimes in other locations). The gatherings serve to provide networking opportunities for artists and activists, offering workshops on various topics (environmental songs, women's songs, labor songs, etc.), a Round Robin where each participant can perform one song for all others, and a loosely structured "Songs of the Spirit" session where inspiring a capella songs are sung.
