= John Kerr (singer) =

Irish ballad singer

John Kerr (c. 1925 – 25 April 2006) was an Irish ballad singer from Coolback, Fanad, County Donegal, Ireland.

The family name was actually Carr. His family ran a local shop in Coolback and his brother James was a shoe maker and cobbler.

His best-known recording is "'Three Leafed Shamrock" which reached number 1 in the singles charts of Ireland on 1 April 1972.

Kerr came into the business during the showband era as a lead singer with the Classic Showband. In the late 1960's, he decided to retire from the bandstand and the recording of Mulroy Bay was intended to be his swan song, but the song was such a success that it launched Kerr into a solo career. Kerr went on to record fourteen albums during his career, which continued right up to his 80th year.

Kerr ran a shop in Bridgetown, Kerrykeel until the turn of the century.

He started out as a shoe repairer and built a small drapery business that served both the tourist trade and local needs.

== See also ==
- Irish folk music
- Irish Singles Chart
- List of artists who reached number one in Ireland
