= Political views and activism of Rage Against the Machine =

Rage Against the Machine burning the American flag at Woodstock '99

The political views and activism of Rage Against the Machine (RATM) are central to the band's music and public image. Rage Against the Machine was an American rock band formed in Los Angeles in 1991. The band's line-up consisted of vocalist Zack de la Rocha, bassist and backing vocalist Tim Commerford, guitarist Tom Morello, and drummer Brad Wilk. Critics have noted Rage Against the Machine for its "fiercely political music, which brewed sloganeering left wing rants against corporate America, cultural imperialism, and government oppression into a Molotov cocktail of punk, hip-hop, and thrash."

Integral to their identity as a band, Rage Against the Machine often voiced strong criticism of the domestic and foreign policies of the US government. The band and its individual members participated in political protests and other activism throughout its existence, and the band saw its music primarily as a means of spreading ideas. De la Rocha explained that "I'm interested in spreading those ideas through art because music has the power to cross borders, to break military sieges, and to establish real dialogue."

== EZLN ==
The "black flag and a red star" of the Zapatista Army of National Liberation, referenced in the track "War Within a Breath" (1999)

The band were vocal supporters of the Zapatista Army of National Liberation (EZLN), especially De la Rocha, who has taken several trips to the Mexican state of Chiapas to aid their efforts. The flag of the EZLN serves as the primary recurring theme in the band's visual art. Tom Morello described the EZLN as "a guerrilla army that represents the poor indigenous communities in southern Mexico" and praised its leader, Subcomandante Marcos, in an interview. An interviewer was once told by De la Rocha, "Our purpose in sympathizing with the Zapatistas is to help spark [real] dialogue."

It is important for me, as a popular artist, to make clear to the governments of the United States and Mexico that despite the strategy of fear and intimidation towards foreigners, despite their weapons, despite their immigration laws and military reserves, they will never be able to isolate the Zapatista communities from the people in the United States... Through concerts, videos, interviews, broadcasting of information at concerts, and our songs' lyrics, we have placed within reach of young people, our audience, and the experiences of the Zapatistas; we act as facilitators of the ways in which they can participate and put them in contact with the organisation and the Zapatista support committees in the United States.

The EZLN and De la Rocha's experiences with them inspired the songs "People of the Sun", "Wind Below," and "Without a Face" from Evil Empire, and "War Within a Breath" from The Battle Of Los Angeles.

The EZLN flag was used as a stage backdrop at all of the band's shows from their reunion in April 2007 to their final show in August 2022.

Zack de la Rocha asked their record label, Epic Records, for $30,000 to donate to the EZLN. It is not known if they complied.

== 1991–2000: First tenure ==
=== Radio Free L.A. ===
Radio Free Los Angeles was a radio show held by the band on January 20, 1997, the night of Bill Clinton's second inauguration as President. The show comprised segments and interviews featuring Michael Moore, teen rights activist Emily Hodgson, Leonard Peltier, Chuck D, Mumia Abu-Jamal, UNITE, Noam Chomsky, Amy Ray of the Indigo Girls, and Subcomandante Marcos of the Zapatistas. These were intercut with musical performances by Morello, De la Rocha, Flea and Stephen Perkins playing different versions of Rage songs, as well as Beck and Cypress Hill playing their own songs. The band organized and played the show in response to the re-election of Clinton:

That election had resulted in one of the lowest voter turnouts in the history of the country, as more and more Americans came to realize that their government was not in their hands, but in the hands of big business. Radio Free L.A. provided a musical and political gathering point for the majority of Americans—and young people especially—who rightly felt left out of the 'democratic process.'

The two-hour show was syndicated by over 50 commercial U.S. radio stations and streamed live from the band's website. Transcripts of the interviews are freely available online.

=== "Sleep Now in the Fire" video shoot ===
On January 26, 2000, the band filmed of the music video for "Sleep Now in the Fire" near the New York Stock Exchange. Directed by Michael Moore, the video was shot on the steps of Federal Hall National Memorial, across from the NYSE in downtown Manhattan. The band invited fans to join them in the shoot and approximately 300 showed up. After the breakdown of the shoot, the band members, Moore and a camera crew attempted to enter the NYSE, but were denied entrance by security personnel, who suggested they head to the visitor center instead. De la Rocha was shoved away from the entrance after briefly entering through a side door. After the incident, Morello claimed that the protest "stopped trading at the stock exchange for the last two hours of the day," and Moore wrote that they were able to "essentially shut down American capitalism" for several minutes. However, Mark Shone of Spin magazine wrote that the protest had no effect on stock trading inside the building, and the only legal ramification was that Moore was issued a ticket for filming without a permit. Regarding Moore's version of the events, Shone wrote that "many involved in the production tell a different story and question whether Moore manipulated the shoot to produce maximum conflict."

=== 2000 Democratic National Convention ===
RATM played a free concert at the 2000 Democratic National Convention in protest of the two-party system. The band had been considering playing a protest concert there since April that year. Although they were at first required by the City of Los Angeles to perform in a small venue at a considerable distance, early in August a United States district court judge ruled that the city's request was too restrictive and the City subsequently allowed the protests and concert to be held at a site across from the DNC. In response, the Los Angeles Police Department increased security measures, including a 12 ft fence and patrolling by a minimum of 2,000 officers wearing riot gear, as well as additional horses, motorcycles, squad cars and police helicopters. A police spokesperson said they were "gravely concerned because of security reasons".

During the concert, De la Rocha said to the crowd, "brothers and sisters, our democracy has been hijacked", and later also shouted "we have a right to oppose these motherfuckers!" After the performance, a small group of attendees congregated at the point in the protest area closest to the DNC, facing the police officers, throwing rocks, and possibly engaging in more violent activity, such as throwing glass, concrete and water bottles filled with "noxious agents", spraying ammonia on police and slingshotting rocks and steel balls. The police soon declared the gathering an unlawful assembly, turned off the electrical supply, interrupting performing band Ozomatli, and informed the protestors that they had 15 minutes to disperse on pain of arrest. Some of the protestors remained, including two young men who climbed the fence and waved black flags, and were subsequently sprayed in the face with pepper spray. Police then forcibly dispersed the crowd, using tear gas, pepper spray and rubber bullets. At least six people were arrested in the incident.

The police faced severe and broad criticism for their reaction, with an American Civil Liberties Union spokesperson saying that it was "nothing less than an orchestrated police riot". Several primary witnesses reported unnecessarily violent actions and police abuses, including firing on reporters and people obeying police commands. Police responded that their response was "outstanding" and "clearly disciplined". De la Rocha said of the incident, "I don't care what fucking television stations said, [that] the violence was caused by the people at the concert; those motherfuckers unloaded on this crowd. And I think it's ridiculous considering, you know, none of us had rubber bullets, none of us had M16s, none of us had billy clubs, none of us had face shields."

Footage of the protest and ensuing violence, along with an MTV News report on the incident, was included in the Live at the Grand Olympic Auditorium DVD.

== 2007–2011: Second tenure ==
=== Iraq War, Fox News, and the "assassination" comments controversy ===
At the Coachella 2007 performance, De la Rocha made an impassioned speech during "Wake Up", citing a statement by Noam Chomsky regarding the Nuremberg Trials and subsequent actions by US presidents, as follows:

A good friend of ours once said that if the same laws were applied to U.S. presidents as were applied to the Nazis after World War II [...] every single one of them, every last rich white one of them from Truman on, would have been hung to death and shot—and this current administration is no exception. They should be hung, and tried, and shot. As any war criminal should be.

A clip of De la Rocha's speech found its way to the Fox News program Hannity & Colmes. An on-screen headline read, "Rock group Rage Against the Machine says Bush admin should be shot". Ann Coulter, a right-wing commentator and a guest on the show, stated, "They're losers, their fans are losers, and there's a lot of violence coming from the left wing."

On July 28 and 29, Rage co-headlined the hip hop festival Rock the Bells. On July 28, they made a speech during their performance of "Wake Up" just as they had done at Coachella. During this, De La Rocha made another statement, defending the band from Fox News who he claimed had misquoted him:

A couple of months ago, those fascist motherfuckers at the Fox News Network attempted to pin this band into a corner by suggesting that we said that the president should be assassinated. Nah, what we said was that he should be brought to trial as a war criminal and hung and shot. THAT'S what we said. And we don't back away from the position because the real assassinator is Bush, and Cheney and the whole administration for the lives they have destroyed here and in Iraq. They're the ones. And what they refused to air which was far more provocative in my mind and in the minds of my bandmates is this: that this system has become so brutal and vicious and cruel that it needs to start wars and profit from the destruction around the world in order to survive as a world power. THAT's what we said. And we refuse not to stand up, we refuse to back down from that position...

On August 24, RATM played Alpine Valley in Wisconsin. They made another speech during "Wake Up".

A couple of months back, we played this show at Coachella Pavilion. It was our first show back. I said a few things from the stage, and the next day Fox News ran this whole piece about us saying that the Presidents should be assassinated. But those fascists always get it wrong when they just want to pin a band in the corner for standing up. What we said was that the whole Bush Administration should be put on trial for war crimes and then hung and then shot, that's what we said.

But besides that it made me think about something. It made me think about what the fuck they are so afraid of. It made me think about what scares them. Is it really four musicians from Los Angeles who've got a point of view? Is it really just this music and these rhythms and these words? Is that what they're scared of? I thought I'd think about it and you know what? My conclusion is this: nah, they ain't scared of us, they're scared of you! They're scared of you! They're scared that you might come election time and throw Bush and Cheney and all them fascists out of power! That's what they're scared of!

And let me say this, that the Democrats are scared of you too! Because they know that you see through their bullshit too. Because when Bush was wiretapping, spying on citizens, torturing innocent people – they were supposed to be the people to defend us from them, and they didn't do shit! So the Democrats are scared of you too, why? Because they know they're coming to power and they're taking it all for granted, but they're scared because they know that if they don't fucking start pulling troops out of Iraq that you're going to go and burn down every office of every Senator that doesn't do the job.

Well I will say this, that the world is watching us now. The whole world is watching us. The brothers and sisters in South America who are dealing with this imperialist violence have got their eyes on us. Our brothers and sisters in Iraq got their eyes on us. Because we are the ones that are ... going to put an end to this nonsense. So Wake Up. Come on, Wake Up! Wake Up!

Subsequently, De la Rocha added Tony Blair, the UK Prime Minister who supported George Bush's 2003 invasion of Iraq, to the list of those who ought to be tried and hanged at the Reading Festival on August 22, 2008. The Reading and Leeds Festivals organizer announced after the 2008 festival that De la Rocha had requested Friday and Saturday slots specifically so he could be back in the US for the Democratic and Republican conventions taking place in the week of the 25th.

=== 2008 Republican National Convention ===
On September 2, 2008, during the Republican National Convention, Rage Against the Machine was scheduled to play a free show in protest of what De la Rocha called the power abusing party in St. Paul, Minnesota on the State Capital lawn for Ripple Effect. Morello was asked by SuicideGirls to report what happened there. He said:

[We] showed up at exactly the time we were scheduled to perform, and as soon as we got out of our vehicle we were immediately surrounded by riot police who told us if we approached the stage we'd be arrested for playing music. They said that we were not on a permit for the day's show. We produced the permit and showed them that none of the artists that had already been playing for the previous four hours, including Anti-Flag and Michael Franti, none of the artists were listed on the permits. They just tried to use that as an excuse to stop us from playing. We were there right on time to play and they physically barred us from getting onto the stage because they were afraid of the music we were going to play. Imagine if in Beijing during the Olympics a Chinese band whose songs were critical of the government was told they'd be arrested if they attempted to sing those songs in a public forum — there would have been an international human rights outcry. But that's exactly what happened in Minnesota. But this is a band that has made a living singing a song that goes 'Fuck you, I won't do what you tell me,' so we weren't about to go back to the hotel with our tails between our legs. So we out-flanked the police line and went into the middle of the crowd, and played a couple of songs passing a bull horn back and forth, and it seemed to go over pretty well.

On September 3, 2008, the band played a concert in Minneapolis at the Target Center, on the third day of the Republican National Convention. The band surprised the crowd when they silently stood on stage while wearing orange Guantanamo Bay-like prisoner suits with black hoods over their heads. They opened up with "Bombtrack". An impromptu demonstration spilled out into the streets afterwards. 102 people were arrested as riot police ended the gathering.

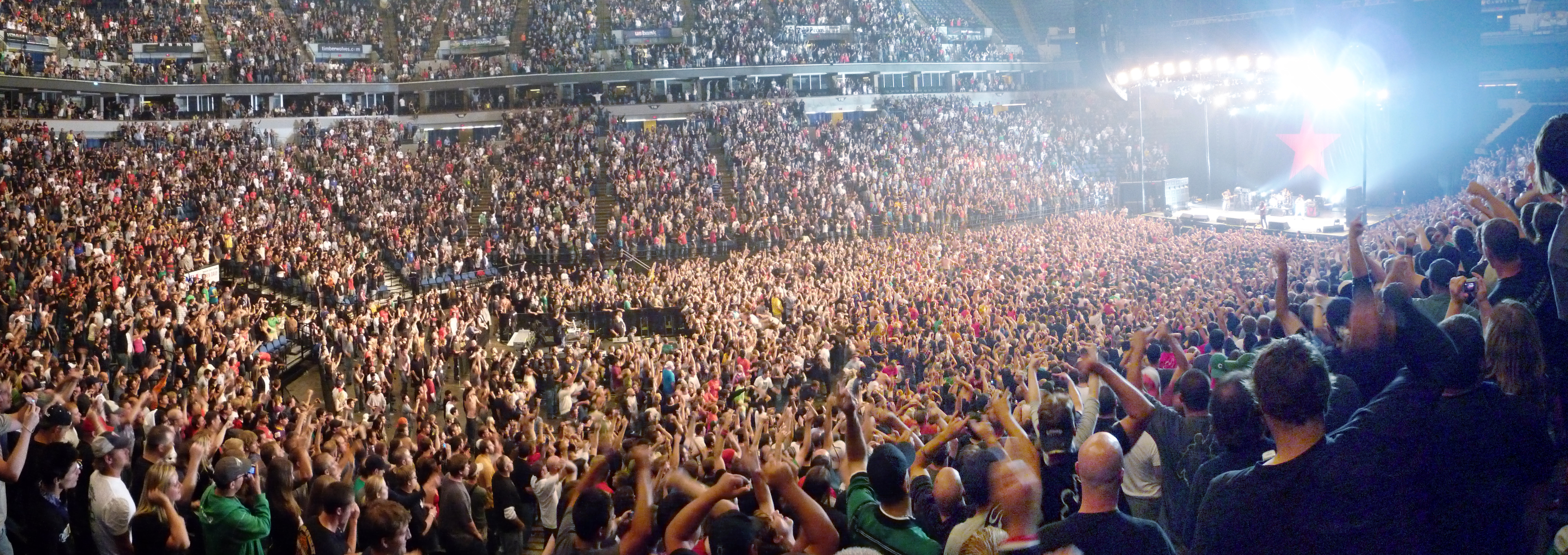
Rage Against the Machine performing at the Target Center during the 2008 Republican National Convention.

=== Rage Against Torture ===
In October 2009, Rage Against the Machine, along with members of Nine Inch Nails, Pearl Jam, R.E.M. and the Roots joined a campaign to close Guantanamo Prison, calling also for the declassification of military records regarding the use of music in torture. Based on reports that songs by Rage and Nine Inch Nails were used in torture at the controversial facility, the group is filing for further declassification under the Freedom of Information Act.

Guantanamo is known around the world as one of the places where human beings have been tortured – from water boarding, to stripping, hooding and forcing detainees into humiliating sexual acts – playing music for 72 hours in a row at volumes just below that to shatter the eardrums. Guantanamo may be Dick Cheney's idea of America, but it's not mine. The fact that music I helped create was used in crimes against humanity sickens me – we need to end torture and close Guantanamo now.

=== 2010 activism and censorship in Brazil ===
On October 9, 2010, RATM made its first gig in Brazil and played at the music festival SWU Music & Arts in Itu. Despite sound problems and some flaws in the organization of the event, the first show on Brazilian soil had a major impact and received good reviews. Morello wore the cap of the Landless Workers' Movement (known in Brazil simply as MST) during the performance of the song "Wake Up" and the band dedicated "People of the Sun" to that social movement. According to the Brazilian Independent Media Center and other alternative media news websites, the TV channel Multishow, which had announced that would broadcast the full concert, censored the broadcast cutting it short after only 35 minutes of its onset, at the exact moment when Morello put on a cap of the MST. Instead of RATM's performance, the channel aired the erotic television show "Sexytime" that was expected to air 1 hour 25 minutes later.

The channel claimed that the broadcast was interrupted due to technical problems after the public invaded the restricted area of the shooting crew; it has been difficult to confirm which version is true. However, it is undisputed that the praise singer De la Rocha made of the Brazilian Landless Workers' Movement was omitted from the Multishow Channel broadcast, and censorship has occurred at least in this respect. On October 10 Morello stated on his Twitter account: "I understand the network cut away when I put on the PST hat. That means we're winning." And then corrected: "Of course that's MST, not PST. PST stands for Post São Paulo Triatholon."

== Other activism ==
The band advocated for the release of convicted murderer, former Black Panther and life imprisonment inmate Mumia Abu-Jamal, for whom they wrote and recorded the track "Voice of the Voiceless" for their 1999 album The Battle of Los Angeles. The band performed at a benefit concert, and all the proceeds were donated to the International Concerned Family and Friends of Mumia Abu-Jamal, and De la Rocha spoke before the United Nations Commission on Human Rights in support of Abu-Jamal. The band also raised funds and awareness for political activist and convicted double-murderer Leonard Peltier, and documented his case in the video for "Freedom".

At a 1993 Lollapalooza appearance in Philadelphia, the band stood onstage naked for 15 minutes with duct tape on their mouths and the letters PMRC painted on their chests in protest against censorship by the Parents Music Resource Center. Refusing to play, they stood in silence with the sound emitted being only audio feedback from Morello and Commerford's amplifiers. The band later played a free show for disappointed fans. Morello was arrested for civil disobedience in October 1997 during a union protest by garment workers and their supporters against the use of sweatshop labor by Guess? Billboards subsequently appeared in Las Vegas and New York featuring a photograph of the band with the caption "Rage Against Sweatshops: We Don't Wear Guess – A Message from Rage Against the Machine and UNITE (Union of Needletrades Industrial and Textile Employees). Injustice. Don't buy it."

Some other controversial stands taken include that of the music video for the song "Bombtrack", in which RATM expresses support for the Peruvian revolutionary organization Shining Path and their incarcerated leader Abimael Guzmán, sentenced for the 1983 Lucanamarca massacre and the Tarata bombing. Over its career, the band played benefit concerts for organizations such as Rock for Choice, the Anti-Nazi League, the United Farm Workers, children's care organization Para Los Niños and UNITE. 1994 saw the band organizing Latinpalooza, a joint benefit concert for the Leonard Peltier Defense Fund, and Para Los Niños. The band also raised funds for Fairness and Accuracy in Reporting, the National Commission for Democracy in Mexico, Women Alive, and played at the Tibetan Freedom Concert on more than one occasion. Album liner notes contained promotional material for AK Press, Amnesty International, the committee to Support the Revolution in Peru, the Hollywood Sunset Free Clinic, Indymedia, Mass Mic, Parents for Rock and Rap, the Popular Resource Center, RE: GENERATION, Refuse and Resist, Revolution Books, the Rock & Rap Confidential, and Voices in the Wilderness. When the band headlined Reading Festival on August 22, 2008, Getafe Electric Festival on May 30, 2008, and the Pinkpop Festival on June 1, 2008, they came on stage to the sound of a prison klaxon, dressed in orange prison jumpsuits with black sacks over their heads, presumably in reference to the conditions of prisoners at Guantanamo Bay. They remained silent onstage for around a minute until being led to their instruments and performing their opening song, "Bombtrack", still in the prison outfits.

In June 2010 De la Rocha stepped up his campaign to compel the state of Arizona to repeal its controversial immigration law by encouraging artists to boycott performing in the state. In addition, he has said they "are going to be organizing a series of concerts that are respectful of the nature of the boycott in its attempts to isolate the Arizona government but not isolate the people." Rage Against the Machine performed in Los Angeles for the first time in 10 years on July 23, 2010, to protest the Arizona immigration law.

Paul Ryan, the Republican nominee for Vice President in the 2012 election has said that his favorite musicians are Ludwig van Beethoven, Rage Against the Machine and Led Zeppelin. Morello wrote an op-ed in Rolling Stone stating that "Paul Ryan's love for Rage Against the Machine is amusing, because he is the embodiment of the machine that our music has been raging against for two decades" and "You see, the super rich must rationalize having more than they could ever spend while millions of children in the U.S. go to bed hungry every night".

During the band's Public Service Announcement Tour in 2022, the band announced they would donate $475,000 in ticket sale revenue to reproductive rights organizations in Wisconsin and Illinois, and screened statements saying "abort the Supreme Court" at their concerts, following the overturning of Roe v. Wade that restricted access to abortion in the United States.

In July 2022, the band called out Canada's treatment of its indigenous people during a concert in Ottawa, Ontario.

== See also ==
- Music and politics
