= If Those Lips Could Only Speak =

Single by Dermot Henry and the Virginians
- B-side: "Joey and the Kid"
- Released: 1970
- Genre: showband
- Length: 3:16
- Label: Ruby
- Songwriters: Charles Ridgewell and Will Godwin
- Producer: Jerry Hughes

Dermot Henry and the Virginians singles chronology
"If Those Lips Could Only Speak" (1970)	"My Lovely Irish Rose" (1970)

"If Those Lips Could Only Speak" is a song written by Charles Ridgewell and Will Godwin. It was performed in 1970 by Irish showband singer Dermot Henry and his band, the Virginians.

== Song history ==
"If Those Lips Could Only Speak" was released in late 1970, reaching number one in the Irish Singles Chart in December 1970 and January 1971. It also sold well in Australia.
