= Three Leafed Shamrock =

Single by John Kerr
- B-side: "There's A Bridle Hanging On The Wall"
- Released: 1970
- Recorded: 1970
- Genre: Sentimental ballad, Irish traditional
- Length: 4:27
- Label: Pye
- Songwriter: Traditional

John Kerr singles chronology
"At Home In Donegal" (1970)	"Three Leafed Shamrock" (1970)	"The Dark Island" (1974)

"Three Leafed Shamrock," also called "Three Leaf Shamrock," is a 1970 Irish ballad performed by Irish singer John Kerr, with Hugh McClean and P. J. Wilhare.

== Lyrics ==
The song describes a girl giving a three-leafed shamrock, a symbol of Ireland, to her lover, as he moves abroad on St Patrick's Day.

== Song history ==
"Three Leafed Shamrock," a traditional song, was released by John Kerr in 1970 and reached number 1 in the Irish singles chart for the week of 1 April 1972. It was later covered by Daniel O'Donnell, Dermot Hegarty and by Margo.
