= Charlie King (folk singer) =

American singer-songwriter

- Born: 1947 (age 77–78); Brockton, Massachusetts, U.S.
- Genres: Folk
- Occupation(s): Musician, activist
- Website: http://www.charlieking.org

Charlie King (born 1947) is an American folk singer-songwriter and political activist.

== Biography ==
King was born and raised in Brockton, Massachusetts and cites the folk music revival of the 1960s, the Civil Rights Movement and the Vietnam War era as his musical influences.

His songs have been recorded and sung by other performers such as Pete Seeger, Holly Near, Ronnie Gilbert, John McCutcheon, Arlo Guthrie, Peggy Seeger, Chad Mitchell and Judy Small. Honors include an "Indie" award for one of the top three folk recordings of 1984.

In May 1998 the War Resisters League gave their Peacemaker Award to Charlie and to Odetta. Pete Seeger nominated Charlie for the Sacco-Vanzetti Social Justice Award, which he received in November 1999.

Charlie King has released a dozen solo albums since 1976. He has also released three albums with the touring ensemble Bright Morning Star, and numerous compilation albums with other artists.

Folk legend Peggy Seeger said, "If we had more Charlie Kings in the world I'd be less worried," to which Tom Paxton added, "Luckily, we have him!"

King regularly performs at Camp Kinderland in Tolland, Massachusetts.
