= The Gypsy (Dermot Henry song) =

Single by Dermot Henry
- B-side: "Éamonn an Chnoic"
- Released: July 1972
- Recorded: 1972
- Genre: Country and Irish, showband
- Length: 2:21
- Label: Columbia
- Songwriter: Traditional
- Producer: Dónal Lunny

Dermot Henry singles chronology
"Heaven Says Hello" (1971)	"The Gypsy" (1972)	"Where The Sunset Turns The Ocean Blue To Gold" (1972)

"The Gypsy" is a 1972 showband song performed by Irish singer Dermot Henry.

== Song history ==
It was released by Dermot Henry in July 1972 and reached number 1 in the Irish singles chart for two weeks in September 1972.
