= Johann Schelle =

German Baroque composer (1648–1701)

Johann Schelle (6 September 1648 – 10 March 1701) was a German Baroque composer.

== Biography ==
Schnelle was born on 6 September 1648 in Geising, Saxony. From 1655 to 1657 he was a choirboy in Dresden and pupil of Heinrich Schütz. From 1657 to 1664 on Schütz's recommendation he was a singer in Wolfenbüttel. He was the cantor of the Thomanerchor, Leipzig, from 1677 to 1701. In 1689/90 he collaborated on a cycle of chorale cantatas with Leipzig theologian Benedict Carpzov.

=== Leipzig ===
When his former teacher Sebastian Knüpfer died, Schelle succeeded him as Kantor of the Thomaskirche in Leipzig, a post later held by J.S. Bach. He obtained the post on 31 January 1677, and held it until his death. His appointment was made against the wishes of the city mayor, who remained antagonistic to him and the changes he introduced in the musical content of services. The matter came to a head when Schelle replaced the Latin compositions written by Italian masters with music to German texts, especially cantatas. When the city council finally took Schelle's side on the problem Schelle started the practice of introducing into the Protestant liturgy in Leipzig not only the Gospel cantata to German texts but later the chorale cantata, too. This remains one of his most important achievements.

Schnelle died on 10 March 1701 in Leipzig, at the age of 52.

== Works, editions and recordings ==
Over 200 compositions by Schelle are listed, but only 47 survive. During his life the only work printed was Christus ist des Gesetzes Ende, Leipzig 1684.

Recordings

- Schelle: Actus Musicus auf Wey-Nachten Gundula Anders (soprano), Andreas Scholl (alto), Wilfried Jochens (tenor), Harry van der Kamp (bass). Musica Fiata, Roland Wilson. DHM.
- Sacred Music by Johann Schelle, King's Consort. Hyperion Records
- "Actus Musicus auf Wey-Nachten" Christmas cantatas: Monika Mauch, Myriam Arbouz (soprano), Marian Dijkhuizen (alto), Georg Poplutz, Jakob Pilgram (tenor), Raimonds Spogis (baritone), Concerto Palatino, Kölner Akademie, Michael Alexander Willens, CPO
- Bach and before. Music by Schein, Schelle, Kuhnau, with Bach's Cantata BWV 75. The Bach Players (dir. Nicolette Moonen). Hyphen Press Music 012.
