= Cornett =

Early wind instrument with a cup mouthpiece

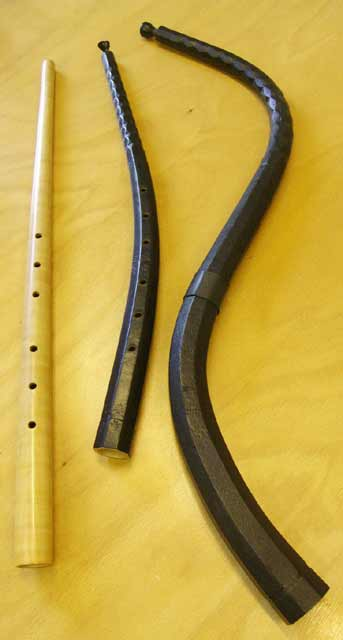
- Three different cornetts: mute cornett, curved cornett and tenor cornett.

Brass instrument
- Classification: Brass instrument Horn
- Hornbostel–Sachs classification: 423.212 (Lip-reed aerophone with tone holes or keys and irregular/moderately conical bore)
- Developed: Since antiquity; from instruments made from animal bone or horn with finger holes, such as the coradoiz

Playing range
- The sounding range of the treble cornett

Related instruments
- Natural trumpet; Oboe; Rozhok; Sackbut; Serpent

Musicians
- Bruce Dickey; Matthew Jennejonn; Arno Paduch; Jamie Savan; Edward Tarr; Jean Tubéry; Jeremy West; Roland Wilson

Builders
- 3D Music Instruments; Fritz Heller; Matthew Jennejohn; Christopher Monk Instruments; Grzegorz Tomaszewicz; Siam van der Veen; Sam Goble

The cornett (Italian: cornetto, German: Zink) is a lip-reed wind instrument that dates from the Medieval, Renaissance and Baroque periods, popular from 1500 to 1650. Although smaller and larger sizes were made in both straight and curved forms, surviving cornetts are mostly curved, built in the treble size from 51 to 63 cm (20 to 25 in) in length, usually described as in G. The note sounded with all finger-holes covered is A_{3}, which can be lowered a further whole tone to G by slackening the embouchure. The name cornett comes from the Italian cornetto, meaning "small horn".

It was used in performances by professional musicians for both state and liturgical music, especially accompanying choral music. It also featured in popular music in alta capella or loud wind ensembles. British organologist Anthony Baines wrote that the cornett "was praised in the very terms that were to be bestowed upon the oboe [...]: it could be sounded as loud as a trumpet and as soft as a recorder, and its tone approached that of the human voice more nearly than that of any other instrument." It was popular in Germany, where trumpet-playing was restricted to professional trumpet guild members. As well, the mute cornett variant was a quiet instrument, playing "gentle, soft and sweet."

The cornett is not to be confused with the modern cornet, a valved brass instrument with a separate origin and development. The English spelling cornet, which had applied to the cornett since about 1400, was in around 1836 transferred to the cornet à pistons, the predecessor of the modern cornet. Subsequently, cornett became the modern English spelling of the older instrument.

== Construction ==
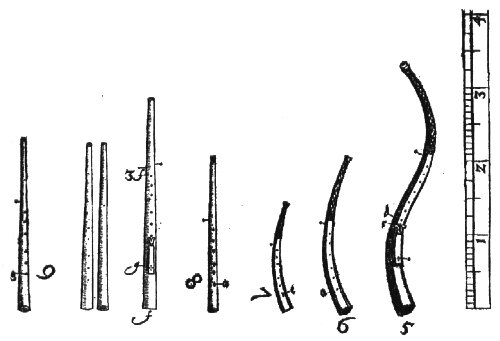
Cornetts in Syntagma Musicum, 1619. Left to right: alto straight cornet with mouthpiece (lowest note g), alto mute cornett (front and back), tenor mute cornett (lowest note g, key on 7th hole for f), treble straight cornett with mouthpiece (lowest note a), cornettino (lowest note e), treble cornett (lowest note a), tenor cornett (lowest note c).

Pipes as short as the cornett are able to play only four or five notes of the harmonic series when sounded with all finger-holes closed; these harmonics are used as part of the standard fingering within the cornett's designated range. Other short trumpets, including King Tut's Trumpet, are capable of playing only two notes without a modern mouthpiece.

The instrument has features of both the trumpet and a woodwind instrument. Like the trumpet, the cornett has a small cup-shaped mouthpiece, where the instrument is sounded with the player's lips. Like many woodwind instruments, it has fingered tone holes (and rarely, keys) to determine the pitch by shortening the vibrating air column, although pitch can also be adjusted by varying the tension of the player's embochure.

The cornett has six finger holes and, like the recorder, a single thumb hole on the opposite side. Together these allow the instrument to play a diatonic scale. A small number of cornetts were built with seven holes, and French instruments often lacked a thumbhole. By using "cross fingering" and by varying the embouchure tension, the instrument can play a chromatic scale. A player in 1738 who mastered the cross-fingering and lip tension was documented to have reached 27 notes and half notes. In comparison, Praetorius gave cornetts credit for achieving 15 notes, before players used techniques to expand the range.

The cornett has a conical bore, narrow at the mouthpiece and widening towards the bell. The ordinary curved treble cornett is made by splitting a length of wood, usually walnut, boxwood or other tonewoods like plum, cherry or pear. The bore is carved out and the two halves then glued back together, and the outside planed to an octagonal cross section. The whole is then further bound tightly in thin black leather or parchment. A small number of surviving instruments were made from one straight piece, bored on a lathe, and then bent into a curve with steam. The finger holes and thumb hole are then bored in the instrument, and are slightly undercut.

The socket for the mouthpiece at the narrow end is sometimes reinforced with a brass collar, and sometimes ornamental silver or brass ferrules are added to reinforce each end of the instrument, especially in Austrian- or German-made cornetts. The separate cup mouthpiece is usually made of horn, ivory, or bone, with a thin rim and thread-wrapped shank, which is used to tune the instrument. Because it usually lacks a (seventh) little finger hole, its lowest note is A_{3} below middle C, though G_{3} is readily obtained by adjusting the embouchure.

Mute cornetts were usually made of boxwood. The top of the instrument is narrow; the bore is about 4 millimetres (0.16 in) wide at the top of the instrument, with a cone-shaped mouthpiece carved into the top 13 millimetres (0.51 in) across and 9 millimetres (0.35 in) deep.

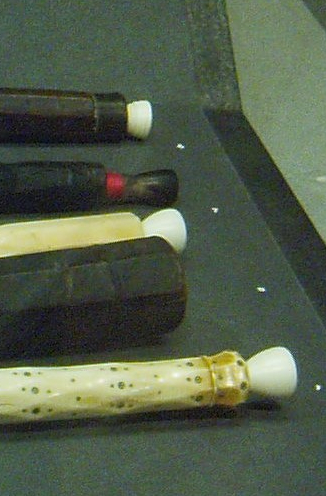
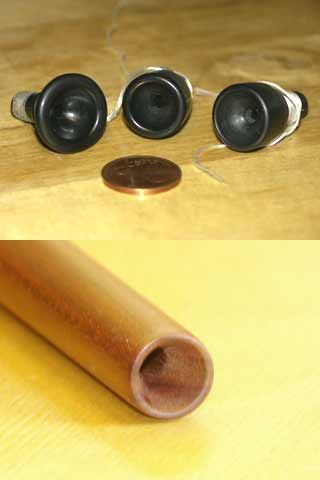
Cornett mouthpieces (left); mouthpiece size compared to a 1 cent coin (right, top); mute cornetts have the mouthpiece carved into the body (right, bottom)

== Cornett family ==
Cornetts were built in two styles, curved and straight.

Most cornetts are shaped with gradual curve, greater than 90°, a single curve like a comma, or an S-curve. The instrument has a conical bore, and the outside shaped to have an octagonal cross-section. Curved cornets were traditionally black, the wood covered in thin black leather. The cornett was, like many Renaissance and Baroque instruments, made in a family of sizes. Four extant sizes are the soprano (cornettino), the treble or curved cornett, the alto, the tenor or lizard and the rare bass cornett, which was supplanted by the serpent in the 17th century.

The lowest note of each type of cornett

=== Descant ===
The cornettino is the descant, or sometimes "soprano" member of the cornett family. In Syntagma Musicum, it was presented as being about 45 centimetres (18 in) long and had a range from E_{4} to E_{6} in the 16th and 17th centuries. In the 18th century that changed to D_{4} to D_{6}.

=== Treble ===
The 1911 Encyclopædia Britannica defined this instrument using its French name dessus (lit. 'top'), and gave its fingered range as A_{3} to A_{5}, the lowest being one note higher than that of the alto. To play notes below A_{3}, players can slacken their embouchure. Sibyl Marcuse did not name the normal cornett, but gave the treble's range. David Jarratt-Knock counted surviving instruments in museums to arrive at the treble cornett being the most commonly found cornett. From the 1619 scaled drawings in Syntagma Musicum, a variant of the treble is called the Alto. the instrument was about 2 feet (0.61 m) long. It was built to start playing a tone lower than the treble and has a fingered range from G_{3} to G_{5}. With good technique the lowest note is F_{3}. The 1911 Encyclopædia Britannica called this the haute-contre or alto cornet. Baines said that the use of this variant for an alto part was "widely speculated."

=== Tenor ===
The tenor cornett (Italian: cornone, French: basse de cornetà bouquin, German: Basszink) was the tenor instrument in the cornett family. About 3.5 feet (1.1 m) long from the Syntagma Musicum drawing, it was "proportionally wider" (bottom compared to top) than the treble and alto were, and that changed the tenor's sound quality to be more bugle-like.

Although the French and German names imply it was bass instrument, it is placed as a tenor instrument by organologists Sibyl Marcuse and Anthony Baines, who both point out that two examples of a "real bass" instrument exist.

The cornone was pitched about a fifth below the alto cornett, with a playing range of C_{3} to D_{5}. Even though tenor and bass instruments were created for the family, these came later in the instrument's development, perhaps as long as 50 years after the instrument became mainstream. The instrument was paired with other instruments to play the lower ranges, especially trombones.

=== Bass ===
There are very few surviving examples of instruments larger than the tenor cornett. One is called hautecontre de cornet à bouquin. The other should be called contrebass de cornet à bouquin according to Marcuse and Baines, and there are only two examples of it, one in the Paris Conservatoire museum and the other in Hamburg. These were tuned "a pitch or so below the type instrument" or an octave below the cornettino. The Paris instrument is described as having "an octagonal exterior and 4 extension keys." The Hamburg example has 2 extension keys.

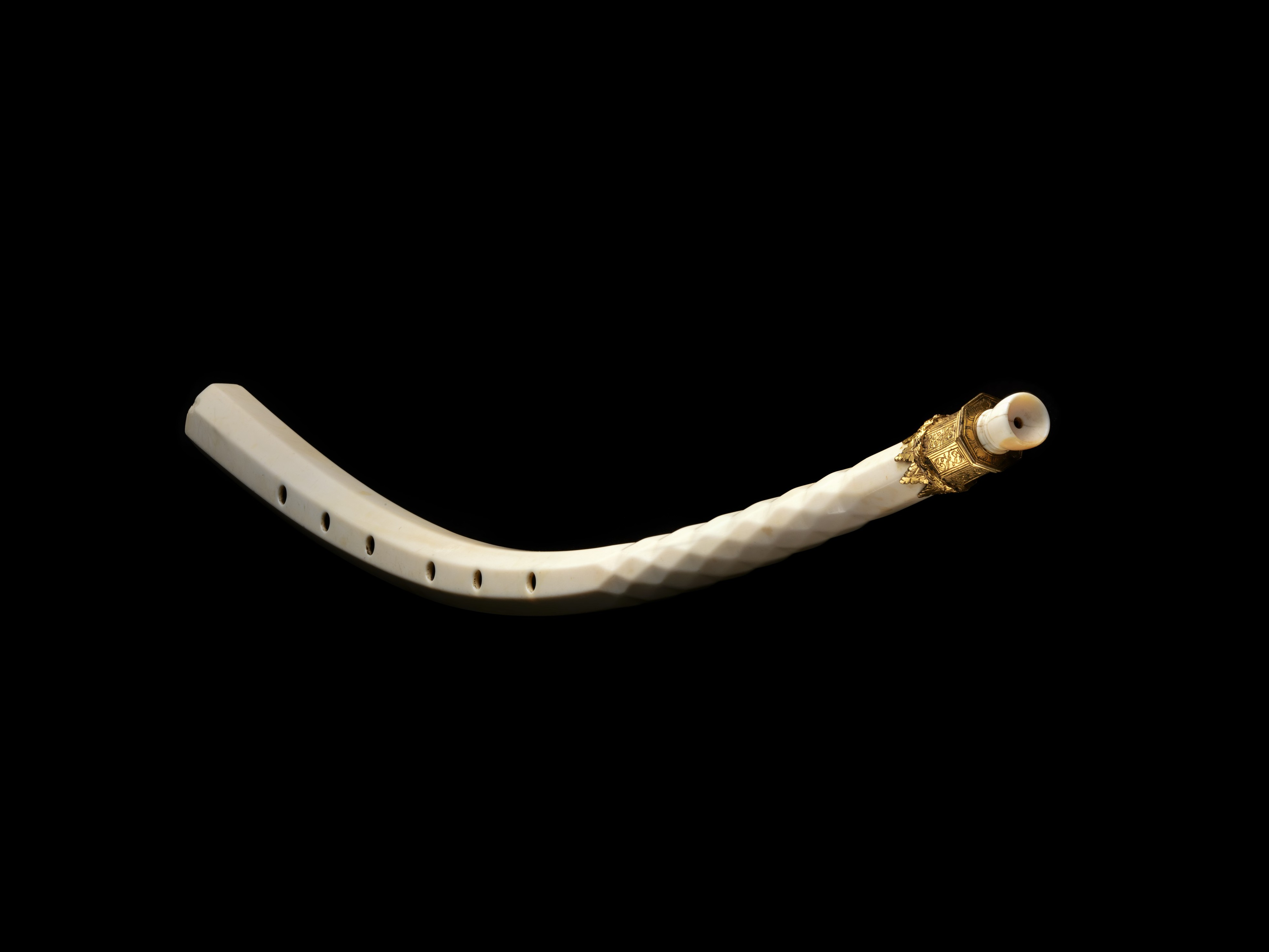
Ivory cornetto in A, at the Metropolitan Museum of Art

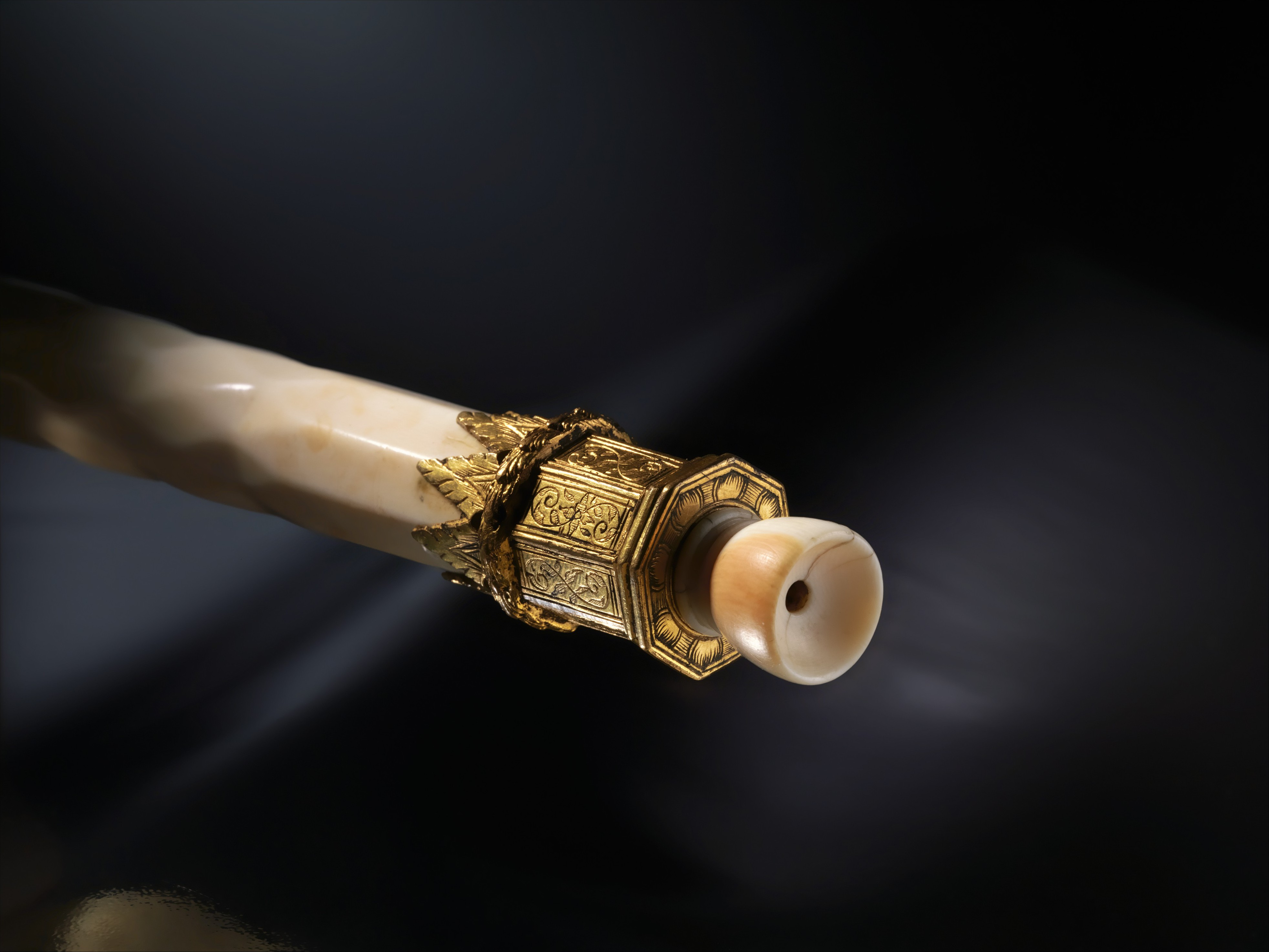
Highly decorated cornett and mouthpiece, cornetto in A, mouthpiece at the Metropolitan Museum of Art

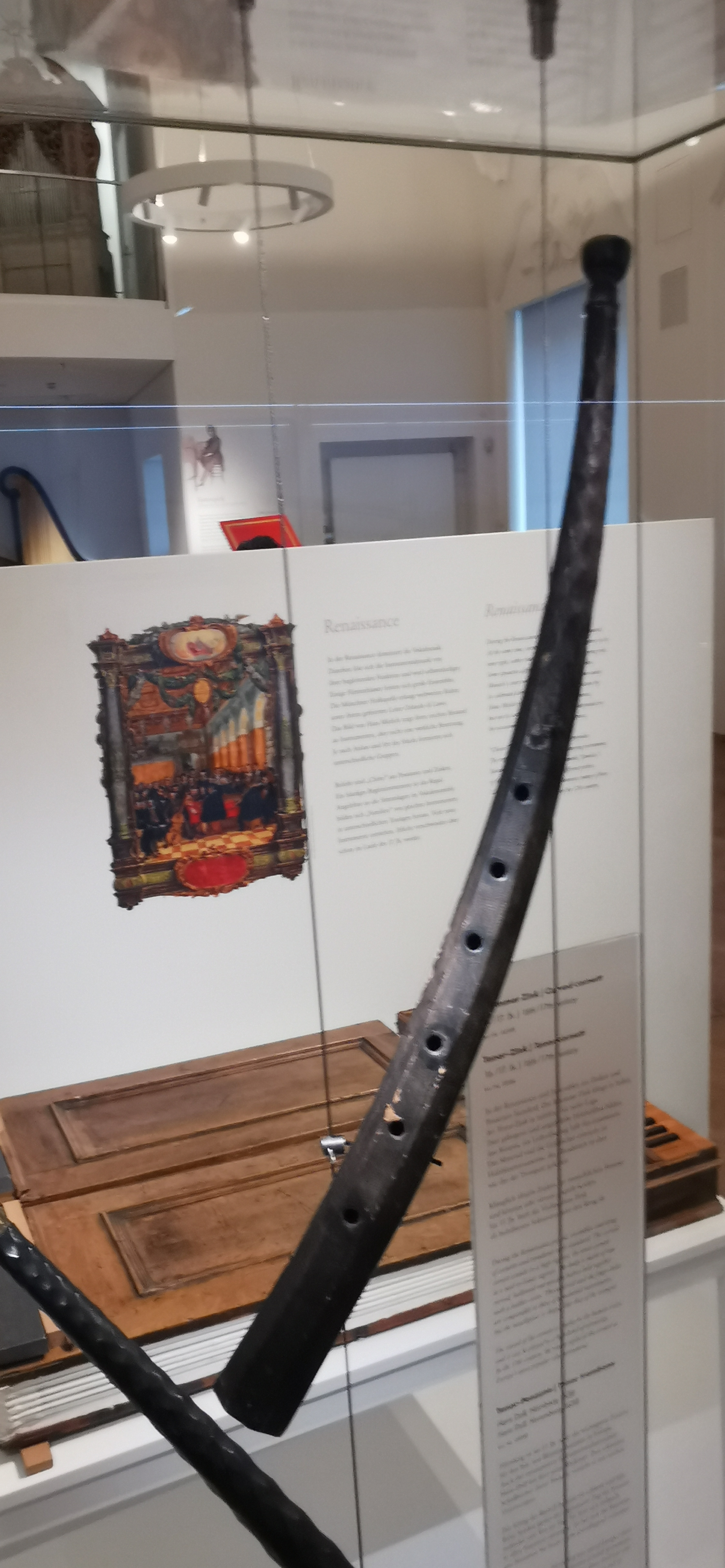
Curved cornet. Lines of the octagonal body are visible.

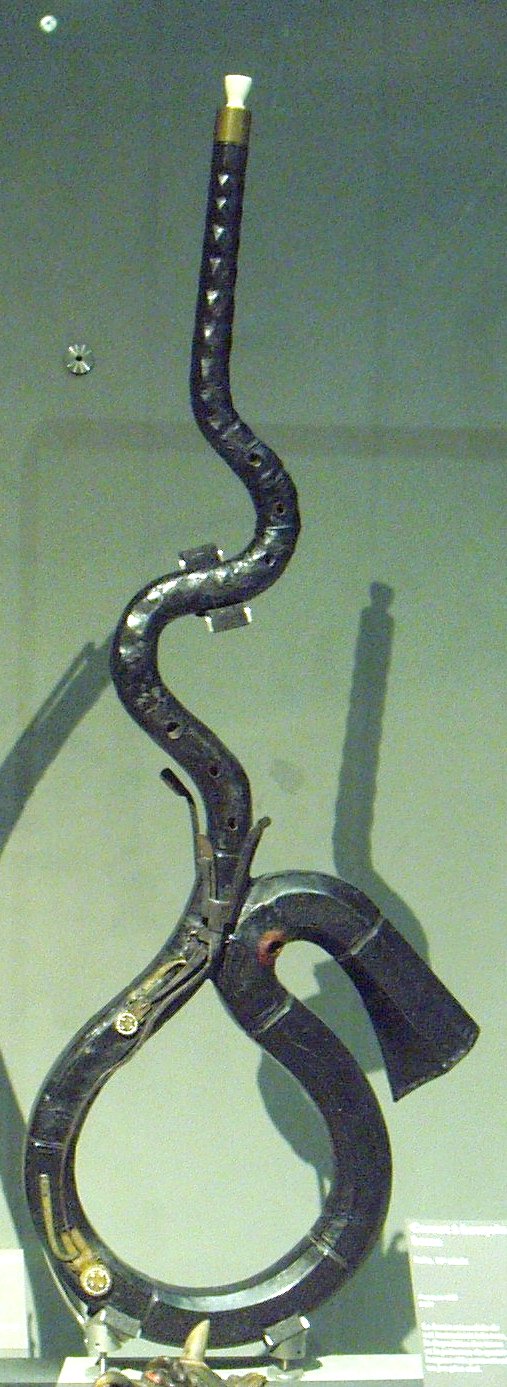
Contrebass de cornet à bouquin, Paris Conservatoire Museum.

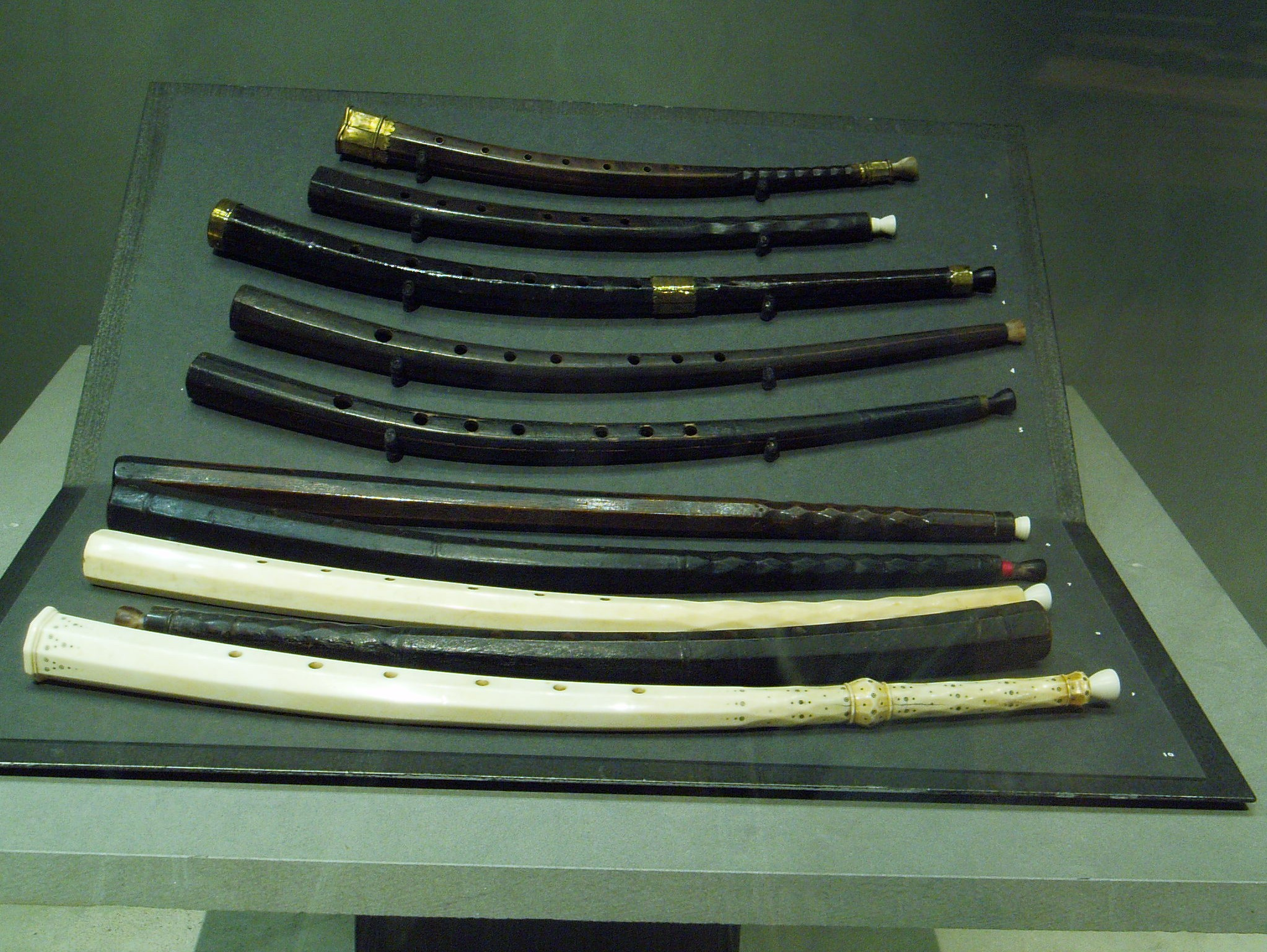
Curved cornetts from the Cité de la Musique, Philharmonie de Paris. Black cornets (wood covered with leather or black parchment) and ivory cornets.

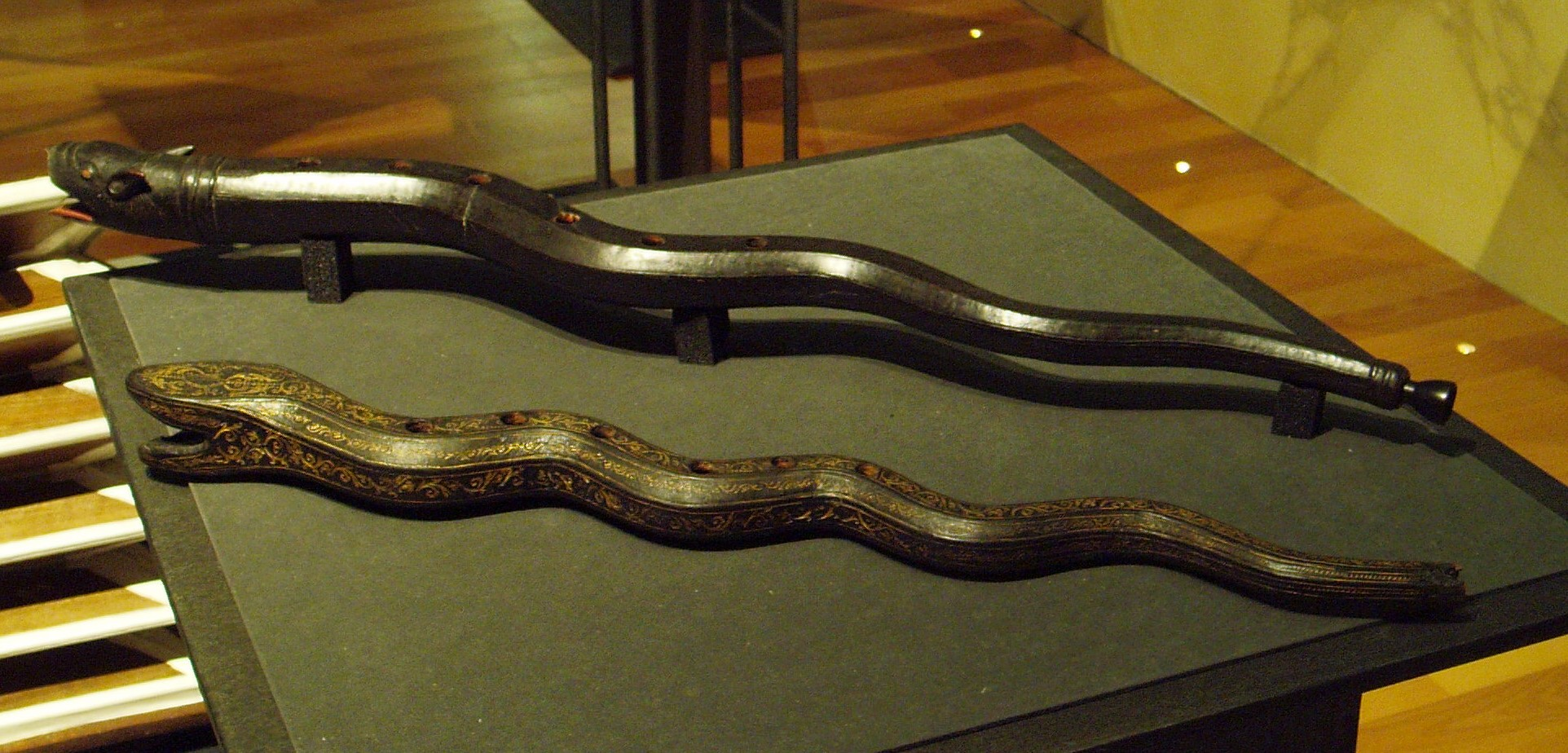
Possible tenor cornetts, which were sometimes called lizards. From the Cité de la Musique, Philharmonie de Paris.

=== Straight cornett ===
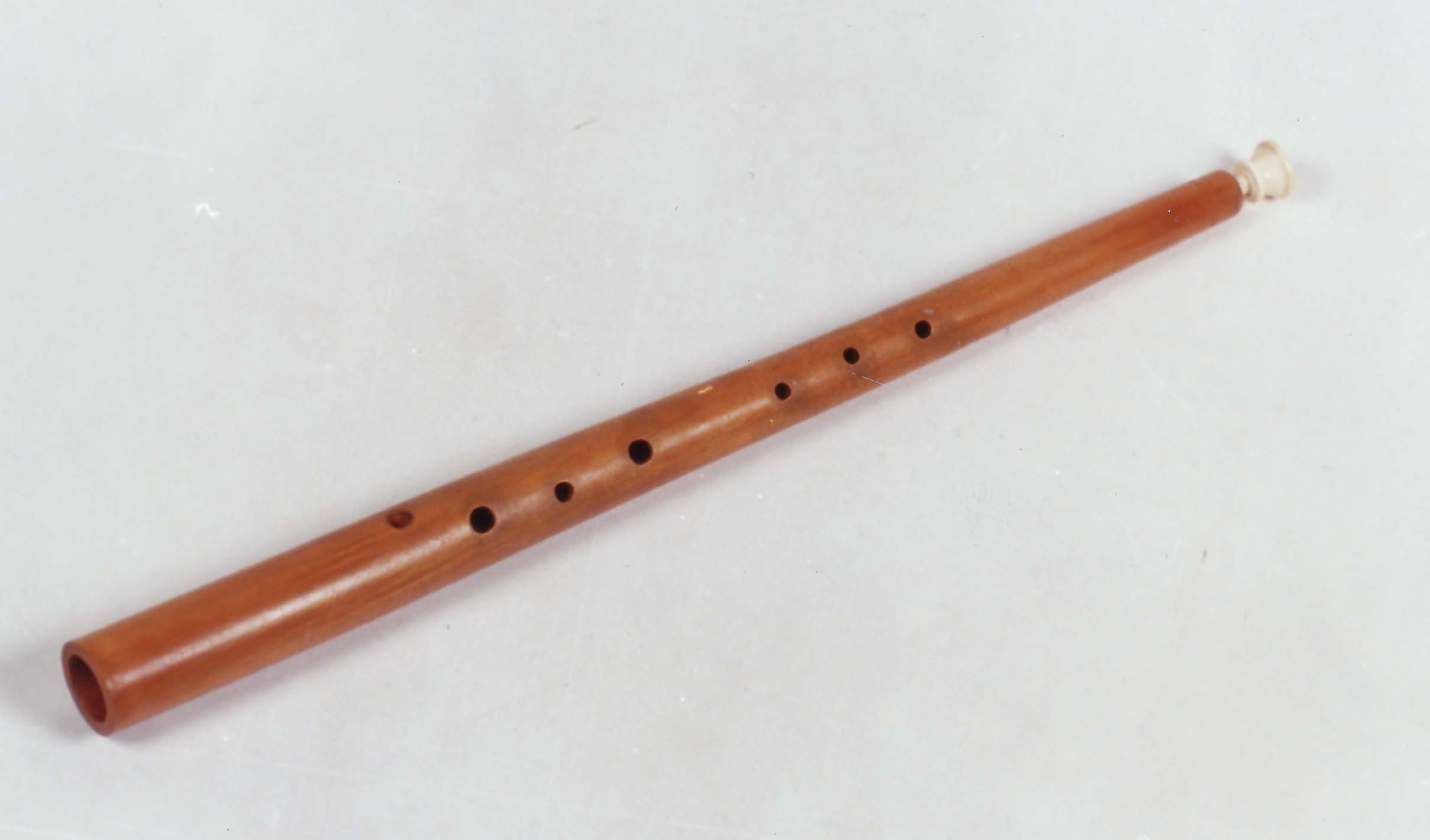
Straight cornett, 20th century

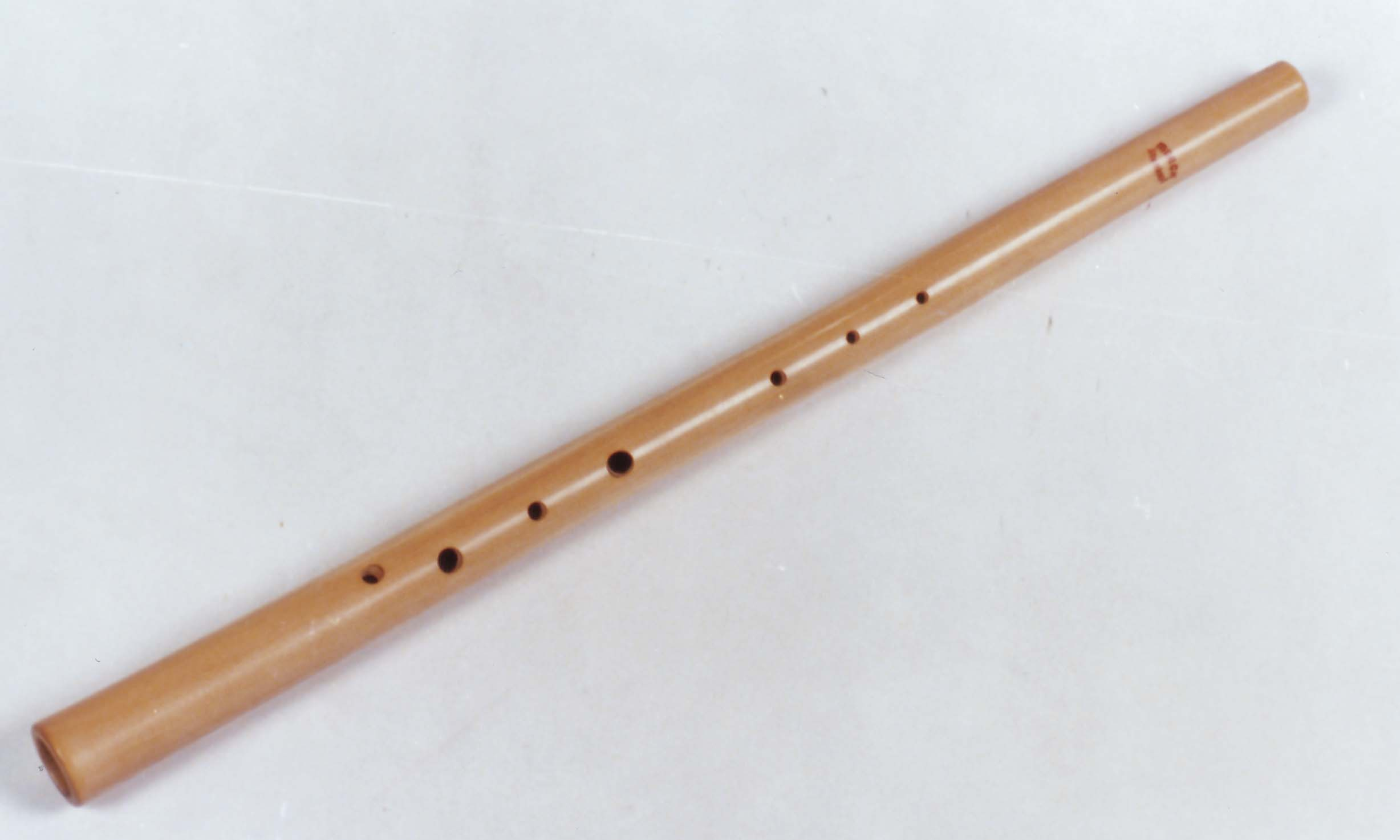
Mute cornett

20th century 7-hole cornetts (plus thumbhole)

The common treble cornett was also made as a straight cornett (German: gerader Zink, gelber Zink, Italian: cornetto diritto or cornetto bianco) and usually light-colored, as the yellow boxwood was not covered in leather. It has conical bore and body that does not curve. The specific instrument differs from the mute cornett by having a removable mouthpiece. Surviving instruments in museums are mainly treble with a range of A_{3} to A_{5}. A few survive as tenor instruments, range C_{3} to D_{5}.

=== Mute cornett ===
A mute cornett (French: cornet muet, German: stiller Zink, Italian: cornetto muto) is a straight cornett with a narrower bore and integrated mouthpiece carved into the end of the instrument's body. The instrument tapers in thickness, until at the top it is about 1.3 centimetres (0.51 in) wide. The instruments were mainly treble cornetts, tuned to the same range as the curved treble cornett, G_{3} to A_{5}. The others found in museums are soprano cornetts, also tuned like curved instruments to E_{4} to E_{6}.

This instrument's name tells something of its tonal nature. Its "gentle, soft and sweet" sound is different than the other cornetts because of its mouthpiece, and can be used in a consort of viols or recorders. The mouthpiece is similar to that in a French horn; instead of being a cup like the other cornetts, it is a cone, about 9 millimetres (0.35 in) deep. Inside it transitions from cone to instrumental bore smoothly, without "sharpness." On the outside, there isn't an obvious lip carved.

Praetorius drew a tenor mute cornett, with a seventh hole covered and labeled that a lower note could be reached by covering the base. In that range, the six holes with thumb hole could have delivered A_{3} to F_{5}. The extra plate would make it G_{3} to F_{5}, with the base covered F_{3} to F_{5}.

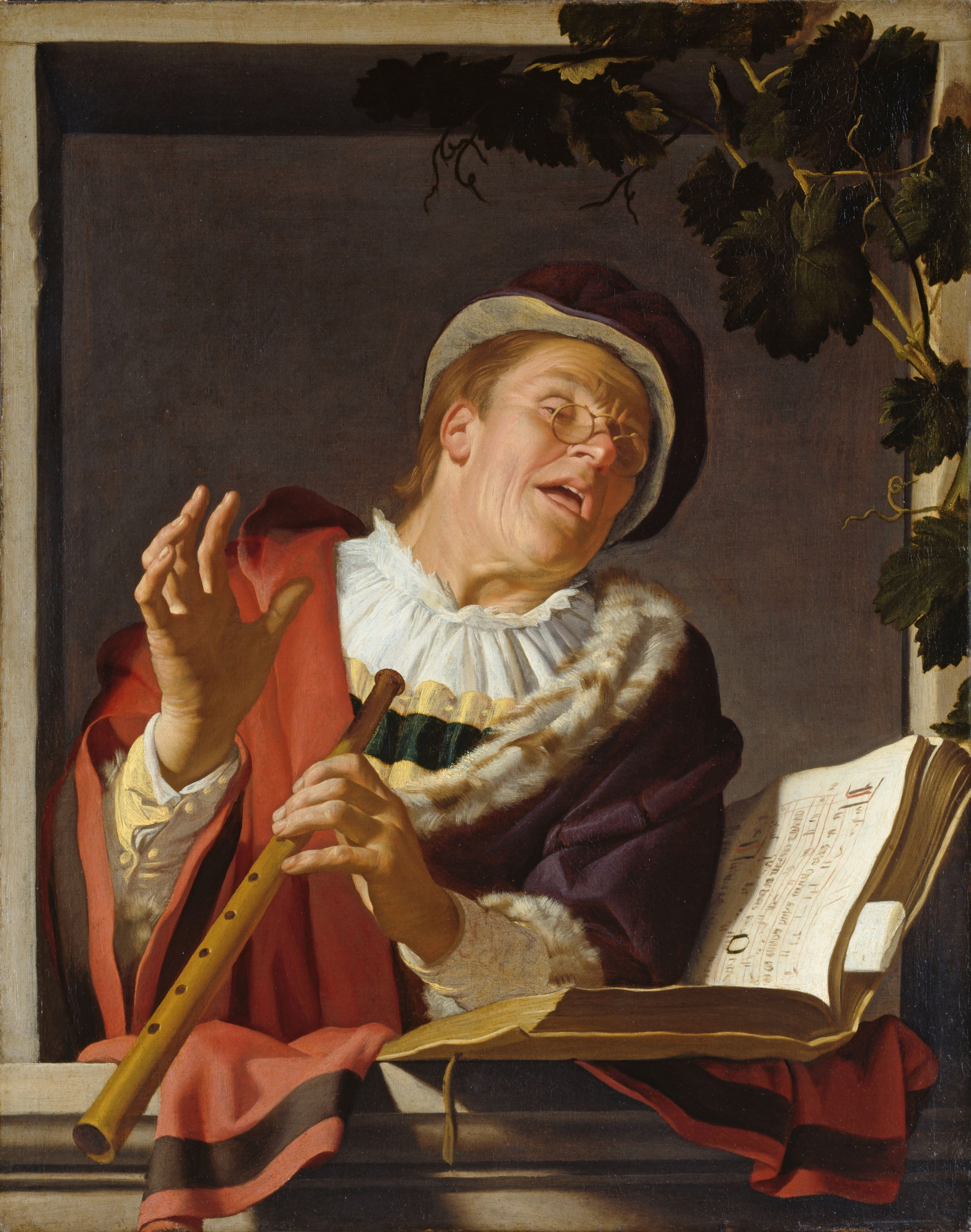
1623 identified as a cornett. Since the mouthpiece is carved into the body, this would be a mute cornet. However, this example has a lip at the mouthpiece.

== History ==
=== Origins ===
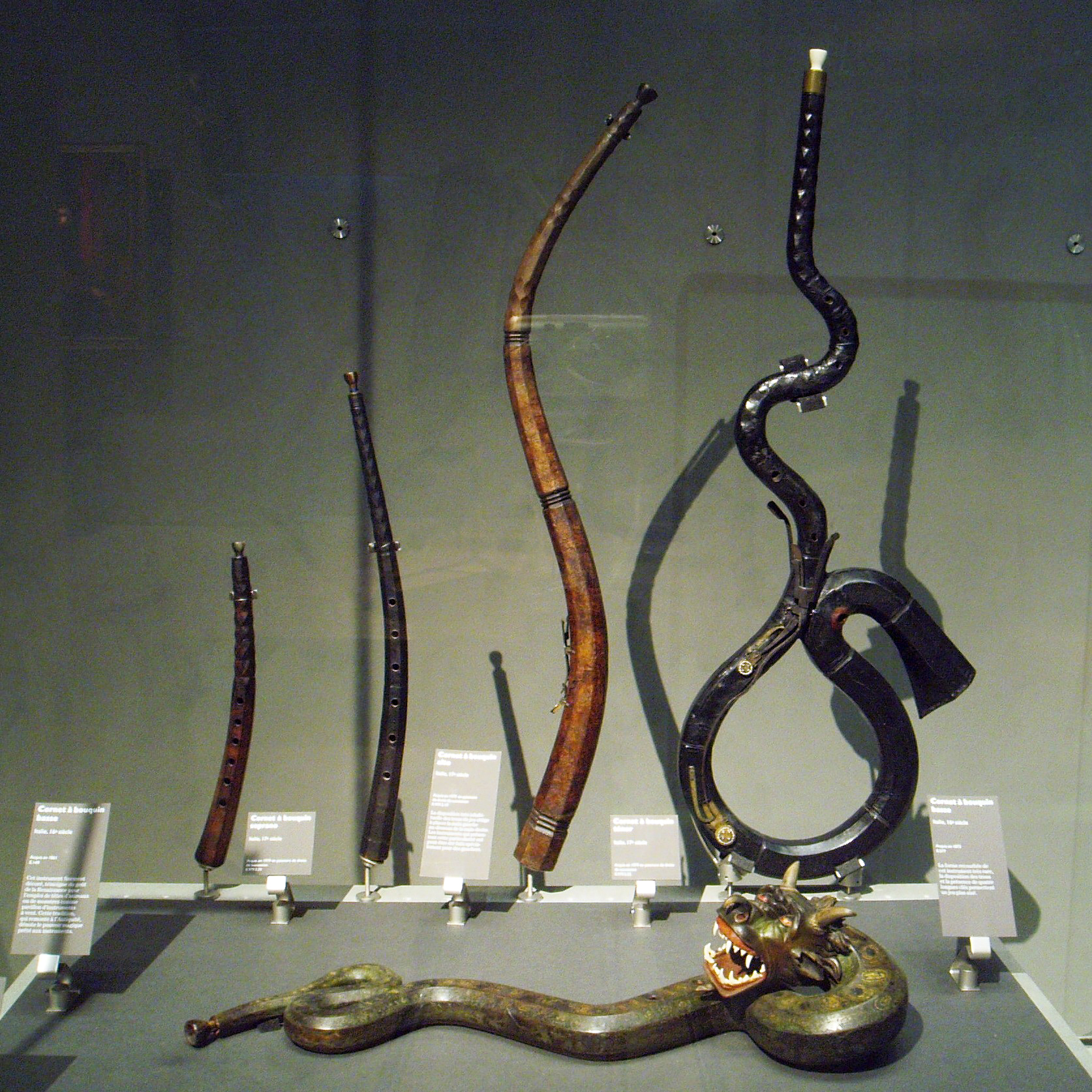
16th and 17th century cornetts at the Cité de la Musique, Philharmonie de Paris. From the left, back row: *cornettino, 17th century *alto or treble cornet, 17th century *cornone, tenor cornett or bass de cornet à bouquin, 17th century *contrebass de cornet à bouquin (bass cornett), 16th century Front row: *tenor cornet, 17th century.

Aurignacian pipes, fashioned with four finger holes 26,000–40,000 years ago from the slender bones of bird wings or mammoth ivory, have long been considered flutes. Recovered from Vogelherdhöhle and other caves in the Swabian Jura in Germany, they are among the oldest musical instruments yet discovered. British music archaeologist Graeme Lawson found that a replica of a complete specimen played as a flute has an indistinct whispery sound, but produces the first five notes of the diatonic series in a clear, strident tone when played as an end-blown lip reed instrument. He contends that this method of playing is supported by microscopic wear patterns, the absence of a fipple or blowhole, and the well-rounded end aperture.

In modern history, the cornett has been considered by musical historians to be a development of the medieval horn, such as a cow's horn. Francis Galpin believed the horns preceding the cornett to be goat horns.

Plain horns in the shape of animal horns have been found in medieval European art as far back as the Utrecht Psalter in the 9th century. However, horns with fingerholes also began appearing in manuscript miniatures in the 10th century. By the 12th century, these were being carved with a six sided or 8 sided exterior. In the 11th century, some of the fingerhole horns began to be made longer and thinner, beginning to take on the appearance of the cornett.

Horn, fingerhole horn, cornett

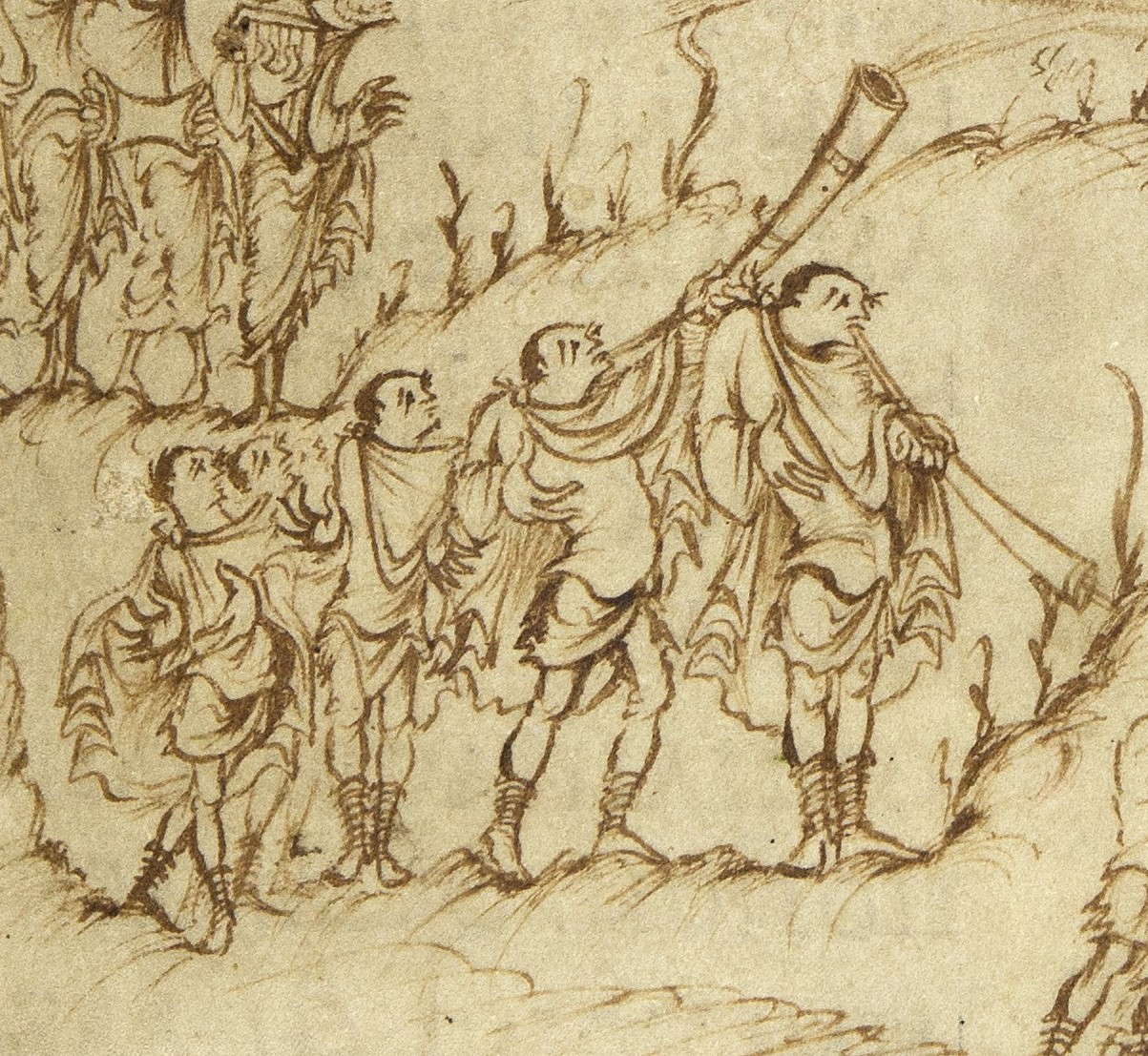
Utrecht Psalter, 9th century, France. Horns showing signs of assembly (bands around outside) into the shape of cows horns.

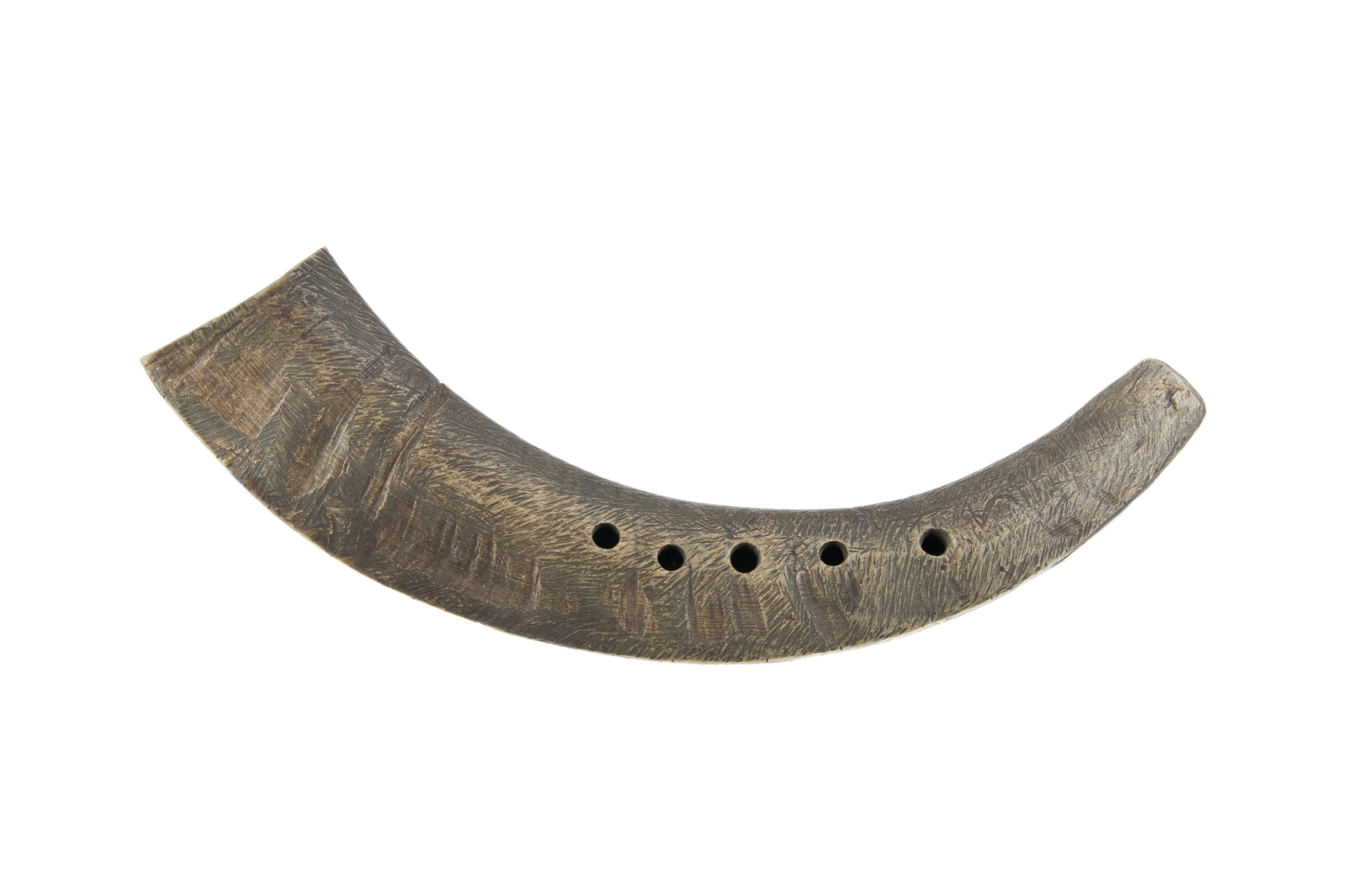
A bockhorn, fingerhole horn

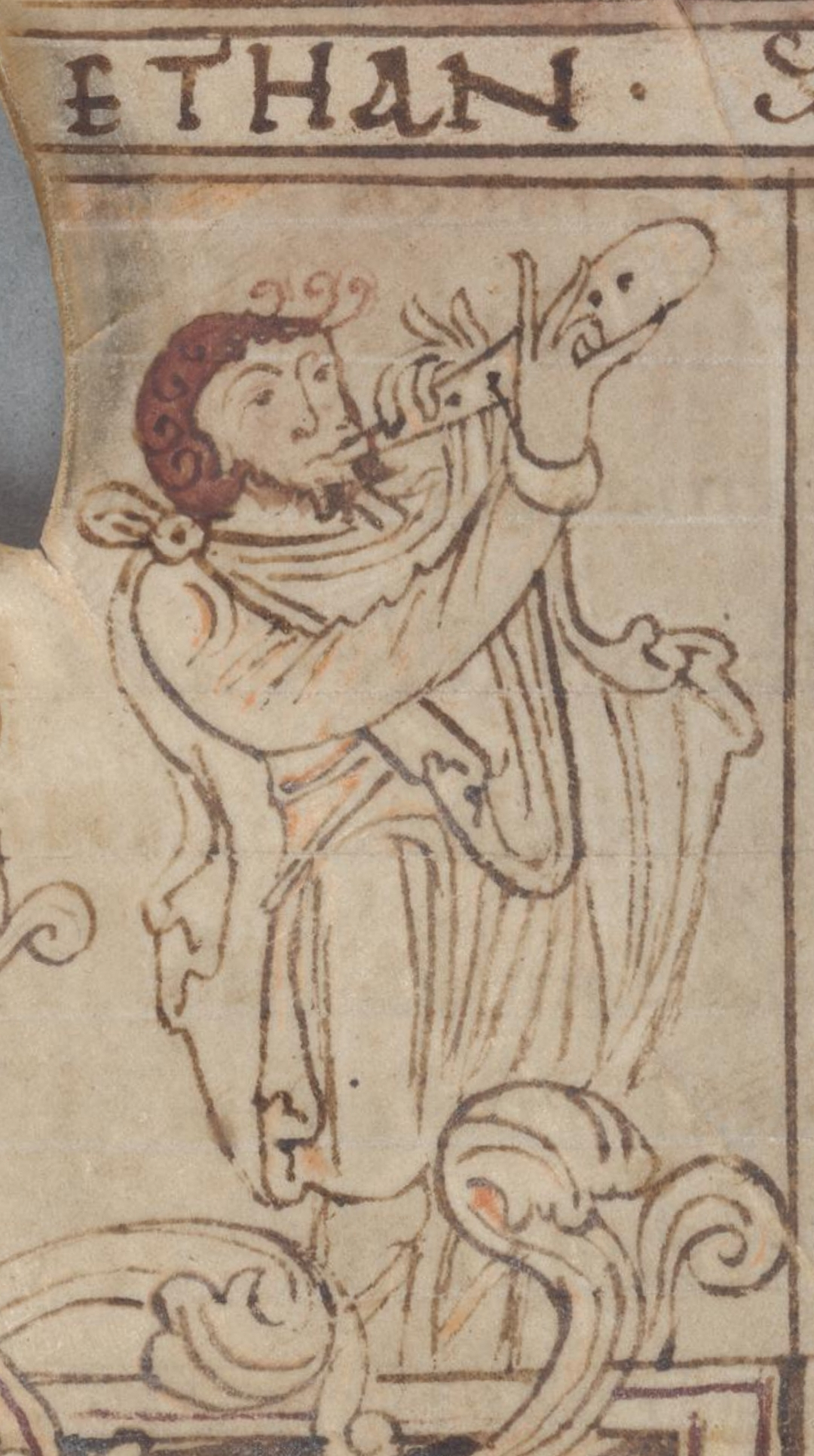
Galpin identified this as a cornett. 11th century Winchcombe Psalter (MS Ff.1.23)

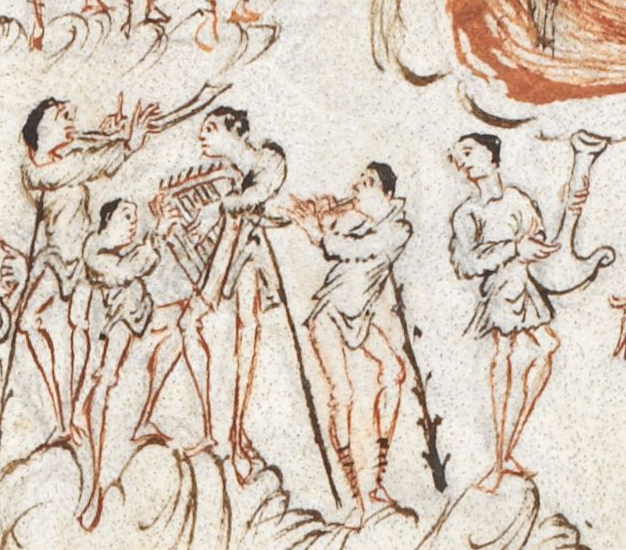
1000-1050 England. From the left a fingerhole horn/trumpet, harp, fingerhole horn/trumpet, lute. Harley Psalter; art copied or inspired from earlier Utrecht Psalter. Galpin cited this manuscript as evidence of cornett in England in the 11th century

The French coradoiz, rendered now as cor à doigts, meant "fingerhole horn", was seen in the 13th to 15th centuries.

The earliest cowhorn instruments were played with one hand covering four or fewer fingerholes and the other stopping the bell to create additional tones, much like on a French horn. In Northern Europe, these horns, referred to in Scandinavian languages as bukkehorns, were made from natural animal horns.

The name cornet was printed in English in the Morte d'Arthure, completed by Sir Thomas Mallory about 1470.

The cornett in its current form was developed by about 1500, as an improvement over earlier designs of fingerhole horns.

That was the path that led to the curved cornetts; another way led to the straight cornetts. In central Europe, cornetts were made from wood turned on a lathe; the fusion of these two instrument-building traditions as the cornett advanced in melodic capability explains the coexistence of the straight and curved cornetts, with the form of the latter most likely being a skeuomorphic trait derived from animal horns.

=== Ends and beginnings ===
The cornett was at the height of its popularity between 1550 and 1650. The instrument had declined by the 18th century. When the instrument was needed in the 19th century, it had gone extinct. Efforts to re-create it were not immediately successful and other instruments have been used in an attempt to replace it in classical music. These include the soprano saxophone, trumpet and oboe. Since the 19th century, the instrument is being made again and materials used for the body have widened to include resins. Recorded music of the instrument can be found.

Prominent cornettists today include Roland Wilson (ensemble Musica Fiata), Jean Tubéry (La Fenice), Arno Paduch (Johann Rosenmüller Ensemble), and Bruce Dickey (Concerto Palatino).

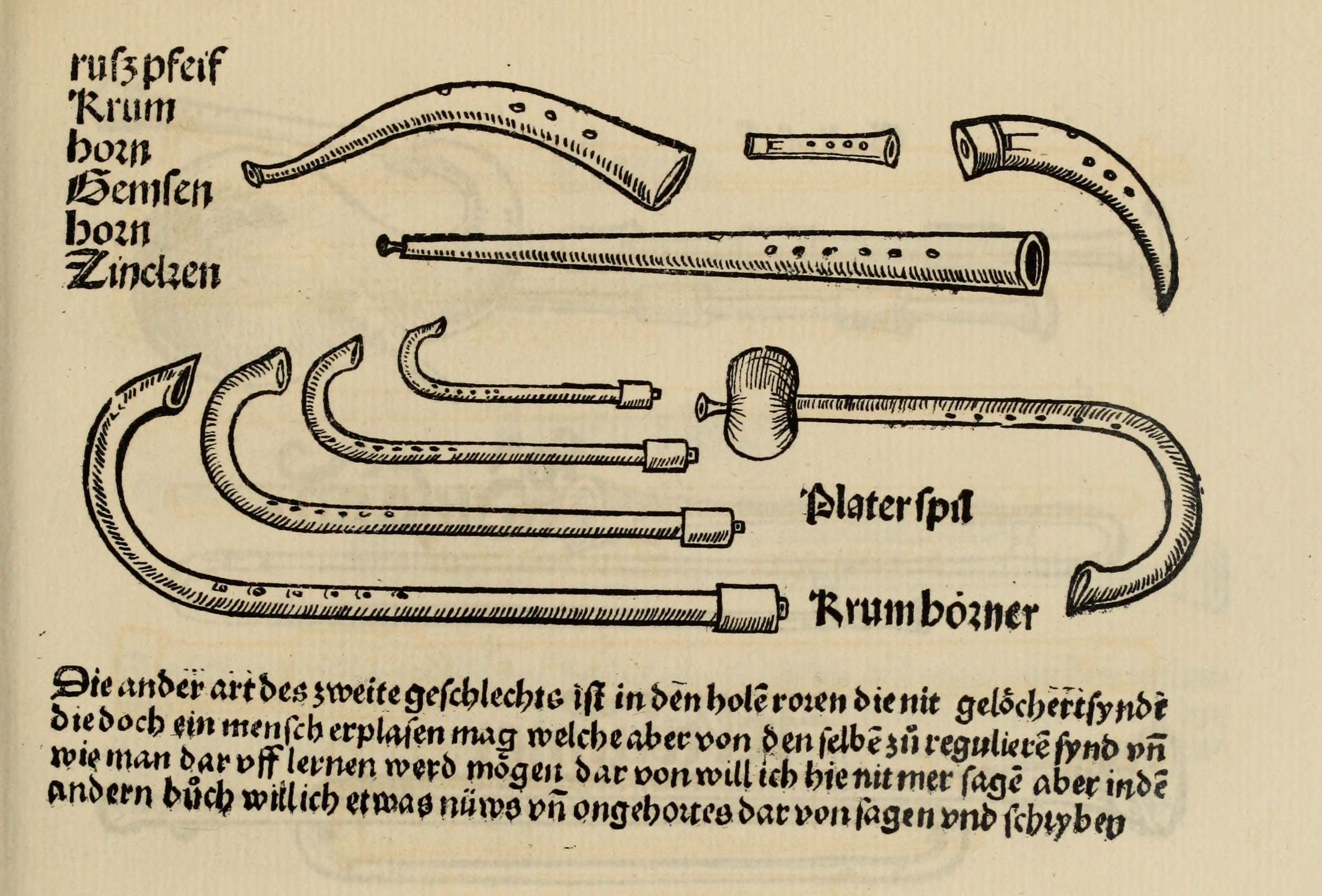
Page from Sebastian Virdung's 1511 book Musica Getutscht und Ausgezogen. Top left corner: a curved cornett labeled Zincken. Below it is a straight cornett, also Zincken. Top right corner, a Gemshorn

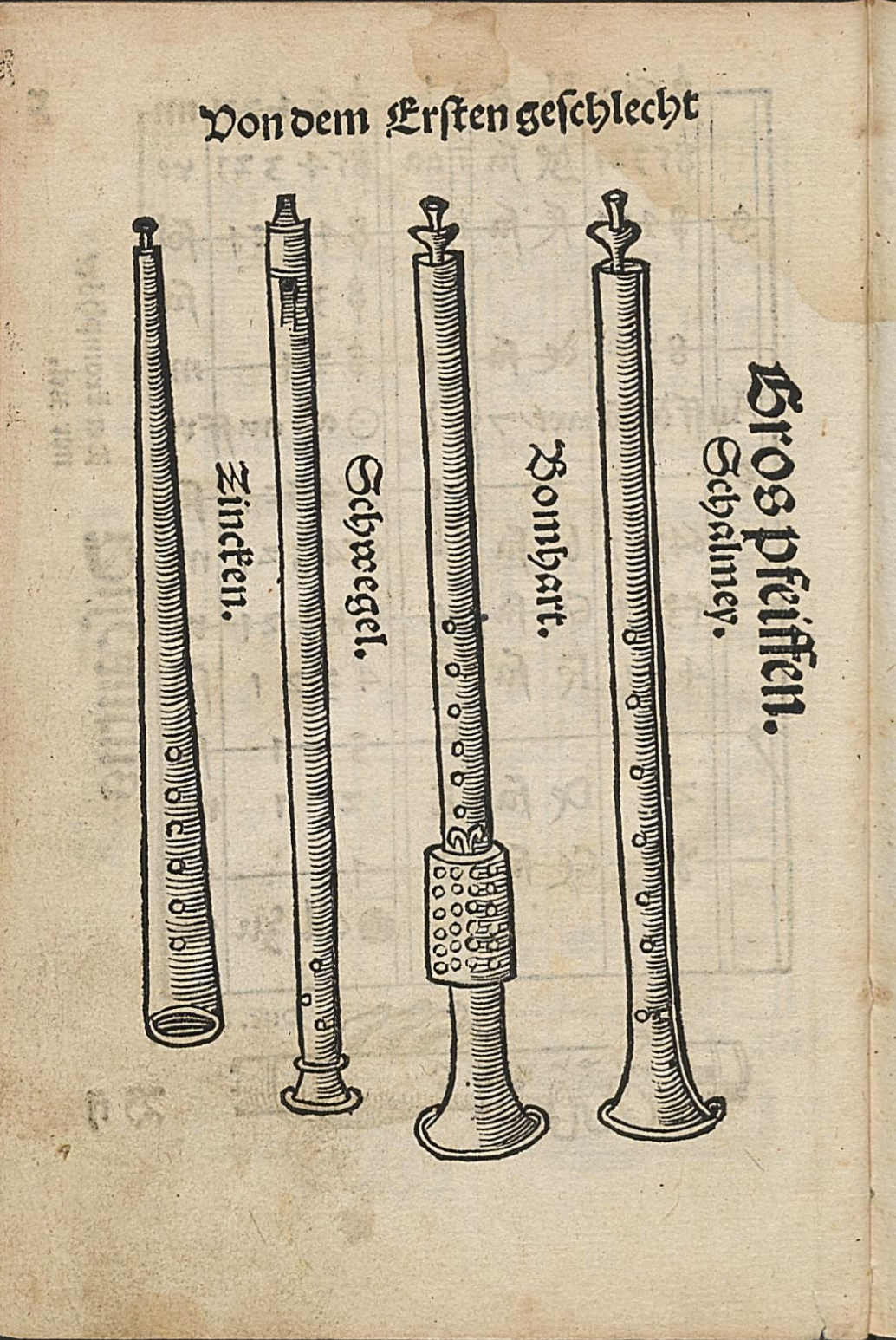
Cornett, shawms from Martin Agricola's book "Musica instrumentalis deudsch", published 1529. From left: straight cornett, three-hole pipe, bombard, shawm.

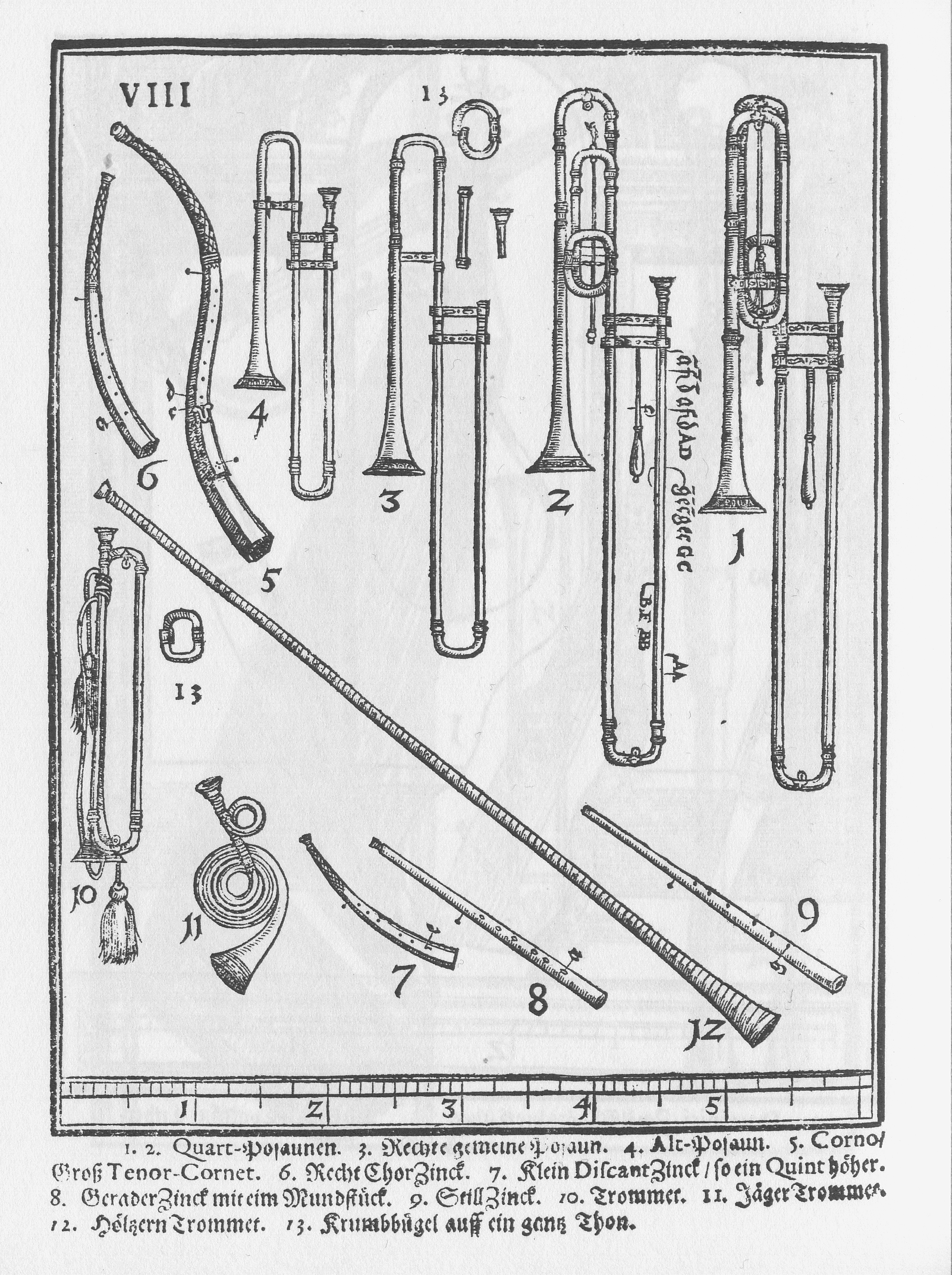
1620 Cornetts, by number: 5 tenor cornett, 6 choral zink, 7 cornettino, 8 "Gerader" zink, 9 mute cornett.

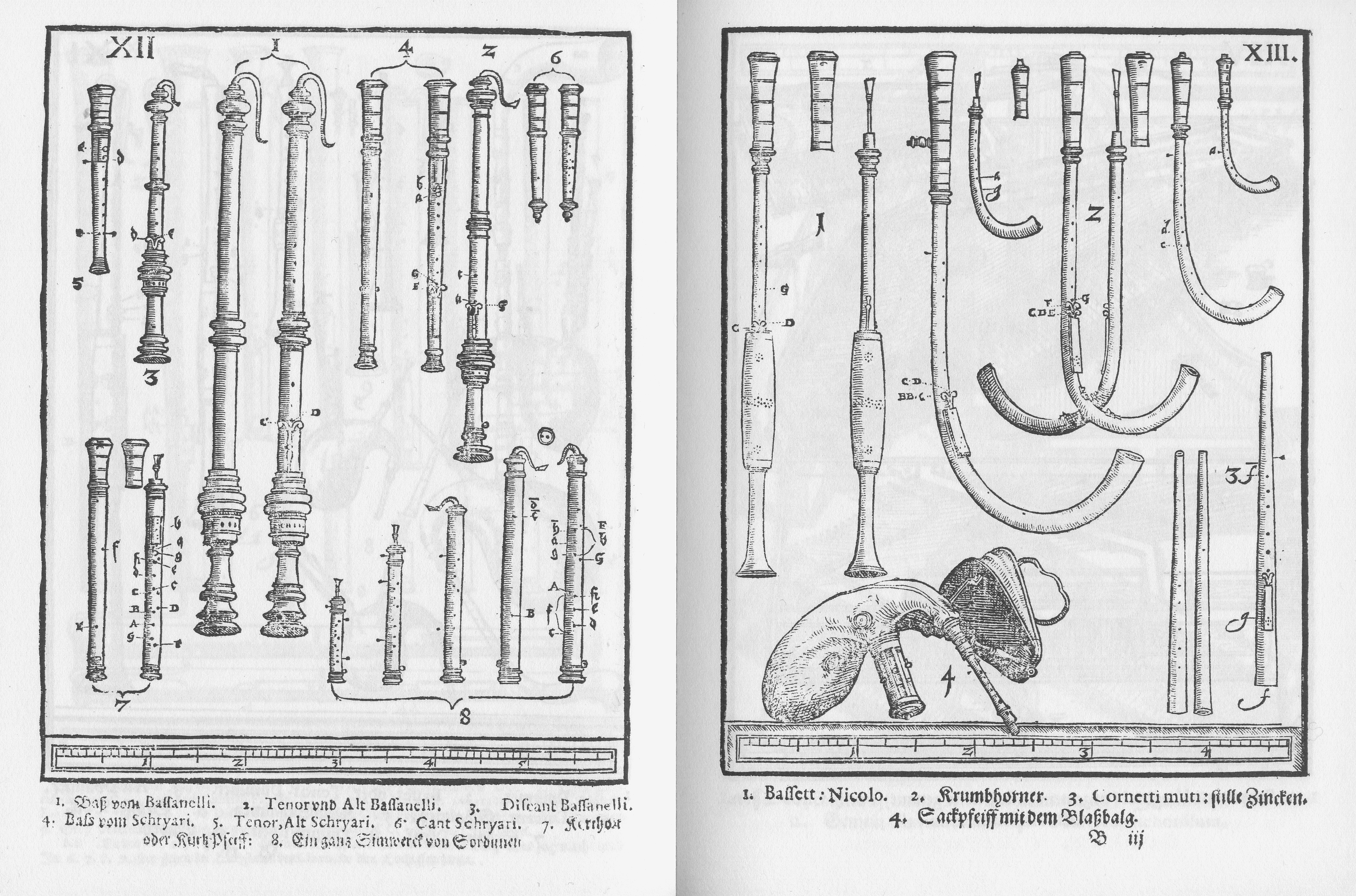
1620 Right page: 3 Mute cornetts, including one with a key

== Music for the cornett ==
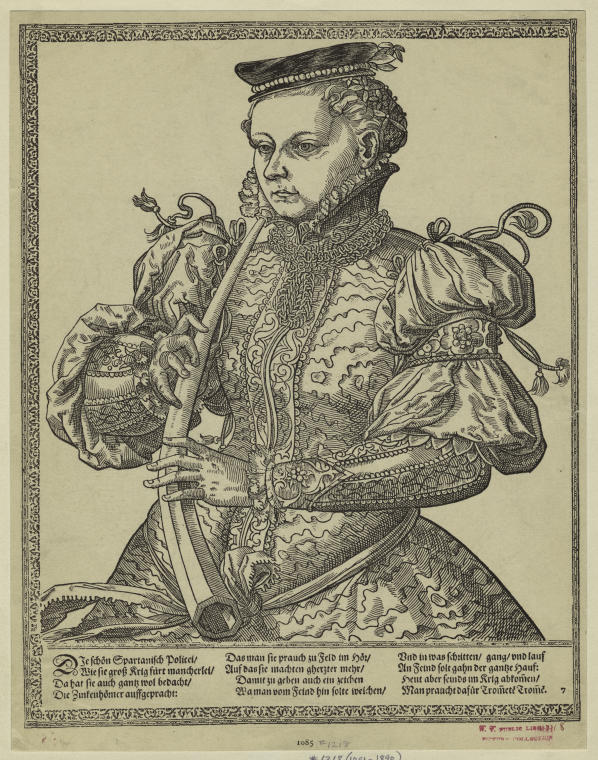
Tobias Stimmer woodcut of a woman with an alto cornett, c. 1570–1577

=== Virtuoso performance ===
The cornett, among other aerophones, were commonly used for virtuosic musical performances, equivalent to performances by a lead singer or violinist. A relatively large amount of solo music for the cornett (and/or violin) survives.

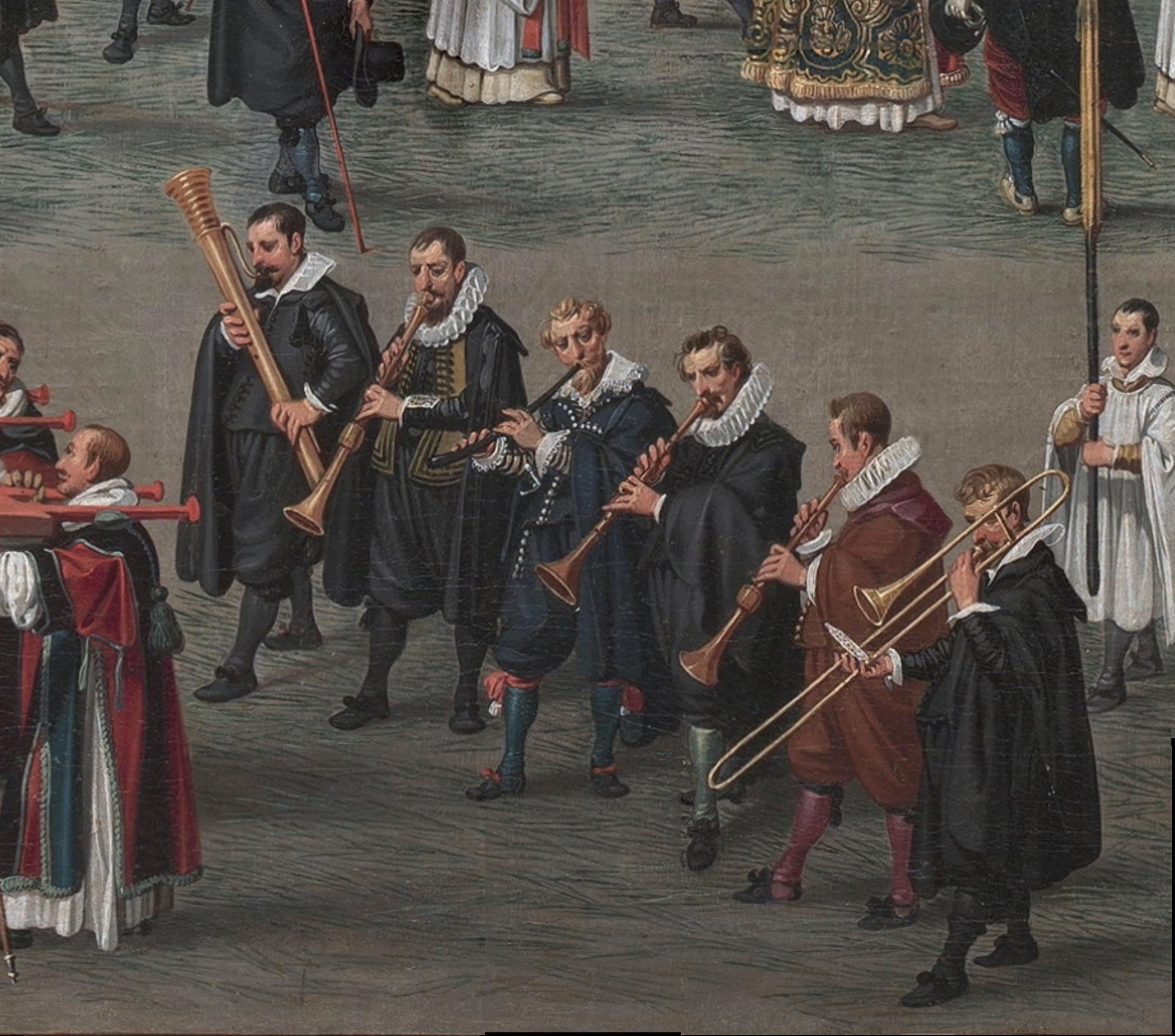
Musicians from 'Procession in honour of Our Lady of Sablon in Brussels.' Early 17th-century Flemish alta cappella. From left to right: bass dulcian, alto shawm, treble cornett, soprano shawm, alto shawm, tenor sackbut.

Giovanni Bassano was a virtuoso early player of the cornett, and Giovanni Gabrieli wrote much of his polychoral, with Bassano playing it. Heinrich Schütz also used the instrument extensively, especially in his earlier work; he had studied in Venice with Gabrieli and was likely acquainted with Bassano's playing.

The use of the instrument had declined by 1700, although the instrument was still common in Europe until the late 18th century. Johann Sebastian Bach, Georg Philipp Telemann and their German contemporaries used both the cornett and cornettino in cantatas to play in unison with the soprano voices of the choir. Occasionally, these composers allocated a solo part to the cornetto (see Bach's cantata O Jesu Christ, meins Lebens Licht, BWV 118). Alessandro Scarlatti used the cornetto or pairs of cornetts in a number of his operas. Johann Joseph Fux used a pair of mute cornetts in a Requiem.

It was scored for by Gluck, in his opera Orfeo ed Euridice (he suggested the soprano trombone as an alternative) and features in the TV theme music Testament by Nigel Hess, released in 1983.

The cornett was chosen to play colla parte (in which instrumentalists play the same notes as the vocal part) in works by Bach. These include Christ lag in Todes Banden, BWV 4 (paired with trombones) and Gottlob! nun geht das Jahr zu Ende, BWV 28 (paired with trombones).

=== Popular performance ===
Music books allowed non-professional musicians to learn instruments and play together. Such books included music theory, how to read sheet music, and instructions for how to reach notes on instruments. Professional musicians performed in public spaces and as part of official pomp before the country's residents. Images of heaven reflected a musicality that showed heavenly orchestras performing before God, and instruments were brought into churches.

Public performances where the cornett might be played included the alta capella and the Collegium Musicum.

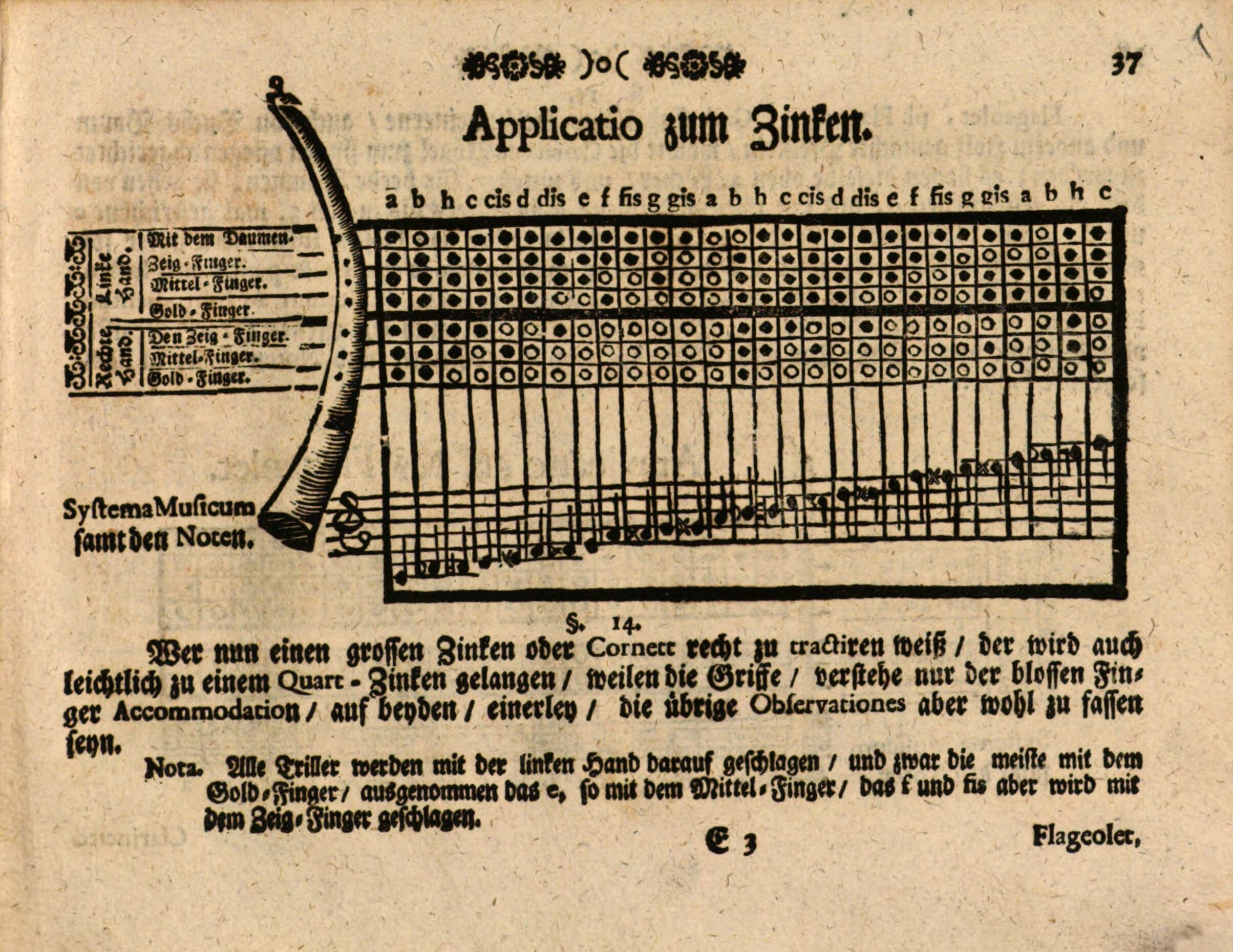
1732 Cornett fingering chart, Museum Musicum Theoretico-Practicum

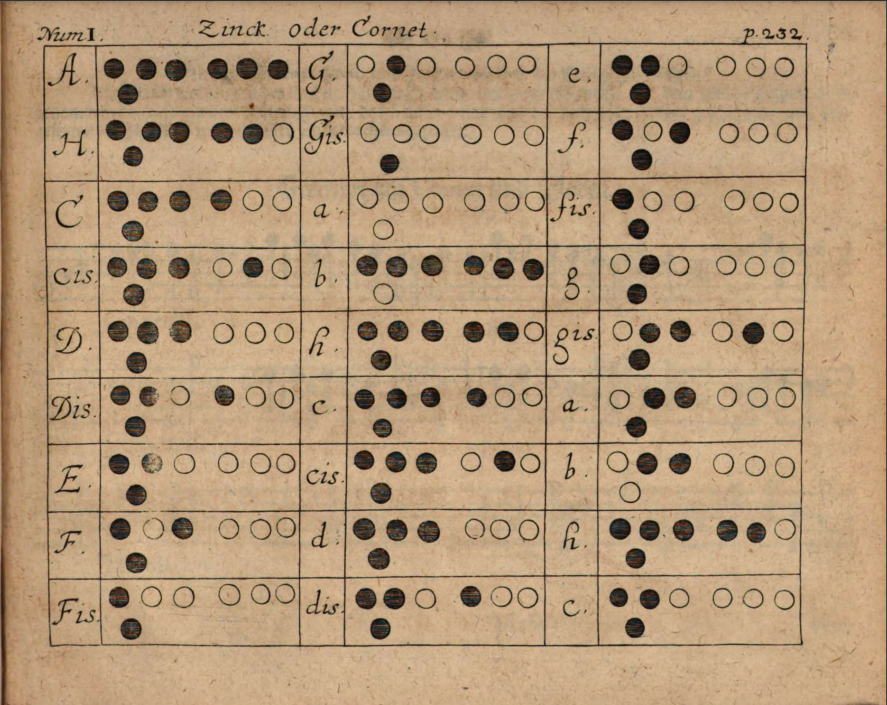
Cornet finger chart from Grund-richtiger Unterricht der Musicalischen Kunst by Daniel Speer, 1697

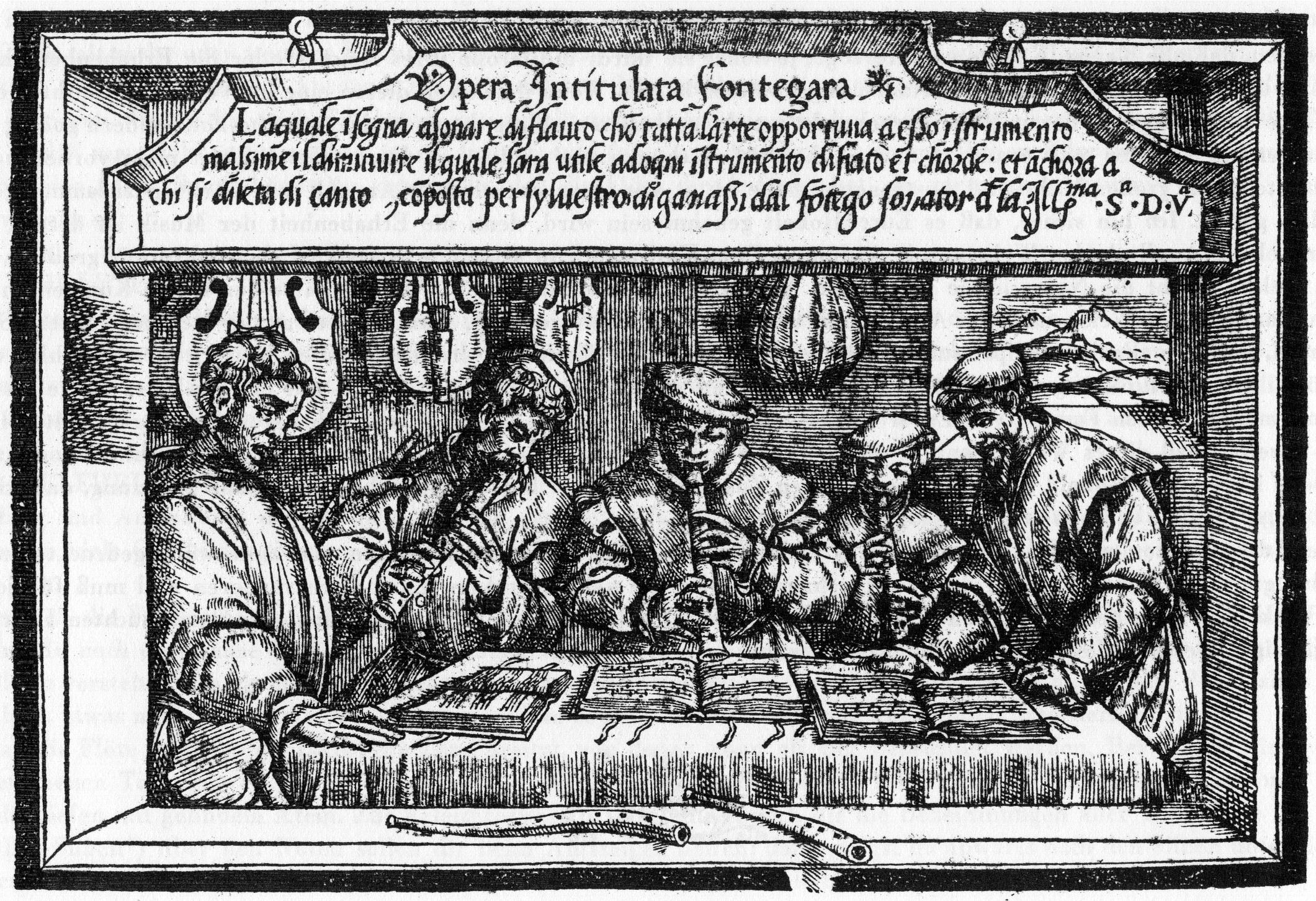
Art from Opera intitulata Fontegara with curved cornett and straight cornett at bottom

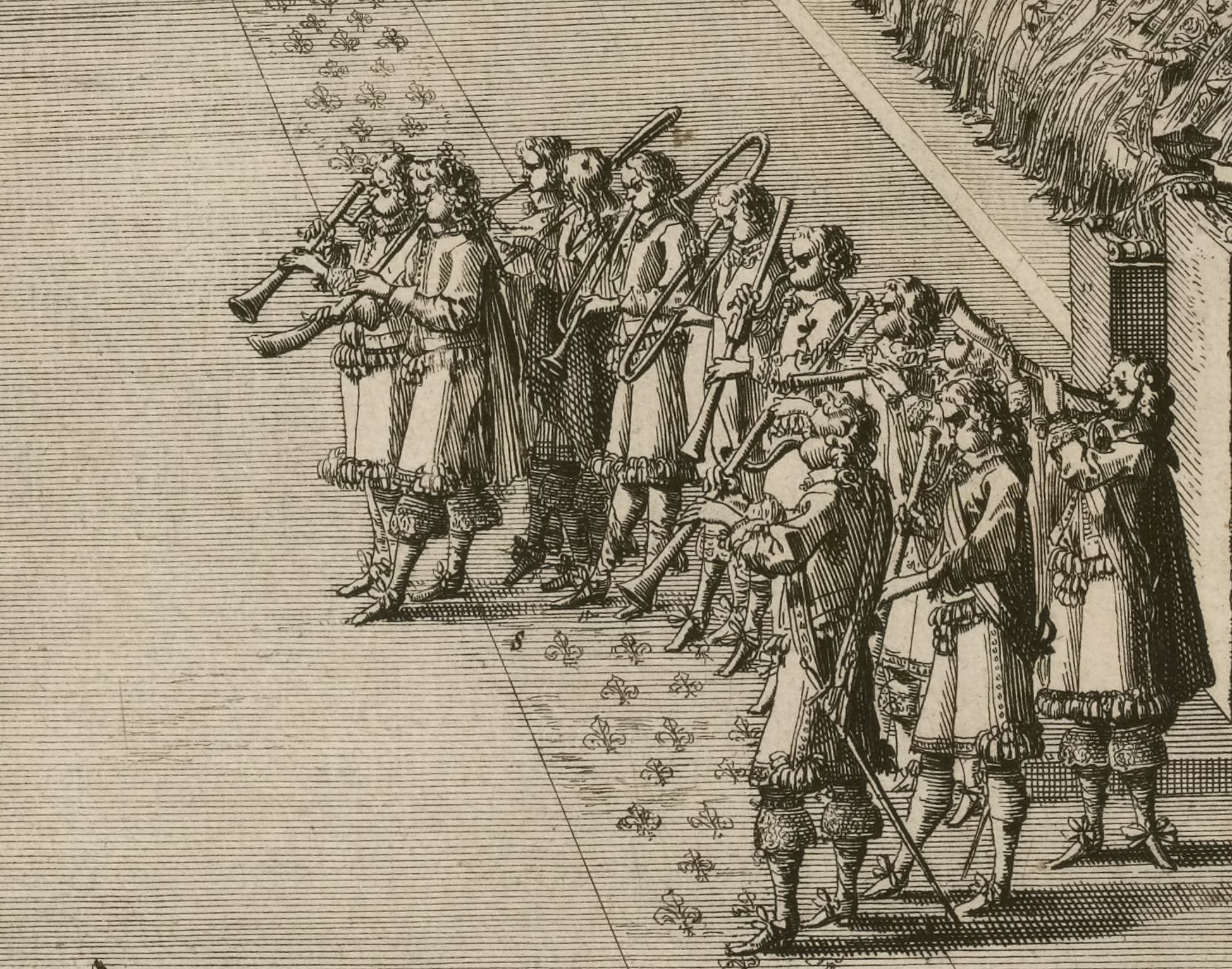
Cornetts, sackbuts and shawms at the coronation of Louis XIV

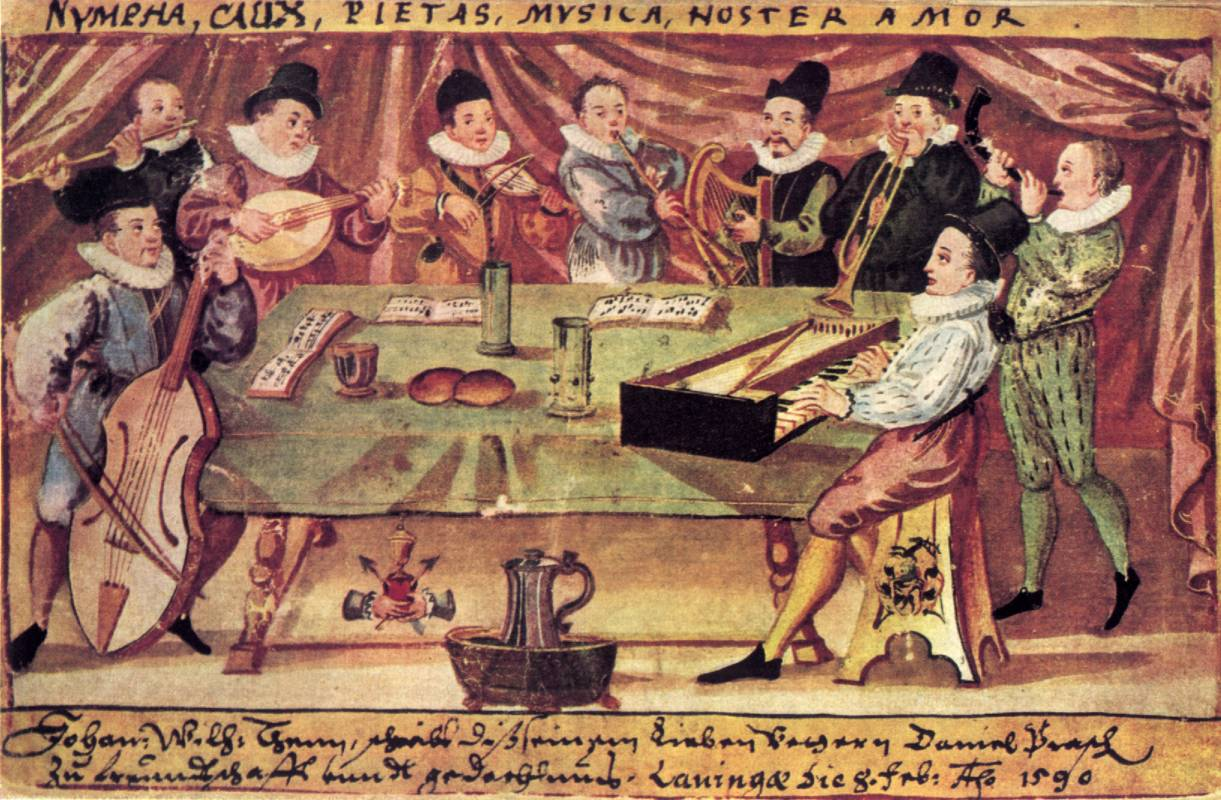
1590, Collegium Musicum, Lauingen, Germany. From the left: viol, flute, mandörgen or gittern, fiddle or rebec, shawm, harp, slide trumpet or clarion trumpet, cornett, clavichord.

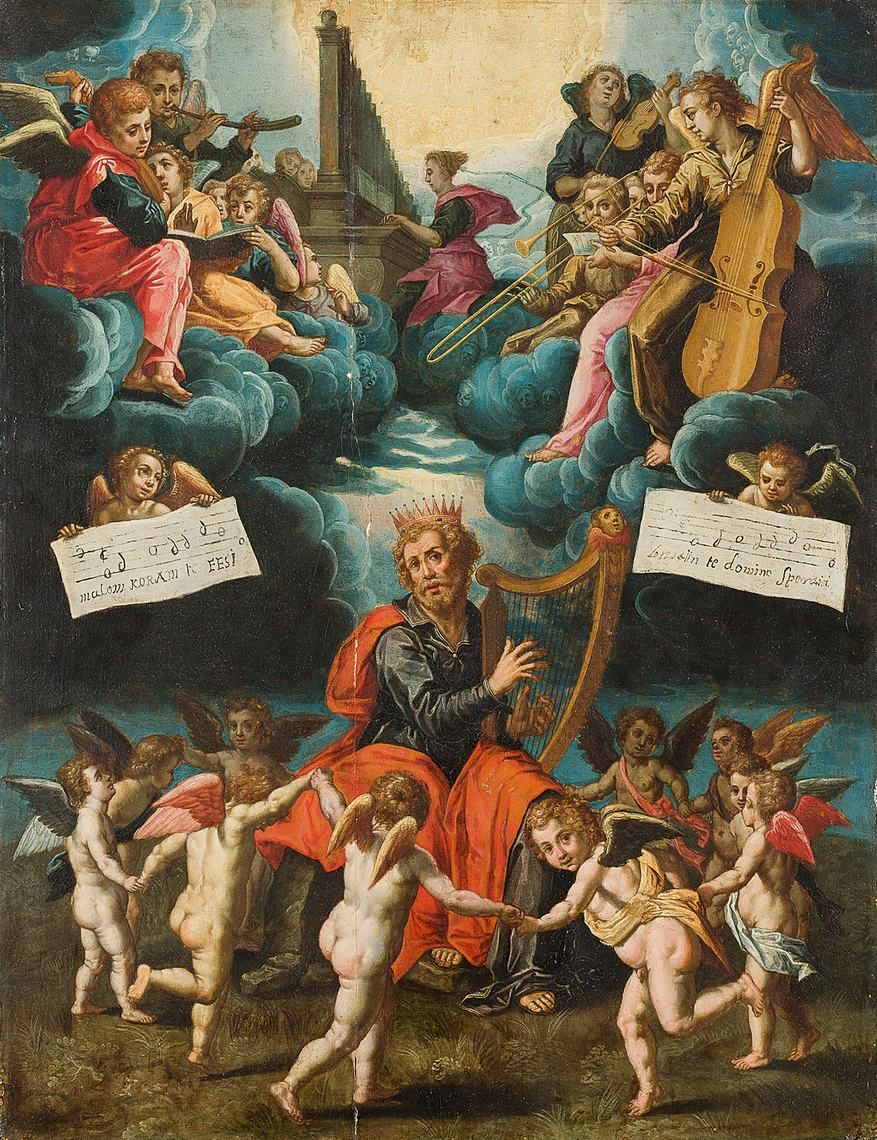
Religious celebration in Heaven

=== Liturgical performance ===
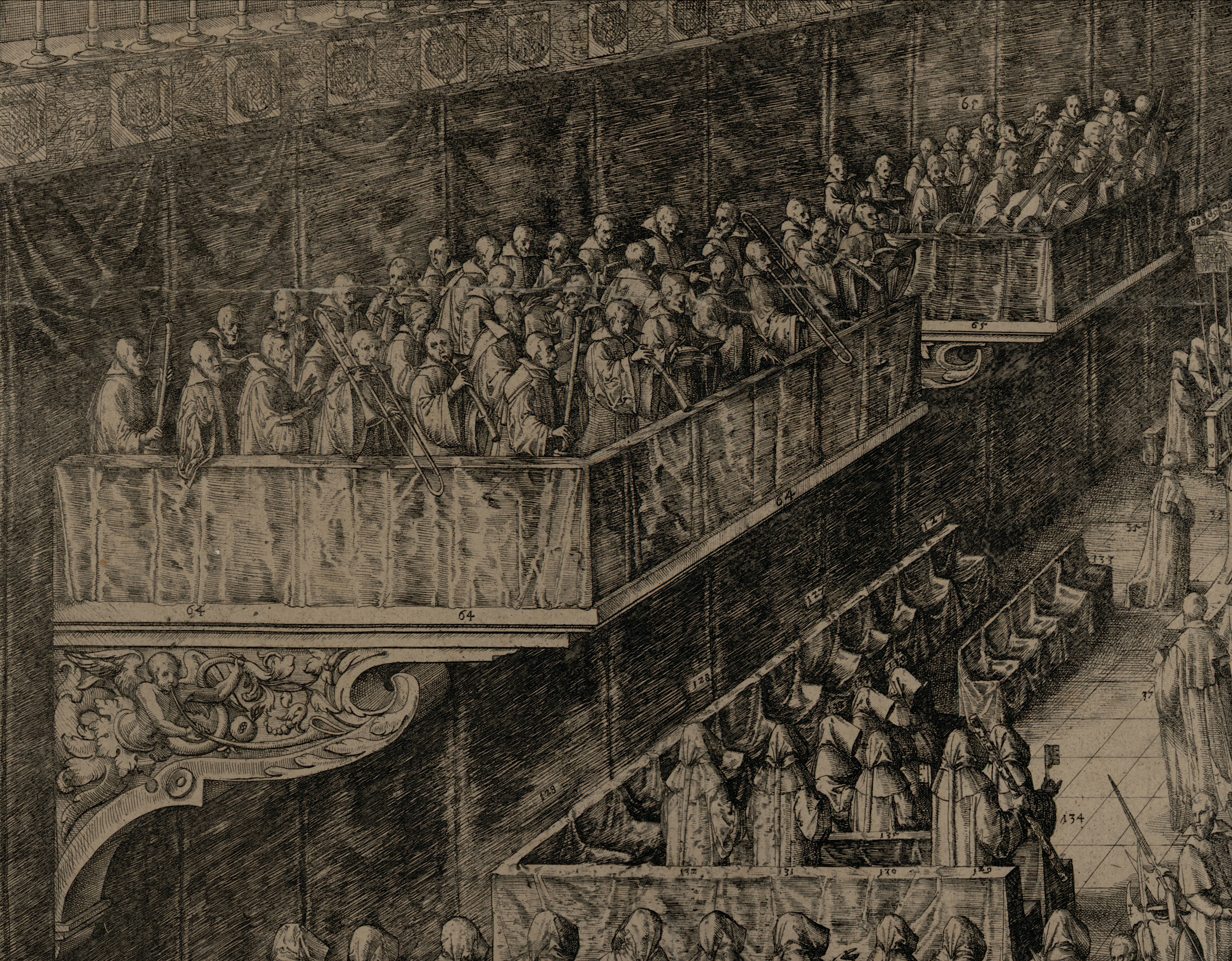
1611 Musicians in the gallery of a cathedral, from the funeral of Charles III, Duke of Lorraine.

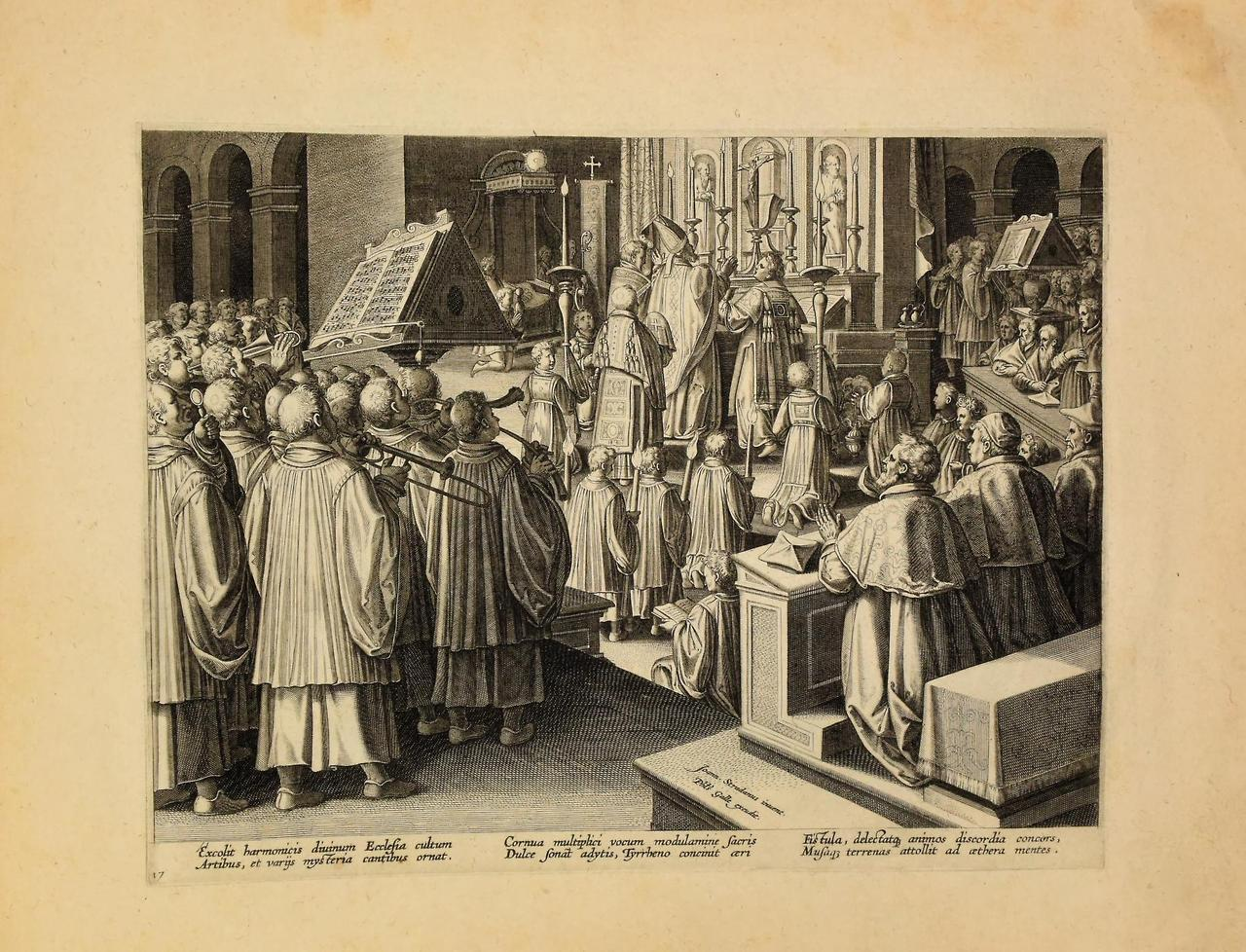
Cornets and sackbuts used in liturgical setting, with choir.

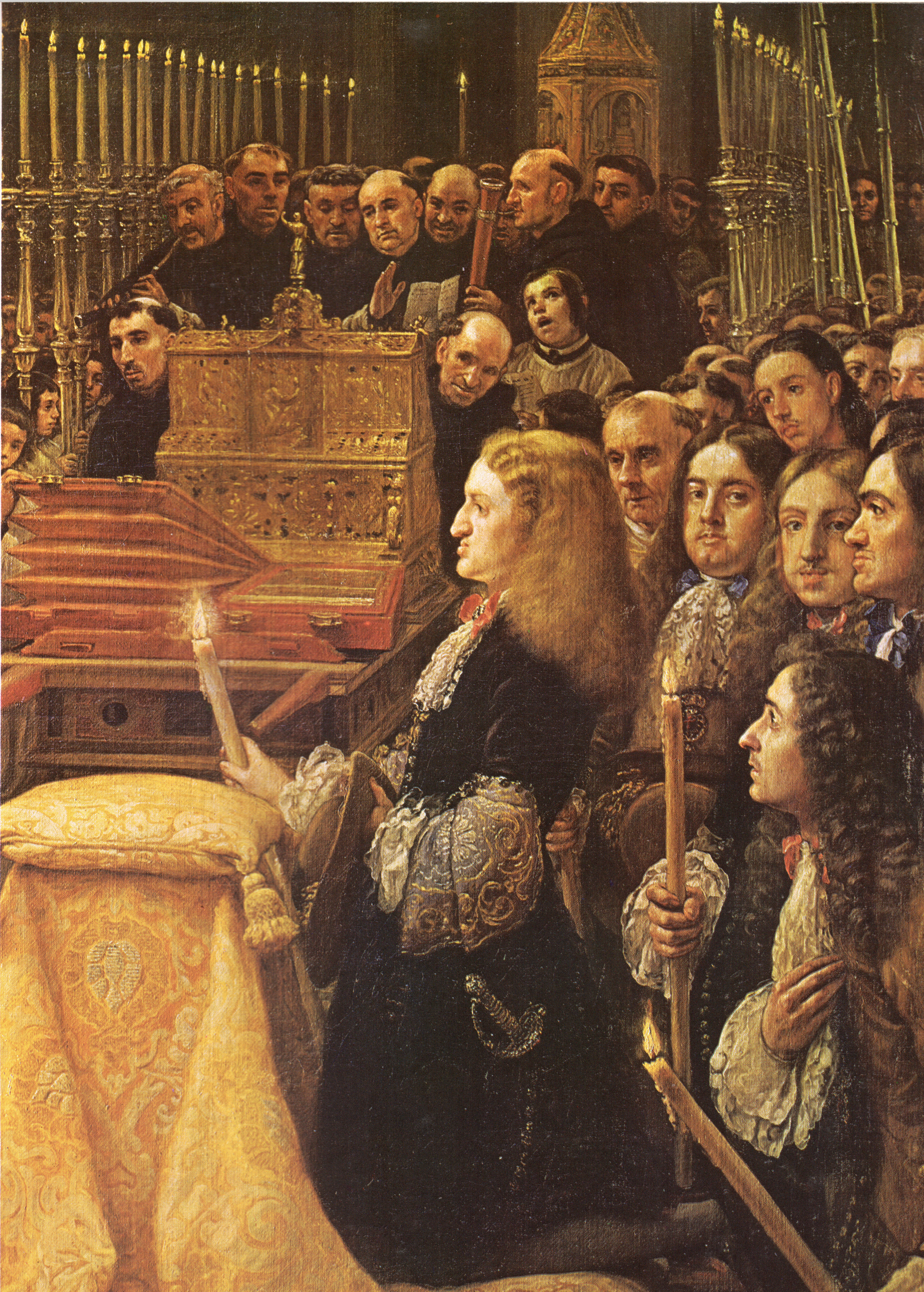
Scene in a Spanish church, detail of Charles II adores the Holy Eucharist

Like the serpent, another fingerhole horn that was paired with it, the cornett was used to reinforce the human voice, accompanying choral music. The cornett was deemed to be similar to the voice of a boy soprano, a part found in English liturgical music which the cornett accompanied. Not only English, for Mersenne speaks of the cornett being "heard with the choir voices in the cathedrals or chapels."

Historically, two cornetts were frequently used in consort with three sackbuts, often to double a church choir, into the 18th century. This was particularly popular in Venetian churches such as the Basilica San Marco, where extensive instrumental accompaniment was encouraged, particularly in use with antiphonal choirs.

== Playing the cornett ==
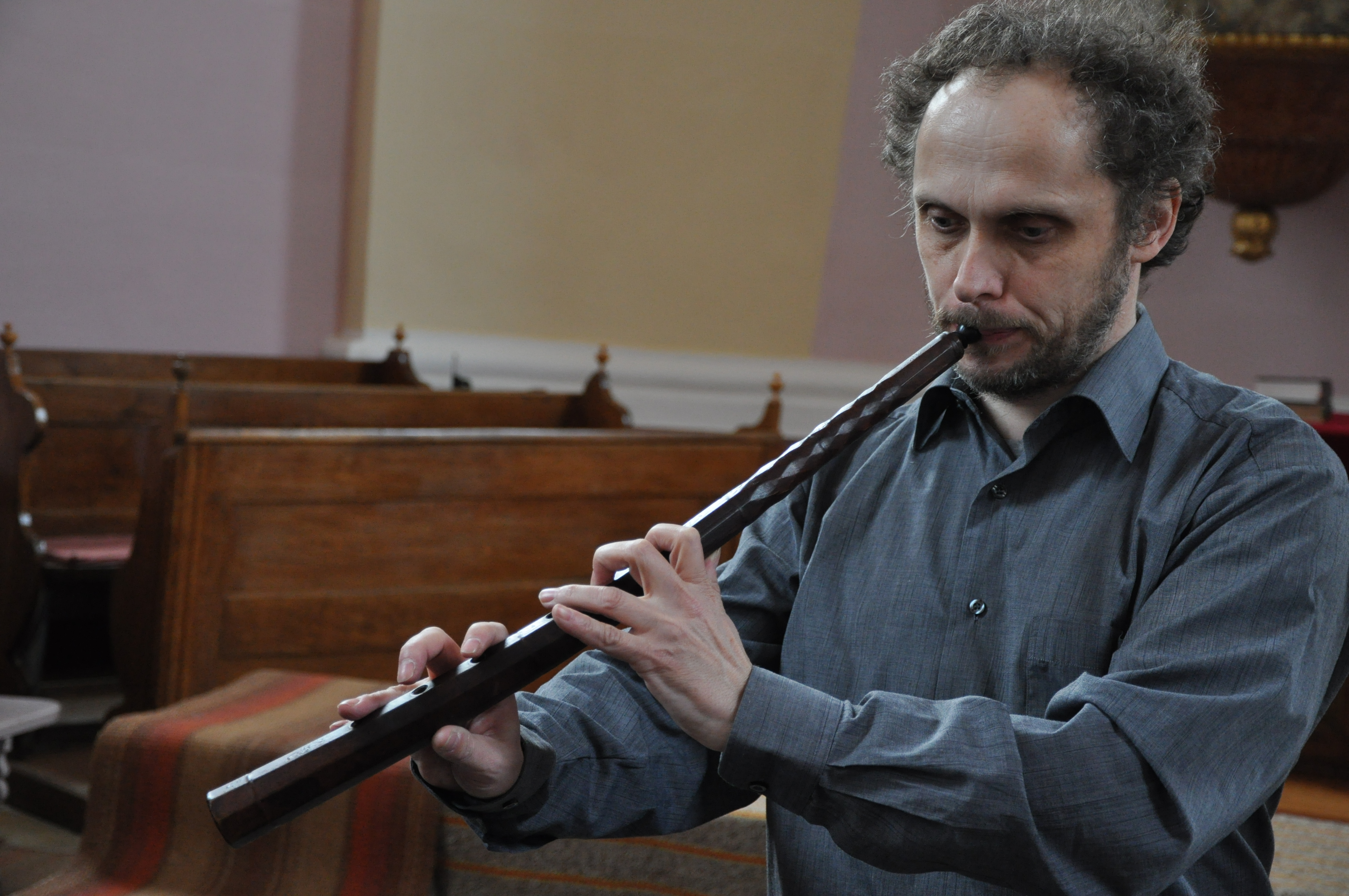
The cornetto, played by Ben Skála

The cornett's pitches are controlled using a combination of the player's lips and fingerholes. The lips change pitch through different tensions. The fingerholes alter the length of the sound column.

Cornetts are made with a mouthpiece, similar to that on brass instruments, but very small. Unlike the brass mouthpieces, players don't press the instrument to the center of their mouths, as on a trumpet. Rather the technique to produce sound is to hold the instrument to the side of the mouth, where the player's lips are thinner. Players stretch their lips to tighten them, with help from cheek muscles.

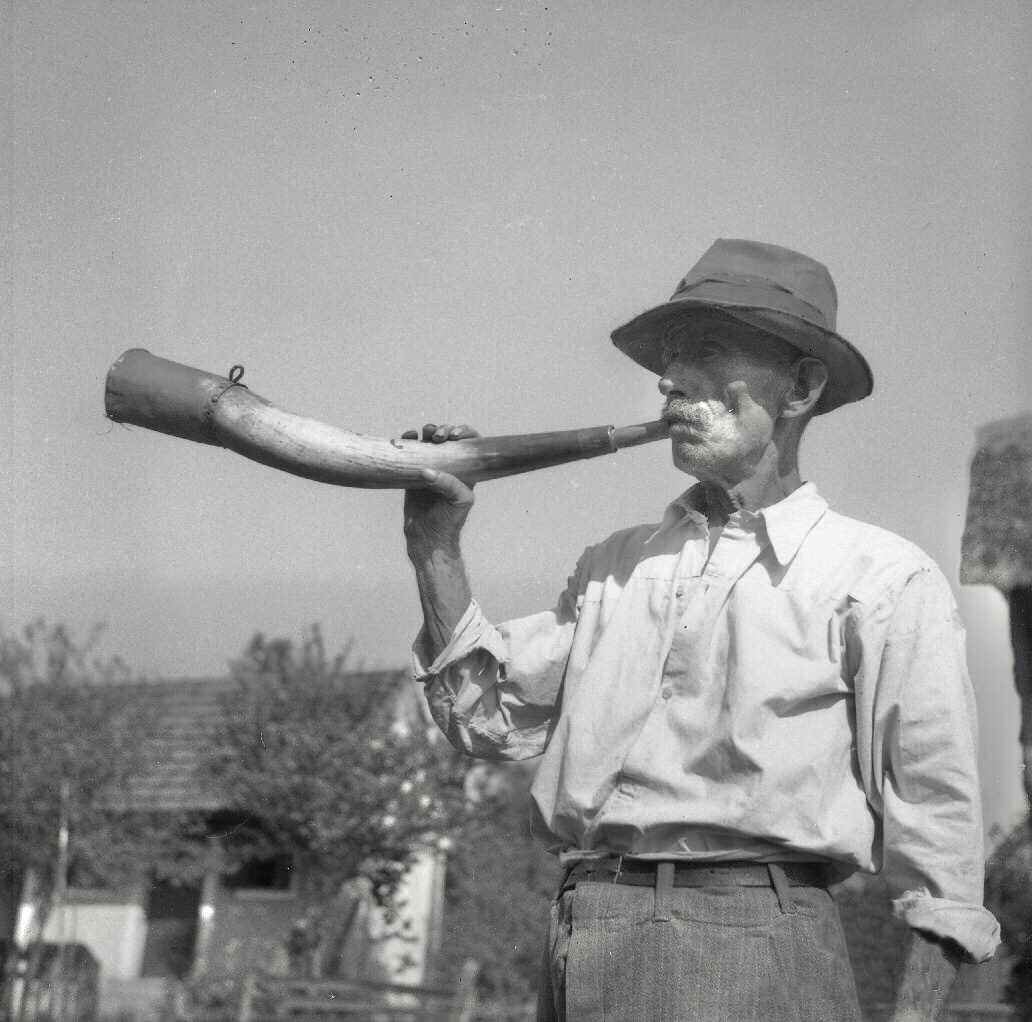
Slovak shepherd playing a cow's horn, the horn pressed to the side of his mouth.

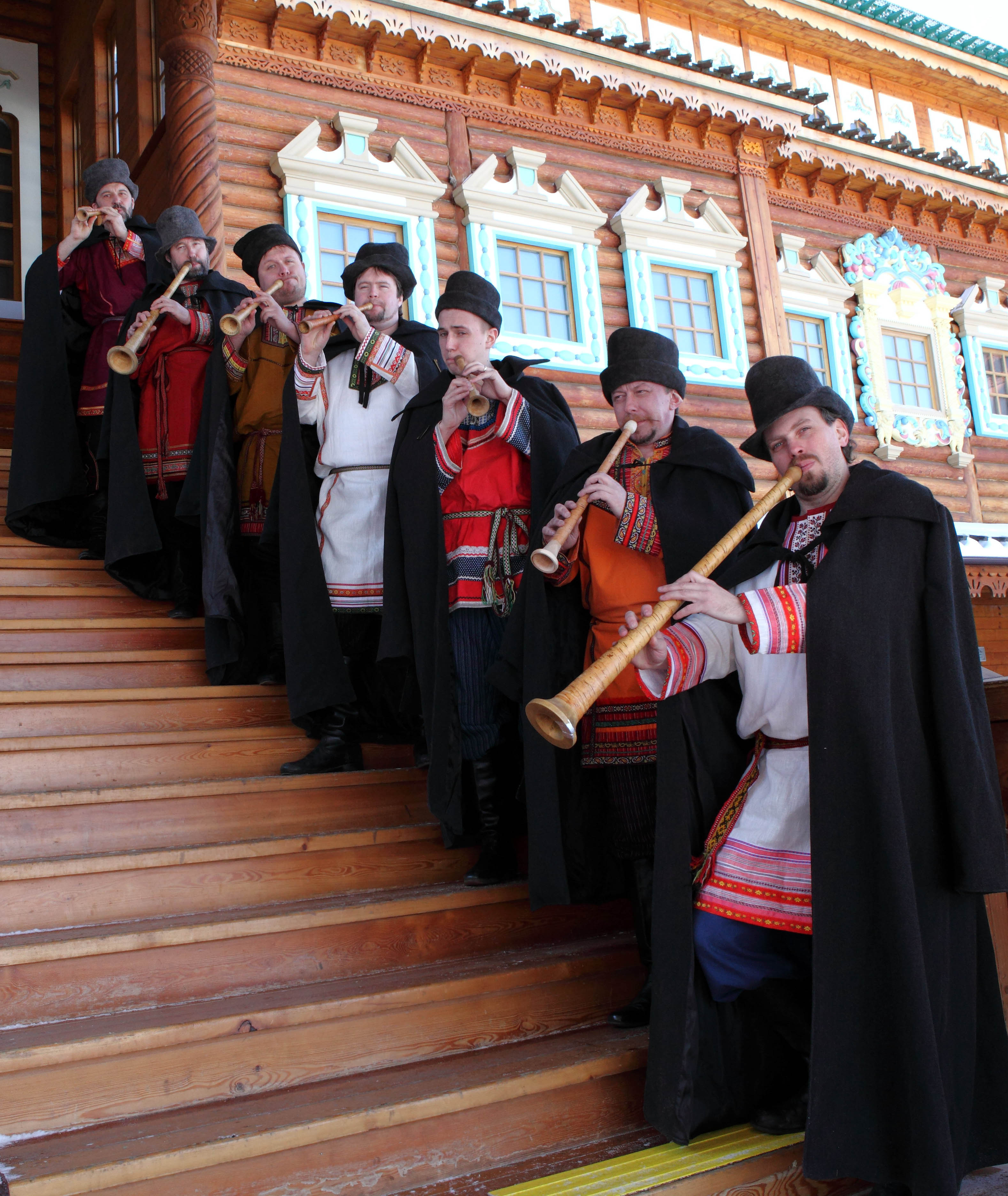
Russian rozhok horns, with fingerholes and played from the side of the mouth.

The technique is not unique to cornets, but has also been used for the traditional animal-horn horns, such as the shofur and Slovak shepherd's horn, as well as for folk horns such as the Russian rozhok.

Girolamo dalla Casa wrote about how the coronet should sound when played, and in doing so revealed other ways it could sound as well. He felt that the instrument was meant to imitate the human voice, saying, "The cornetto is the most excellent of the wind instruments since it imitates the human voice better than the other instruments." He warned that improperly played, it would sound "horn-like or muted."

To play it properly, he said that player's must focus on the tone (with lips not spread apart and loose, or too tight and shrill). He felt tonguing was important to the sound, with energy but not too aggressive. Finally he felt that divisions or diminutions should be used, but sparingly and well. He said that cornettists should focus on making their playing sound like the human voice.

=== Learning to play ===
Books with cornett instruction included Grund-richtiger Unterricht der Musicalischen Kunst (Fundamentally correct instruction in the musical arts) by Daniel Speer, 1697 and Museum Musicum Theoretico-Practicum (Museum of theoretical-practical music) by Joseph Friedrich Bernhard Caspar Majer, 1732. Books written for other instruments were also applicable to the cornett. Among these were Ganassi dal Fontego (Opera intitulata Fontegara, 1535) and Bismantova (Compendio musicale, 1677). These books covered the recorder, but the instructions on "tonguing" with "force and speed" has application to the cornett, which was pictured on the Fontegara title page illustration.

Besides tonguing, books taught students to improvise. Students learning cornet music were encouraged to play in the "diminutive", looking at sheet music and adapting it by creating runs of fast notes to replace long slow notes in written works.

The book (Il Vero Modo Di Diminuir, 1584) by cornett virtoso Girolamo Dalla Casa focused on tone, tonguing and divisions to make the cornett sound like the human voice.

== The cornett and historically informed performance ==
As a result of the recent historically informed performance movement the cornett has been rediscovered, and modern works for the instrument have been written.

== Bibliography ==
- Herbert, Trevor; Myers, Arnold; Wallace, John, eds. (2019). The Cambridge Encyclopedia of Brass Instruments. Cambridge University Press. doi:10.1017/9781316841273. ISBN 978-1-316-63185-0. OL 34730943M. Wikidata Q136027509.
- Jarratt-Knock, David (2014). The 'cornett': Diversity of form, function and usage as portrayed in organological and iconographical sources, c.1500–c.1800 (PDF) (MMus thesis). Birmingham University.
- Klaus, Sabine Katharina (2013). Ways to Expand the Harmonic Series. Trumpets and Other High Brass. Vol. 2. Vermillion: National Music Museum. ISBN 978-0-9848269-2-6. Wikidata Q116447957.
- Marcuse, Sibyl (1975). Musical Instruments: A Comprehensive Dictionary. New York: W. W. Norton & Company. ISBN 978-0-393-00758-9. LCCN 74030050. OCLC 924550493. OL 5064015M. Wikidata Q113270677.
