= Georg Poplutz =

German opera singer

- Born: Arnsberg, Germany
- Education: Musikhochschule Frankfurt; Musikhochschule Köln
- Occupation: Classical tenor
- Organizations: Johann Rosenmüller Ensemble; Cantus Cölln
- Website: www.georgpoplutz.de

Georg Poplutz is a German tenor, a soloist in Baroque music, opera and oratorio, and a Lied singer. He has been a member of vocal ensembles such as Johann Rosenmüller Ensemble and Cantus Cölln, and has participated in projects to record the complete works of Heinrich Schütz and Christoph Graupner.

== Career ==
Poplutz was born in Arnsberg. He studied pedagogy for English and Music at the Münster University and the Dortmund University. He studied voice with Berthold Possemeyer at the Musikhochschule Frankfurt. After further studies with Christoph Prégardien at the Musikhochschule Köln, he graduated in 2007 with the concert exam.

Poplutz made his operatic debut at the Theater Gießen in 2004, in Monteverdi's L'incoronazione di Poppea. In 2005 he recorded the part of Balouard in Étienne Méhul's opera L'irato, conducted by Werner Ehrhardt). In the field of historically informed performance, Poplutz has collaborated as a soloist with conductors such as Marcus Creed, Helmut Müller-Brühl, Peter Neumann (de), Ralf Otto, Wolfgang Schäfer and Winfried Toll. In 2005, he sang tenor parts in Bach cantatas with Martin Lutz conducting performances in services in the Marktkirche in Wiesbaden and the Katharinenkirche in Frankfurt, documented in a recording of Du Hirte Israel, höre, BWV 104. He was awarded the Mendelssohn-Preis of the Frankfurt Mendelssohn-Gesellschaft, founded by Paulus Christmann, in 2009, and performed the tenor solo part in the composer's oratorio Elias with the Frankfurter Singakademie, conducted by Christmann, in the Alte Oper. With them, he was in 2011 a soloist in Paulus, along with Elisabeth Scholl and conducted by Mathias Breitschaft. In 2013, he recorded the part of the Evangelist in Bach's Christmas Oratorio (parts 4 to 6) with the Kantorei Barmen-Gemarke, conducted by Wolfgang Kläsener. He sang the tenor solo in Bach's Mass in B minor in St. Martin, Idstein, with the orchestra L'arpa festante conducted by Franz Fink. In 2014, he performed cantatas by Georg Philipp Telemann with the Rheinische Kantorei, conducted by Hermann Max, at festivals such as the Magdeburger Telemann-Festtage.

Poplutz has been a member of the vocal ensembles Johann Rosenmüller Ensemble, conducted by Arno Paduch, which performed for example in 2012 the first performance after 250 years of the Missa solemnis by Joseph Schmitt in Eberbach Abbey, where he had worked, as part of the Rheingau Musik Festival. Poplutz has been a member of the ensemble Cantus Cölln, conducted by Konrad Junghänel. He has appeared as a soloist with the Dresdner Kammerchor, conducted by Hans-Christoph Rademann, in the complete recording of the works by Heinrich Schütz. A reviewer noted about the eight soloists performing Kleine geistliche Konzerte 1 (Little Sacred Concertos): "Whether solo, duo or in other combinations the voices are finely scaled, appropriately clear, purely focused and idiomatic".

As a recitalist of Lieder, especially of romantic songs, Poplutz has collaborated with pianist Hilko Dumno. A review of a concert of Schubert's Winterreise noted, that the singer, with an absolutely secure voice and attention to diction, created an intense atmosphere full of tension ("eine dichte, spannungsvolle Atmosphäre"), an "entire cosmos of emotions".
