= Roland Wilson (conductor) =

Roland Wilson (born 1956 in Leeds, West Yorkshire, England) is a British cornett player, and conductor based in Germany.

Roland Wilson originally studied trumpet at the Royal College of Music, London, specializing in the baroque cornett. After moving to Germany, he worked as a soloist for other ensembles, for example alongside fellow cornettist Bruce Dickey, in the March 1985 recording of the Heinrich Schütz Opus Ultimum with the Hilliard Ensemble and Knabenchor Hannover for EMI.

In 1976, he founded Musica Fiata, an ensemble specialising in baroque wind music. Musica Fiata's first major recordings were supporting Kammerchor Stuttgart conducted by Frieder Bernius in Heinrich Schütz Symphoniae Sacrae III, Christmas and Resurrection oratorios and Psalmen Davids, and Monteverdi's Vespro della Beata Vergine from 1989-1991. The Wilson expanded Musica Fiata to include La Capella Ducale, a choir. Musica Fiata has recorded for DHM, Sony Vivarte, Glissando and CPO.

Wilson is not the only cornettist to have founded his own ensemble, Jean Tubéry directs La Fenice, Arno Paduch directs the Johann Rosenmüller Ensemble, Bruce Dickey and trombonist Charles Toet direct Concerto Palatino.

Wilson regularly speaks at symposia and writes on early wind instrument construction, performance practice, and historical pitch.

== See also ==
- Tenor cornett
