= Mute cornett =

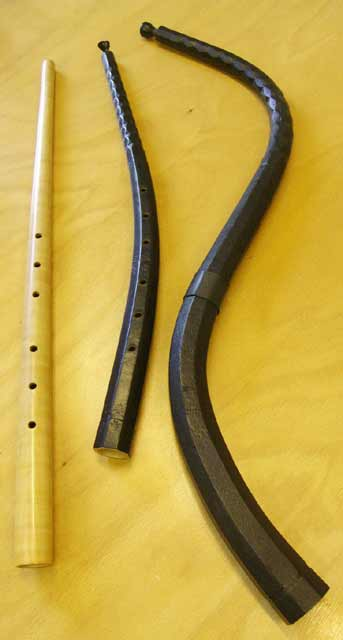
Three different cornetts: the mute, curved cornett and tenor cornett (left to right)

The mute cornett was an important variant of the treble cornett and it was used in compositions by European composers in the 16th, 17th and 18th centuries. A significant number of mute cornetts have survived and are preserved in various European museums. Modern makers of cornetts produce mute cornetts and the numbers of recordings of music featuring this instrument has increased in recent years.

== Construction ==
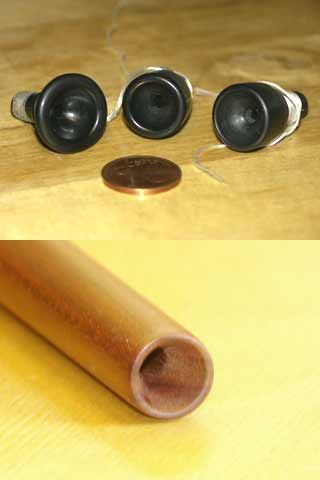
Detachable mouthpieces from a regular cornett, and the integrated mouthpiece of a mute cornett

Unlike the regular curved cornett, cornettino and tenor cornett, the mute cornett is made from a single piece of wood that has been turned on a lathe, bored out and given finger holes. The non-detachable mouthpiece forms a smooth cup shape at the top. The cross section of the mouthpiece shows that it is similar in structure to that of a French horn. It eliminates the slight brassiness of the regular cornett and imparts the characteristic timbre associated with the instrument. Unlike other forms of cornett, mute cornetts were not covered in leather.

== History ==
Like all cornetts, the mute cornett was developed from the medieval cow horn with finger holes. The mute cornett seems to have come into prominence in the 16th century, although it certainly existed in the 15th century. Lists of instrumentations in performances of music, particularly the Florentine Intermedii, sometimes mention the use of mute cornetts. Lassus conducted performances of instrumental and vocal music in Munich, and descriptions of these concerts mention the use of mute cornetts. A painting of Lassus directing his musicians and singers shows both a regular cornett and a mute cornett. Mute cornetts were produced by makers in Venice in the 16th century and these instruments seem to have been exported to various cities in Europe.

The mute cornett was popular in Italy around 1600, although the instrument was rarely specifically named by composers in their works. In Northern Europe, composers were more precise, and the mute cornett was specified by 17th-century composers such as Heinrich Schütz, Michael Praetorius and Johann Heinrich Schmelzer. In the early 18th century, the mute cornett seem to be becoming an increasingly rare instrument, however, Johann Joseph Fux composed a Requiem in 1720 which specified two mute cornetts.

== Tessitura ==
Mute cornetts were generally built in A or G, the same as treble cornetts. (A treble "cornett in A" means that the lowest note, all holes closed and the fundamental sounded, is A below middle C.) Most music for the mute cornett seems to have been written in the C1, C2, or C3 (soprano, mezzo-soprano, or alto) clefs and is generally of a slightly lower tessitura than that of the regular treble cornett. However, the mute cornett is a genuine soprano instrument and one of its primary functions appears to have been playing colla parte with the soprano voices of vocal choirs.

== Pitch ==
Like all the members of the cornett family, mute cornetts were generally pitched around A = 466 Hz, the so-called Chor-ton or Kornett-ton pitch, which was about one tone higher than the common pitch of other string and wind instruments in the 17th and 18th centuries.

== Timbre ==
Praetorius described the sound of the mute cornett as Still und lieblich (soft and lovely) and modern professional performers have amply demonstrated these qualities. The sound of the mute cornett is more flute-like than the regular cornett and far less incisive. The mute cornett's piano is very soft indeed and it may be used in consorts of soft instruments like recorders, flutes, viols and lutes. In Michael Praetorius's Polyhymnia caduceatrix et panegyrica of 1619, three mute cornetts are specified in "Choir I" of the motet, "Erhalt uns Herr bei deinen Wort", however, Praetorius suggests that the mute cornetts may be replaced by transverse flutes (i.e. "Fiffari").

== Variants ==
Two specimens of mute cornettino have survived, however, it seems that such instruments were very rare.

== Nomenclature ==
The mute cornett is known as the cornetto muto or cornetto sordino in Italian, stiller Zink in German and cornet muet or cornet sourdine.
