= Johann Rosenmüller Ensemble =

German early music group

The Johann Rosenmüller Ensemble is a German early music group formed by the German cornetto player and conductor Arno Paduch in 1995. The group's performance and discography focuses on the rediscovery of unknown music of the 17th and 18th centuries.

== Discography ==
- 2000 - Johann Rosenmüller: Deutsche Geistliche Konzerte. Christophorus CHR 77227.
- 2001 - Johann Caspar Kerll: Missa in fletu solatium obsidionis Viennensis. Christophorus CHR 77249.
- 2002 - Albrecht von Brandenburg und die Reformation. Christophorus CHR 77254.
- 2003 - Johann Pachelbel: Geistliche Festmusik. Christophorus CHR 77257.
- 2005 - Sebastian Knüpfer - Thomaskantor: Geistliche Konzerte. Christophorus CHR 77276.
- 2005 - Andreas Hammerschmidt: Geistliche Vokalmusik. Rondeau Production ROP 7001.
- 2006 - Coronatio Solemnissima – Die Krönung Kaiser Leopold I. (1658). Works by Antonio Bertali, Johann Heinrich Schmelzer et al. Christophorus CHR 77283.
- 2009 - Michael Praetorius: Michaelisvesper. Rondeau Production ROP 7007.
- 2010 - Johann Rosenmüller: Venezianische Abendmusik. Christophorus CHR 77333.
- 2012 - Festive Music for the Reformation Celebration in 1617. Works by Michael Altenburg, Heinrich Schütz, Samuel Scheidt et al. Christophorus CHR 77363.
