= Arno Paduch =

Arno Paduch (* 1965 Hattersheim am Main, Germany) is a German cornetto player, conductor and musicologist.

After highschool degree in Friedberg (Germany), Paduch studied musicology at Goethe University Frankfurt (Germany) and afterwards cornetto and historic performance practice at Schola Cantorum Basiliensis in Basle (Switzerland). Still being a student, in 1992 he received a teaching assignment for cornetto and ensemble playing at the early music division of University of Music and Theatre Leipzig which he has been keeping until today. In 1995 Paduch founded the Johann Rosenmüller Ensemble Leipzig, specialised on music of the 17th and 18th centuries.

As a conductor and cornetto player, he gave acclaimed concerts on several places and early music festivals all around Germany and Europe.
