= Musica Fiata =

Musica Fiata, also Musica Fiata Köln, is a German instrumental ensemble, founded in Cologne in 1976 by director Roland Wilson. According to AllMusic it is "appreciated for its dynamic vivacity, virtuosic precision, and the historical accuracy of its performance practices." The group has collaborated with La Capella Ducale on numerous occasions and has a reputation for performing Renaissance works and Baroque wind music.
