= List of polytonal pieces =

List of pieces using polytonality and/or bitonality.

- Samuel Barber
  - Symphony No. 2 (1944)
- Béla Bartók
  - Mikrokosmos Volume 5 number 125: The opening (mm. 1-76) of "Boating", (actually bimodality) in which the right hand uses pitches of E♭ dorian and the left hand uses those of either G mixolydian or dorian
  - Mikrokosmos No. 105, "Playsong"
  - Bagatelles (1908) 1st Bagatelle, RH: C♯ minor, LH: C Phrygian.
- Jeff Beal
  - Theme from House of Cards
- Heinrich Biber
  - Battalia à 10 (1673)
- Benjamin Britten
  - Sea Interludes (1945)
  - Fanfare for St Edmundsbury (1959)
  - Folk Songs of the British Isles, Vol. 1, No. 6
- Vicente García
  - San Bá
- Alberto Ginastera
  - Danzas Argentinas - 1. "Danza del viejo boyero" (1937), RH: white keys, LH: black keys
- Philip Glass
  - Symphony No. 2, used for ambiguity
- Jerry Goldsmith
  - Planet of the Apes (1968)
  - Patton (1970)
  - The Omen (1976)
- Percy Grainger
  - Lincolnshire Posy
- Gustav Holst
  - The Planets (Neptune)
  - Terzetto for flute, oboe and viola
- Arthur Honegger
  - Symphony for Strings, III
- Bruce Hornsby
  - "What The Hell Happened" (from Halcyon Days, 2004)
- Charles Ives
  - Variations on "America" (1891-1892), polytonal interludes added 1909-1910
  - Adeste fidelis for organ (1897)
  - Sixty-seventh Psalm (1898–99)
  - Piano Sonata No. 2 (Ives) III. The Alcotts, presence of bitonality (right hand in B♭ major and left hand in A♭ major)
- Captain Beefheart
  - Frownland, from Trout Mask Replica (1969)
  - Hair Pie: Bake Two, from Trout Mask Replica (1969)
  - Petrified Forest, from Lick My Decals Off, Baby (1970)
  - Making Love to a Vampire with a Monkey on My Knee, from Doc At The Radar Station (1980)
- John Kander
  - Cabaret (1966), in the Finale Ultimo
- Colin McPhee
  - Concerto for Piano, with Wind Octette Acc. (1928)
- Darius Milhaud
  - Scaramouche, in the first movement "Vif"
  - Sorocaba, from Saudades Do Brasil
  - Le Boeuf sur le toit
  - String Quartet No.5 (1920)
- Ennio Morricone
  - The Untouchables (1987)
- Wolfgang Amadeus Mozart
  - Ein musikalischer Spass

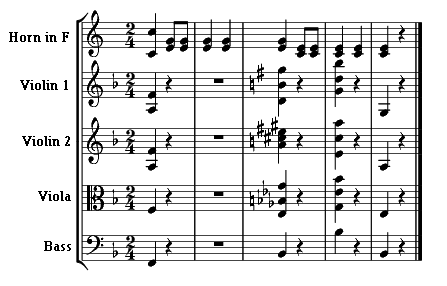
Ein musikalischer Spass

- Sergei Prokofiev
  - Lieutenant Kijé Suite (mov. V, "The Burial of Kijé")
  - Sarcasms, Op. 17. The third movement uses two different key signatures for each hand.
  - Symphony No. 3
- Alfred Reed
  - A Festival Prelude
- Julius Röntgen
  - Symphony No. 9 "The Bitonal" (Sept 8, 1930)
- Arnold Schoenberg
  - "Gavotte", Suite for Piano Op. 25 (1923)
- William Schuman
  - George Washington Bridge
- Igor Stravinsky
  - Petrushka, opening fanfare
  - Symphony of Psalms - 3rd Movement
  - Symphonies of Wind Instruments (1947), rehearsal No. 11
  - "Rite of Spring"
- Karol Szymanowski
  - String Quartet No. 1 in C major Movement 3 (1917). Each part has its own key: Cello, C; Viola, 3 flats; Violin 2, 6 sharps; Violin 1, 3 sharps. See score.
- Jeff Wayne
  - The War of the Worlds - "The Red Weed (Parts 1 & 2)" (B and G major)

- John Williams
  - Star Wars (1977)
  - Jaws (1975)
- John Zdechlik
  - Chorale and Shaker Dance
