= Francisco Valls =

Francisco Valls or Francesc Valls (Barcelona 1665/1671 – 2 February 1747) was a Spanish composer, theorist and mestre de capella. Among his most known works are the mass Missa Scala Aretina and tract Mapa Armónico Práctico.

== Life ==
In 1696 Francisco Valls left the Church of Santa Maria del Mar, Barcelona, and took up the post of Mestre de capella at Barcelona Cathedral. He wrote 10 masses, 17 psalm settings, 30 motets, several other sacred items and 141 secular compositions. Many of these are manuscripts lodged in the Biblioteca de Catalunya in Barcelona.

== Composition of the Missa Scala Aretina ==
The Missa Scala Aretina, so called in reference to Guido Aretinus' scale that appears in the cantus firmus (prominently audible in the Kyrie), caused a major musical controversy between 1715 and 1720, initiated by a pamphlet against Valls by the organist and theatre composer Joaquín Martínez de la Roca. Pro and anti groups were roughly equal, the famous composer Alessandro Scarlatti had given an opinion, mildly opposed to Valls' ideas. In the Qui tollis at bar 120 (López-Calo edition) the second soprano enters on an unprepared 9th chord causing a gratuitous semitonal dissonance with a b flat, a, f, d and low g sounding simultaneously on the words miserere nobis. The unpreparedness of the entry rather than the discord is the problem. It is doubtful whether such a chord would have been criticized in England where the dissonant music of Henry Purcell or William Lawes had been admired at court and church. Many of Valls' other works, however, use harmony which was highly unconventional at the time (see below).

The original singing parts of the Missa Scala Aretina are well worn and often turned, suggesting that the Missa was performed many times.

The Missa Scala Aretina is scored for 3 vocal choirs, (SAT) (soloists), (SSAT) (soloists) and the choir (SATB). Instruments are 2 oboes doubling 2 violins, 2 trumpets and violone (cello?). Choir I has harp continuo, choirs II and III separate organs, each with a doubling violone or bassoon.

The Missa Scala Aretina is a typical baroque piece, sounding reminiscent of Biber's Missa Salisburgensis but also looking back to Italian Colossal Baroque music. The Kyrie is sumptuous but diatonic with strong trumpet lines. Aching suspensions are not long in arriving however when the text requires them, such as the mysterious et incarnatus. Like Biber's mass the Credo is highly coloured, with descendit being a descending scale and coelis ascending. The Crucifixus begins in D-major but sinks a tone to a C-minor tierce de Picardie cadence. This is answered by an A-major resurrexit.

== Treatise Mapa Armónico Práctico ==
In retirement Valls wrote a treatise on harmonic theory, Mapa Armónico Práctico. A facsimile of the manuscript was published in 2002. It contains an exposition of the author's views on musical theory and practice and a large number of musical examples from his works. All the vocal music by Valls from Mapa Armónico Prácticoand a few instrumental pieces have been transcribed and are in the public domain. See links below.

The Latin choral works in the Mapa are of particular interest. They include 4 solo sacred arias, one duet, a series of sacred canons, motets and movements from the Mass (including the Christe Eleison from the Missa Scala Aretina) and from the Te Deum. Some of these works are polychoral and/or have more or less full accompaniment. Many of the works use highly unconventional (for the time) musical techniques. Examples with particularly interesting use of dissonance include Valls' motets, Domine vim patior, Cor mundum meum and O vos omnes.

There are a number of accompanied pieces. These include the 10 part In te Domine speravi with full orchestral accompaniment including an opening trumpet fanfare and a movement, Cum sancto spiritu, from an unidentified mass.

Valls' sacred choral works (both Latin and Spanish) frequently focus on the Virgin Mary. These works include his best known motet, Tota pulchra es (not included in the Mapa) which was the only work, apart from the Missa Scala Aretina, to be performed regularly in the centuries following his death. There are also a number of canons, motets and villancicos in the Mapa on the same subject.

The sacred works in Spanish from the Mapa come in two distinct categories. First there are a series of 4 part villancicos (or extracts). These are less adventurous in musical technique than the Latin works. Secondly there are some more ambitious complete villancicos in 8 or 12 parts. These include Quien será decid and Al combite que Amor hoy previene. The lyrics of these villancicos are mostly quite obscure.

Valls appears to have had an interest in medieval philosophers. His works include a setting of Saint Thomas Aquinas' hymn O memoriale mortis. He also composed a rather overblown 8 part ode to that saint in Spanish with full orchestral accompaniment. More impressive is his three part motet setting of the prayer by Saint Augustine of Hippo O sacramentum pietatis (from the latter's Tractates on the gospel of John). In this motet Valls uses variations in rhythm, time signatures and dynamics to express the changing mood of the text.

The Mapa includes two operatic works in Italian style, one of these is for chorus. One is a mournful tenor aria apparently composed for the character of Mark Antony in Egypt.

The instrumental works in the Mapa include fugues, "trocados" (works using contrary motion) and cancrizans canons. There is a composition for strings which uses what Valls calls the "enharmonic sharp", but which seems different from the orthodox conception of that expression. Valls' enharmonic sharp appears to raise the notes A, C, D, F and G by three quarters of a tone and the notes B and E by a quarter tone.

== Editions and modern performances ==
- Francisco Valls, Missa Scala Aretina, edited by José López-Calo, (Novello, 1975). (From Ms. M. 1489, Biblioteca de Catalunya, Barcelona.).

The first performance of the Missa Scala Aretina in modern times in Barcelona was given by an English choir, the London Oratory Choir at the International Music Festival as late as 1978.

There are many other compositions by Valls surviving in the archives of the Biblioteca de Catalunya in Barcelona and elsewhere. Most of them are unedited, but critical editions of some of the works are available from Dinsic Publicacions Musicals. Others works are available from Scalaaretina, the Choral Public Domain Library, Musica de Hispania and the Werner Icking Music Archive. (see links below).

== Selected discography ==
- "con afecto" Works from Mapa Armónico Práctico 1742 by Francesc Valls, Ensemble BachWerkVokal, Gordon Safari, MDG 923 2368-6, www.mdg.de
- Valls: Missa Scala Aretina; dir. John Hoban, The London Oratory Choir, CRD, 3371 1994
- Valls: Missa Scala Aretina; Heinrich Biber: Requiem, dir. Gustav Leonhardt, Netherlands Bach Society Chorus, DHM.
- Tonos divinos A todo correr; Pues oy benignas las Luzes; Quando Antonio glorioso; Sagrado portento de amor; Que estruendo de clarines; Espiritu ardiente en llamas; La que en el jardin serafico. A Corte Musical, dir. Rogerio Goncalves. PAN 2004
