= A Musical Joke =

1787 composition by W. A. Mozart

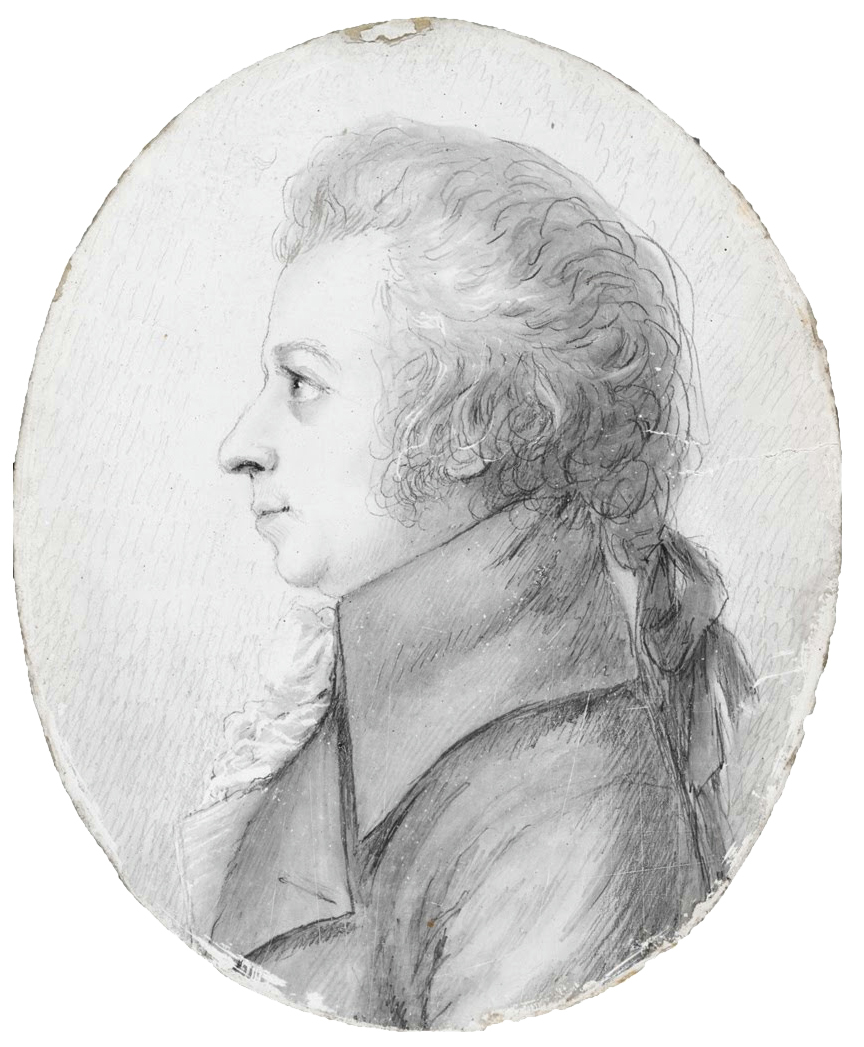
Miniature of Mozart by Dora Stock (1789)

A Musical Joke (German: Ein musikalischer Spaß, lit. 'A Musical Fun') K. 522, (divertimento for two horns in F, and string quartet) is a composition by Wolfgang Amadeus Mozart; he entered it in his Verzeichnis aller meiner Werke (Catalogue of All My Works) on 14 June 1787.

Many commentators have expressed the opinion that the piece's purpose is satirical – that "[its] harmonic and rhythmic gaffes serve to parody the work of incompetent composers".

Mozart himself, however, is not known to have revealed his actual intentions.

== English name ==
The translated title A Musical Joke might be a poor rendering of the German original: Spaß does not necessarily connote the jocular, for which the words Scherz or Witz would more likely be used. A more accurate translation would be Some Musical Fun.

The sometimes-mentioned nicknames Dorfmusikantensextett ("village musicians' sextet") and Bauernsinfonie ("farmers' symphony") were added after Mozart's death; these names ridicule the players more than inept composers.

== Structure and compositional elements ==
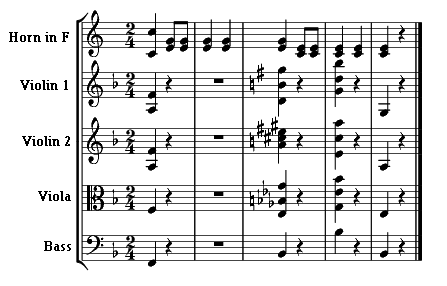
Mozart's exercise in polytonality, last five bars of the work

Synthesized version of the first movement

The piece consists of four movements that take about 20 minutes in total to perform.

1. Allegro (sonata form), F major
2. Menuetto and trio, F major (trio in B♭ major)
3. Adagio cantabile, C major
4. Presto (sonata rondo form), F major

Compositorial comedic devices include:

- secondary dominants replacing necessary subdominant chords;
- dissonance in the horns;
- parallel fifths
- whole-tone scales in the violin's high register;
- clumsy orchestration, backing a thin melodic line with a heavy, monotonous accompaniment in the last movement;
- going to the wrong keys for a sonata-form structure (the first movement, for example, never succeeds in modulating to the dominant, and simply jumps there instead after a few failed attempts);
- starting the slow movement in the wrong key (G major instead of C major);
- a pathetic attempt at a fugato, also in the last movement.

The piece is notable for one of the earliest known uses of polytonality (although not the earliest, having been predated by Heinrich Ignaz Franz Biber's Battalia), creating the gesture of complete collapse at the end of the finale. This might be intended to produce the impression of grossly out-of-tune string playing, since the horns alone conclude in the tonic key. The lower strings behave as if the tonic has become B♭, while the violins and violas switch to G major, A major and E♭ major, respectively.

== In popular culture ==
The beginning of the fourth movement is used as the theme to the BBC's television coverage of the Horse of the Year Show.
