= Colossal Baroque =

The Colossal Baroque style is a name which has been coined to describe a number of musical compositions from the 17th and 18th centuries composed in an opulent, magnificent and large-scaled style. Such works frequently make use of polychoral techniques and often feature instrumental forces considerably larger than the norm for the Baroque period. The Colossal Baroque had its roots in Italy, in the resplendent multiple polychoral music of the Venetian School, in the sumptuous, extravagant productions of the Medici court, for example the 40- and 60-voice Missa sopra Ecco sì beato giorno by Alessandro Striggio, and in the large polychoral works of the Roman School, many of which were written long after the Venetian School had vanished. An impetus for this music was the Council of Trent, which marked the beginning of the Counter-Reformation. Some attendees of the Council held the unofficial point of view that music should be subservient to text, as idealized and exemplified in the choral music of Palestrina. Some critics held that this was not as achievable in larger choral textures.

== Background ==
Some of the roots of the Colossal Baroque style were in the opulent Florentine Intermedii of the 16th century, commissioned and attended by the powerful Medici family. La Pellegrina, performed for the wedding of Ferdinand de' Medici to the French princess, Christine of Lorraine, in 1589, featured music for up to seven choirs, by Cristofano Malvezzi in Intermedio VI.

Yet another city that cultivated large sonorities was Rome. Composers there were not as adventurous with harmony and rhythm as the Venetians, but they had spacious churches with elaborate interiors which demanded music to match. Composers such as Orazio Benevoli, who began his career in Rome, helped spread the style elsewhere, especially across the Brenner Pass into the Austrian lands.

In the Austrian area, multi-part pieces were written for special occasions but not always published. There is a long list of missing and incomplete works by Giovanni Valentini, (some in 17 choirs), Priuli, Bernadi, (the mass for consecration of Salzburg Cathedral used 16 choirs), and others. Some of Valentini's trumpet parts survive; they have few changes of note, and many rests. It is possible that the brass may have made dovetailed mass volume answering phrases in a multi-choir texture similar to the effects exploited by Giovanni Gabrieli and the other composers of the Venetian School.

Pieces were typically in 12 or more parts but there is evidence that the polychoral aspects did not always involve wide spacing. For example, in Ugolini's Exultate Omnes there are trio passages for all the sopranos, tenors and altos from each choir together. This would have been impractical if the singers were widely separated, due to the physical limitation imposed by the speed of sound. On the other hand, some pieces were very likely to have been performed with singers and players distributed widely, in venues such as Salzburg Cathedral; for maximum effect and practicality, much of this music was antiphonal or exploited echo effects.

Orazio Benevoli became confused with Heinrich Biber and Stefano Bernardi in the celebrated mixup over the authorship of the Missa Salisburgensis, now assigned to Biber and provisionally dated to 1682.

Works we may consider to be examples of the Colossal Baroque style were frequently ceremonial works, composed for special occasions (coronations, weddings, religious festivals, municipal functions, victory celebrations, et cetera). These works were frequently performed with unusually large musical forces. From time to time the scores of such works may have been presented to the aristocrat hosting or the subject of the event. As a result, many scores of large-scale 16th- and 17th-century works have been lost. Heinrich Schütz composed a musical setting of Psalm 136, Danket dem Herren, denn er ist freundlich which included three vocal choirs, 12 cornetti and 18 trumpets. This score is also now lost.

== Some composers ==
Composers of the 17th century who composed works in the colossal style include:

- Orazio Benevoli (1605–1672)
- Heinrich Ignaz Franz von Biber (1644–1704)
- Dietrich Buxtehude
- Marc-Antoine Charpentier
- Giovanni Gabrieli
- Stefano Landi
- Heinrich Schütz
- Joannes Baptista Dolar
- Johann Joseph Fux
- Andreas Hofer
- Jean-Baptiste Lully
- Vincenzo Ugolini (c. 1580 – 1638)

== Works which may be considered to be in the "Colossal Baroque" style ==
- Giovanni Gabrieli: Sonata XX à 22
- Giovanni Gabrieli: Magnificat à 33 voci
- Michael Praetorius: In Dulci Jubilo à 12, 16, & 20 cum Tubis
- Stefano Landi: Missa à 12 chori (music lost)
- Heinrich Schütz: SWV 476 - Domini est terra (this work features two vocal choirs, 2 cornettini, 5 dulcians, 2 violins, 4 trombones)
- Heinrich Ignaz Franz von Biber: Missa Salisburgensis à 53 voci
- Jean-Baptiste Lully: Te Deum (Lully conducted a performance with a choir of 300 singers and an orchestra of a similar size)
- Marc-Antoine Charpentier: Messe à quatre chœurs
- Dietrich Buxtehude: BuxWV 113 - Benedicam Dominum in omni tempore à 24 (this motet features six "choirs" of voices and instruments)
- Johann Joseph Fux: Costanza e Fortezza (the score for this opera features 8 trumpets, 2 timpanists and two complete orchestras)
- Johann Sebastian Bach: Passion after Matthew for solo voices, double choir and double orchestra

== Music editions ==
- Orazio Benevoli Opera Omnia, ed.
- L. Feininger, Monumenta liturgiae Polychoralis Sanctae Ecclesiae Romane (Rome, 1966-).
- Orazio Benevoli, Christe, a 12 in 3 choirs, ed.
- Marcel Couraud (Paris, Editions Salabert, 1973)
- Vincenzo Ugolini, Exultate omnes, Beata es Virgo Maria and Quae est ista, three motets in 12 part triple choirs. Transcribed and edited by Graham Dixon (Mapa Mundi, 1982).

== Books with Music ==
- Steven Saunders, CROSS, SWORD AND LYRE, Sacred Music at the Imperial Court of Ferdinand II of Habsburg (1619–1637) (Clarendon, 1995).
