= Arthur Stratton =

American writer (1911–1975)

The Great Red Island

Sinan the Architect

Arthur Mills Perce Stratton (1911 – 3 September 1975) was an American author and traveller. He was a playwright, a novelist, an OSS agent, a teacher in Turkey, and an assistant college professor in the US, before working for the CIA for about ten years and becoming a travel writer and biographer.

While serving with the American Field Service as a World War II ambulance driver, he was twice awarded the Croix de Guerre for bravery under fire, the first time on the Western Front, the second in North Africa.

== Early life ==
Stratton was born in Brunswick, Maine, the son of Arthur Mills Stratton (1868–1916), a native of Portsea Island, Portsmouth, England, a music hall performer known as 'Arthur Rudd', by his marriage to Frances Cora Perce, which took place on 16 October 1902 in Kimberley, in what was then the Cape Colony. His mother, a soprano, who had been born in Baltimore in 1873, lived until 1954. Stratton's father was said to be of a family "impeccably Church and Army", while his mother was described as "American as can be, which means English, Scottish, French and New York State Dutch". Stratton's mother, the daughter of Colonel LeGrand W. Perce, a lawyer practising at the Chicago Bar, was one of six children and was described as "One of the most promising young singers of Chicago... Miss Perce has a pure, even soprano voice, of great range, clear, sweet quality and of more than usual power."

Stratton was educated at Bowdoin College in his hometown and at Columbia University's Graduate School, Stratton graduated BS from Bowdoin in the class of 1935 and AM from Columbia.

== Life and career ==
In the 1930s, Stratton was a young playwright in New York, although without great success.

He was in France on the outbreak of the Second World War and joined the American Field Service as a volunteer. In 1940, as an ambulance driver in France, he was the first foreign volunteer to be decorated by the French Army during the war. The annual Report of the President of Bowdoin referred to the incident:

A Bowdoin graduate in the class of 1935, Mr. Arthur M. Stratton, was the first American to be decorated by the French government with the Croix de Guerre with Palms for bravery under fire... while serving with the American ambulance units on the Western Front.

He was to receive the Croix de Guerre twice. In late April 1942, while serving with the Free French Forces in the Eighth Army commanded by Montgomery, he was very severely wounded, more than ten times, while trying to evacuate wounded soldiers from the trap laid by the German Army at Bir Hakeim in the Libyan Desert and was incapacitated from further duty. His act was seen as a feat of exceptional courage and he received his second medal. Free France magazine reported that "A. M. P. Stratton of Brunswick, Maine was wounded in the right leg and left arm while attempting to salvage a partially demolished ambulance." The Columbia alumni news noted that "ARTHUR M. STRATTON, '42AM (Bowdoin)... was wounded at Bir Hacheim and was awarded the Croix de Guerre with Palms by the Free French."

At that time, Stratton was a close friend of the publisher Arnold Gingrich, whose magazine Coronet reported

The first ambulance ran into a storm of lead. The driver, George Tichenor, was killed instantly by a machine gun burst. His best friend, Arthur Stratton, like him a hero of the AFS in France, was in the ambulance behind Tichenor. Stratton's car, too, was struck by a machine gun burst and the steering mechanism destroyed. He hailed a truck and continued the perilous journey under tow. But he had advanced only a few hundred feet when a shell struck the front of his ambulance. Stratton, wounded in 11 places by machine gun fragments, helplessly watched his loaded ambulance destroyed by flames... Nothing is "out of bounds" to a bold AFS man.

In November 1942, Stratton returned to Bowdoin College to recover from his wounds. After his recovery, he was recruited as an agent of the Office of Strategic Services and moved to Turkey, where he taught English at Robert College in Istanbul.

In 1948, he was back in Brunswick as an assistant professor of English at Bowdoin College, based at 234 Maine Street. The same year, he published a novel called Lord Love Us. This was edited for Scribners by Burroughs Mitchell, a contemporary at Bowdoin.

Stratton then worked for the Central Intelligence Agency for some ten years. In the course of this work, he travelled widely, returning to Turkey often and also living in India, Indochina, and Madagascar.

His first major book was One Man's India (1955), while Madagascar was to inspire his second travel book, The Great Red Island (1964), a history of the country presented in the form of a biography weaving back and forth between the past and the present.

Stratton paid his second and last visit to Madagascar in 1958. His editor, Mitchell, later wrote of his travelling "to unlikely places like Madagascar, increasing his odd store of erudition". In 1964, he was living in Athens.

Reviewing his The Great Red Island in 1965, The Times said of him

Every now and then a figure stands out from the interminable ranks of travel writers. Arthur Stratton is such a one. Mr Stratton takes his time, at points too long a time, over bringing off his effects. An accomplished raconteur, rightly sure that he can hold his audience with the compelling magnetism of the Ancient Mariner, he does rather take advantage of his charm. Temptation to put in irrelevant facts (such as Louis XIV dying of gangrene) is not resisted.

In its review of The Great Red Island, The Spectator drew attention to Stratton's description of a southeastern stretch of the island as "Almost as lovely as the Attic coast" and noted that "Mr Stratton celebrates Madagascar. A New Englander who, as a volunteer with the Free French, first saw the name Madagascar on a can of singe doing duty for corned beef at Bir Hakeim in 1942... Mr Stratton has a baroque turn of style that offers in the first few pages words like 'struthious,' 'rhipidistian', and 'xerophytic'.

His last major work to appear was a biography of the Ottoman architect Mimar Sinan, which when it was published in 1972 he dedicated "Chiefly to the Turks".

In 1973, a donation Stratton made to Bowdoin College was noted in the President's annual report. He died on 3 September 1975. In his memory, Barbara Stratton Bolling and Deborah S. Booker presented a collection of prints to the University of Missouri's Museum of Art and Archaeology, including work from Ethiopia, a lithographic portrait by Edvard Munch of the composer Frederick Delius, and comic art by Honoré Daumier.

In 1945, Stratton's sister Barbara had married Richard Walker Bolling, later a Democratic Congressman from Kansas City, Missouri, and chairman of the United States House Committee on Rules. Barbara Stratton had four children, one with Bolling and three by a previous marriage.

== Major publications ==
- Arthur Stratton (1955). One Man's India. W.W. Norton & Company, New York City.
- Arthur Stratton (1964). The Great Red Island: A biography of Madagascar. MacMillan & Co.
- Arthur Stratton (1972). Sinan: Biography of One of the World's Greatest Architects and a Portrait of the Golden Age of the Ottoman Empire. Macmillan Publishers. ISBN 0-333-02901-1.

== Other publications ==
- Arthur Stratton, Brush Fire; a play in 3 acts (1936)
- Arthur Stratton, See While the City Sleeps. My next play; a play in 3 acts (1936)
- Arthur Mills Stratton, 'The Battle for the Sands: Ambulance at Bit Hacheim', in The Atlantic November 1942 issue (vol. 170, no. 5)
- A. M. P. Stratton, Lord Love Us (New York: Charles Scribner's Sons, 1948, a novel)
- Stories in Edwin Seaver (ed.), Cross section 1948: a collection of new American writing (New York: Simon & Schuster, 1948)
- Arthur Mills Stratton, 'A Letter-Box at Ephesus', in Cross section: a collection of new American writing volume 4 (1969)

== Quotations ==
- "Radama was a conqueror. He was a drunkard. Andrianampoinimerina, the Prince Worthy of the Highland People Under the Sun, made his son into an alcoholic and, in effect, cut the young man's throat."
- "Madagascar's great luxury is space, luminous, beautiful emptiness, mile after mile of grassland, brush, and woodland, broken by craggy mountains."
- "Of lemurs, Madagascar has almost the monopoly; this charming primate family branched off the main stem of the tree too soon — before the monkeys, before the apes, before the Hominidae."
- " 'So am I American', she said, speaking educated, cultivated French; and, having surprised me, coolly added 'Central American, from Martinique' ".
