= Pavel Josef Vejvanovský =

Czech composer

- Born: c. 1639; Hlučín or Hukvaldy
- Died: 24 July 1693; Kroměříž

Signature
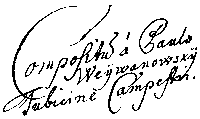

Pavel Josef Vejvanovský (c. 1639 – 24 July 1693) was a Czech-Moravian composer and trumpeter of the Baroque period.

== Life ==
Vejvanovský was born probably in Hlučín (possibly in Hukvaldy), probably in 1639 or 1640 (1633 is also sometimes mentioned). He received an education at the Jesuit university in Opava, where he also began composing. Moravia had been devastated during the Thirty Years War and much of it was in desperate need of rebuilding. The Habsburg authorities appointed the influential and ambitious Karl II von Liechtenstein-Kastelkorn as Prince-Bishop of Olomouc who set about to rebuild much of the region. This included building himself a grand palace in Italian Renaissance style with elaborate gardens in the nearby town of Kromeriz and employing a large group of musicians drawn from throughout Europe to play at his court and churches. In the 1650s the job of running and directing this prestigious ensemble fell to Vejvanovský, who was regularly singled out for praise by the Bishop.

As a composer his output is uneven, but in his later works he was able to master most typical idioms of the day. He seems to have struggled with imitative counterpoint and his most compelling pieces are characterised by charming folk idioms and virtuosic brass writing. He composed in a wide variety of genres ranging from large-scale Mass settings and music for special feast days to more intimate sonatas and suites. In addition to his musical responsibilities, he also maintained the Bishop's music library and was the primary copyist of the collection, with his hand appearing in hundreds of manuscripts. His own compositions circulated throughout central Europe, appearing in other Czech collections as well as in Germany and Austria. He seems to have made at least one visit to Austria with the purpose of copying and collecting music and it is largely thanks to Vejvanovský that so much central-European music from the time is preserved in what is widely regarded as one of the most important collections of late seventeenth century music on the Continent.

Vejvanovský must have been one of the greatest trumpet virtuosos of the age and his numerous compositions attest to his virtuosity. One of his more remarkable talents was the ability to play certain chromatic passages on the trumpet, which is not normally possible on the largely diatonic natural trumpet. Under Vejvanovský's direction the Bishop's ensemble saw its heyday. Other musicians at court included Philipp Jakob Rittler, Heinrich Biber, and Gottfried Finger, the latter two employing certain characteristics of Vejvanovský's trumpet writing in their own compositions.

He was a contemporary and associate of Heinrich Ignaz Franz von Biber.

== Works ==
- Balletti pro tabula: 2 Clarini, 2 Violini, 2 Violae, Violoncello, Organo
- Missa salvatoris: SATB, 2 Clarini, 2 Violini, 2 Viole, BC, 3 Tromboni colle parte ad libitum
- Sonata a 6: 2 Violini, 2 Cornetti, Clarino, Violone, Organo
- Sonata ittalica a 12: 3 Violini, 2 Cornetti, 3 Clarini, 4 Violae, Organo
- Sonata natalis: 2 Clarini, 2 Violini, 4 Violae, Organo
- Sonata Sancti Mauritii: 2 Clarini, 2 Violini, 2 Violae, Organo
- Sonata tribus quadrantibus: Clarino, Violino, Trombone, Organo
- Sonata vespertina: 2 Clarini, 3 Tromboni, 2 Violini, Organo
- Sonata venatoria in D: 2 Clarini, 2 Violini, Viola, Organo

== See also ==
- Heinrich Ignaz Franz von Biber
- Johann Heinrich Schmelzer
- Joannes Baptista Dolar
- Andreas Hofer
- Kroměříž
- Baroque trumpet
- Cornett
