= Andreas Hofer (composer) =

German composer

Andreas Hofer (ca. 1629 – 25 February 1684) was a German composer of the Baroque period.

Hofer was born at Reichenhall. He was a contemporary of Heinrich Ignaz Franz von Biber, whose predecessor he was in Salzburg in his office of Inspector and Hofkapellmeister, i.e., director of the court orchestra. Like Biber, Hofer was noted for his large-scale polychoral sacred works. It has been suggested that Hofer was the composer of the famous Missa Salisburgensis à 53 voci, which earlier had been attributed to Orazio Benevoli, although it is now accepted that it was the work of Biber.

Hofer died at Salzburg. His compositions contain significant roles for instruments like the cornetto, trombone or sackbut and trumpet. Little of his music has been performed or recorded in recent times; several scores, however, have been made available.

== Compositions ==
- Missa Archi Episcopalis à 19: 8 Voci Concertati SSAA/TTBB, 2 Violini, 2 Viole, 2 Cornetti, 2 Trombettae ("Clarini"), 3 Tromboni, Organo con Violone (1668?)
- Missa valete: SSATB, 2 Violini, 2 Viole, 2 Trombettae, 2 Cornetti, 3 Tromboni, Organo, Violone.
- Dextera Domini à 17: SATB, SATB, 2 Cornetti, 3 Tromboni, 4 Viole da Braccia, Organo.
- Fundata est Domus (De Dedicatione) à 12: SSATTB in concerto, SSATTB in ripieno, 2 Violini, 2 Viole, 2 Cornetti, Organo (with opening Sonata).
- Gaudeamus exultemus à 15: SATB, SATB, 4 Viole da Braccia, 2 Cornetti, 3 Tromboni, Organo.
- Estote fortes in bello à 15: SATB, SATB, 2 Violini, 2 Cornetti, 3 Tromboni, Organo
- Dixit Dominus: SATB concertato & ripieno, SATB concertato & ripieno, 2 Violini o 2 Cornetti, 3 Viole o 3 Tromboni, Organo.
- Magnificat à 17 (with Sonata): SATB, SATB, 4 Viole, 2 Cornetti, 3 Tromboni, Organo.
- Te Deum laudamus à 23: SATB, SATB, 2 Violini, 2 Viole, 5 Trombettae, Timpani, 2 Cornetti, 3 Tromboni, Organo.

== Available ==
1. Salmi e motetti: Laetatus sum, Magdeburg: Edition Walhall, 2008
2. Salmi e motetti: Nisi Dominus aedificaverit domus, Magdeburg: Edition Walhall, 2007
3. Salmi e motetti: Cum iucunditate cantemus, Magdeburg: Edition Walhall, 2007
4. Musikalische Vesper (recording), Kassel: Rainer Kahleyss, P 2007
5. Salmi e motetti: Laudate pueri Dominum, Magdeburg: Edition Walhall, 2004
6. Salmi e motetti: Confitebor tibi Domine
7. Salmi e motetti: Nisi Dominus aedificaverit domum, Magdeburg: Edition Walhall 2004
8. Psalmen und Motetten (1654) / (selection) Lauda Jerusalem Dominum, Magdeburg: Edition Walhall, c 2004, Partitur, Stimmen
9. Nisi Dominus
10. Missa "Valete", Altötting: Alfred Coppenrath, c 1990
11. Te Deum, Vienna: Universal-Edition, 1980
12. Psalmi brevi, Vienna : Universal-Edition, 1979 c, 1. ed.

== See also ==
- Heinrich Ignaz Franz von Biber
- Pavel Josef Vejvanovský
- Johann Heinrich Schmelzer
- Joannes Baptista Dolar
- Johann Joseph Fux
- Orazio Benevoli
- Salzburg
- Kroměříž
- Reichenhall
- Moravia
- Polychoral
- Colossal Baroque
- Cornett
- Cornettino
- Natural trumpet
- Trombone
- Sackbut
