= String Quartet No. 1 (Szymanowski) =

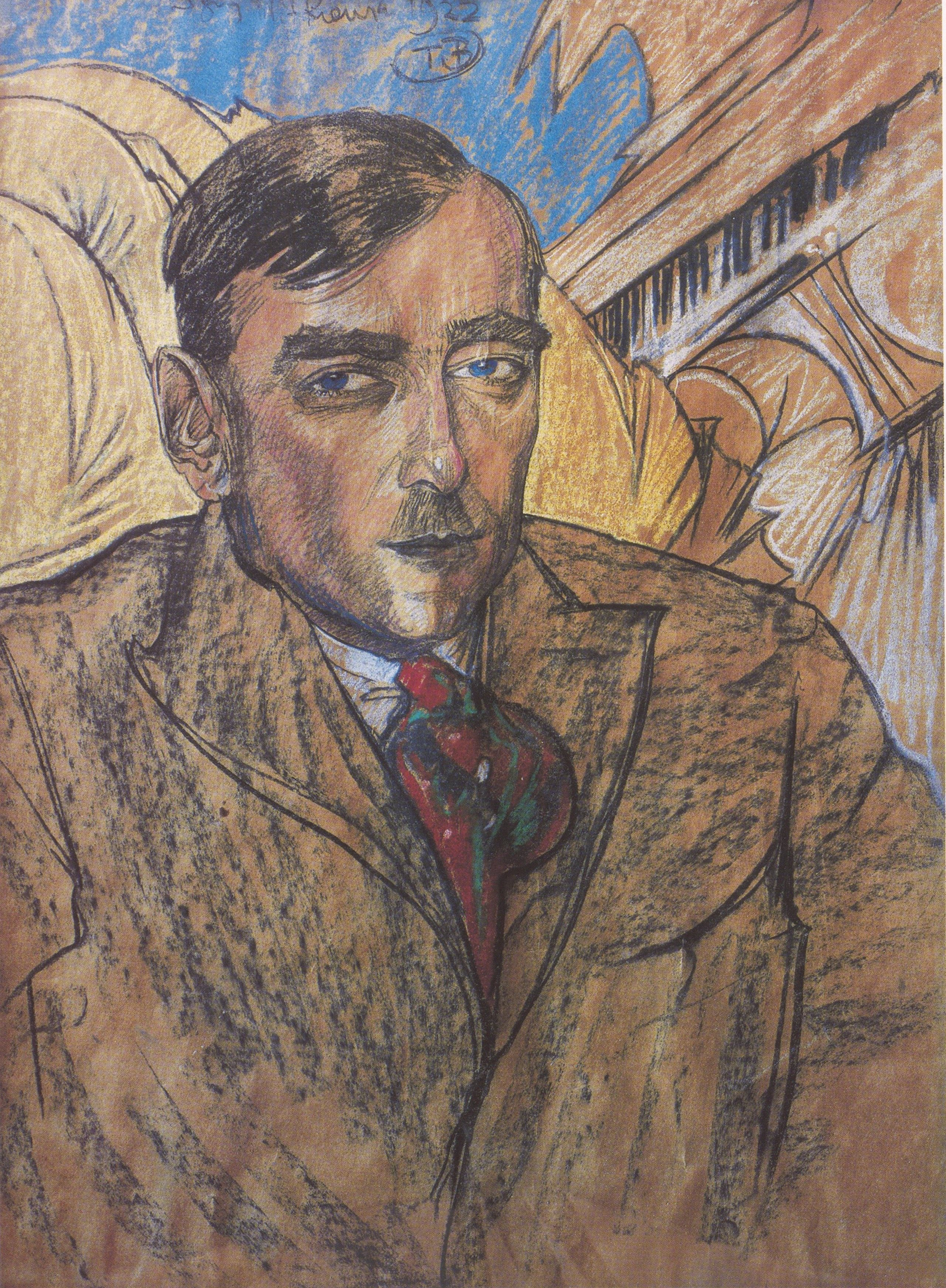
Portrait of Karol Szymanowski, 1922

String Quartet No. 1 in C major, Op. 37, is a composition for string quartet by Karol Szymanowski. It was the first of the two string quartets composed by Szymanowski. The work is from 1917 during his middle period. It is notable for its "polytonal" third movement, which contains four key signatures in its written four parts: the first violin with 3 sharps, the second violin with 6 sharps, the viola with 3 flats, and the cello with no flats or sharps.

Dedicated to the French musicologist Henry Prunières, the work won the first prize in the Polish Ministry of Religious Denominations and Public Enlightenment's chamber music competition. Its first public performance was in Warsaw on 7 March 1924 played by the Warsaw Philharmonic Quartet. Szymanowski planned on including a fourth movement, a fugal finale, but the idea ultimately got scrapped. A performance usually lasts 17-18 minutes.

== Recordings ==
String quartets who have recorded the piece include:

- Warsaw String Quartet. Da Camera Magna (coissue? with Pavane) (1982) (OCLC 900321717)
- Wilanow String Quartet. (1982) [Veriton (1979); Polskie Nagrania Edition (1994)]
- Varsovia Quartet. (1982 Vinyl, Pavane Records – ADW 7118) Olympia (1989)
- Carmina Quartet. (Denon CD, 1992)
- Goldner String Quartet. Naxos (2000)
- Meccore String Quartet. Polskie Nagrania/Warner Music Poland (2015)

== See also ==
- List of polytonal pieces
