= Joaquín Martínez de la Roca =

Spanish composer

Joaquín Jara (Zaragoza, c. 1676 - Toledo, 1747 or 1756) was a Spanish composer.

In 1715, when he was organist of Valencia Cathedral, Martínez initiated the five-year-long pamphlet war against Francisco Valls for the unconventional dissonances in the Miserere of Valls' Missa Scala Aretina.

== Works ==
- Los Desgravios de Troya (1712), composed for the birth of the crown prince, Don Philip, Infante of Spain, born at Madrid, June 7, 1712. The 1712 publication of the score was the first example of the publication of Spanish theatre music.

== Discography ==
- selections from Los Desgravios de Troya (1712) on Canciones de amor y de guerra, Maria Luz Alvarez, Clarincanto, Pneuma 390, 2002.
