= Cornettino =

Descant instrument of the cornetto family

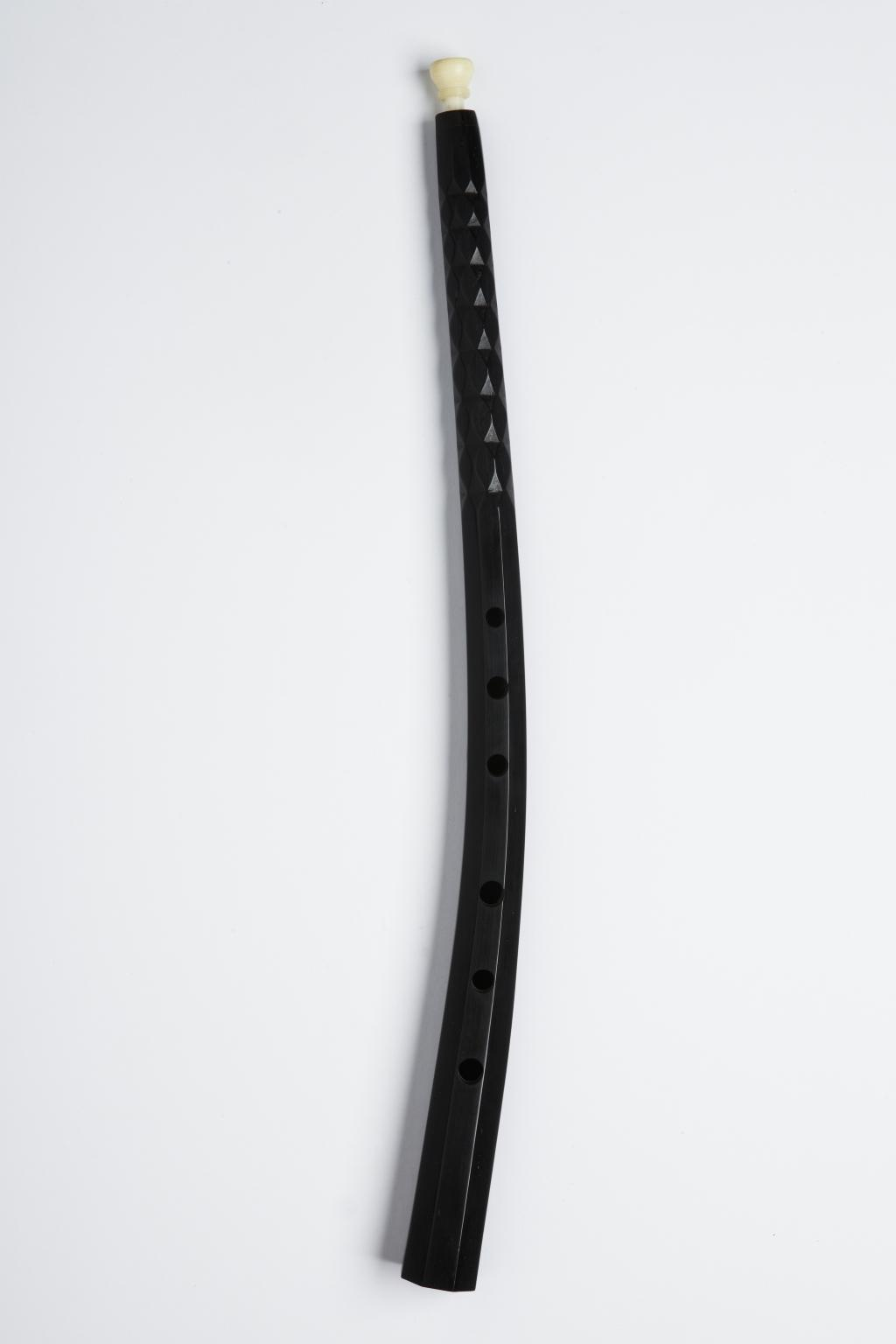
- Replica cornettino in epoxy resin, by Christopher Monk c. 1970

Brass instrument
- Classification: Aerophone; Labrosone
- Hornbostel–Sachs classification: 423.212 (Aerophone sounded by lip vibration with irregular bore and finger holes)
- Developed: 15th century

Playing range

Related instruments
- Cornett; Natural trumpet; Oboe; Serpent

Musicians
- Bruce Dickey; Ralph Dudgeon; Christopher Monk; Crispian Steele-Perkins; Jeremy West

Builders
- 3D Music Instruments; Christopher Monk Instruments

The cornettino (Italian, plural cornettini; German: Diskant Zink, Quart-Zink) is the small descant instrument of the cornett family of lip-reed wind instruments, a fourth or fifth higher than the larger, more common treble cornett. Cornettini were built in two sizes, usually described as in D or C, although the note sounded with all finger-holes covered is E or D, respectively, which can be lowered a further whole tone to D or C by slackening the embouchure. The name cornettino in Italian means a small cornetto, which in turn means "small horn".

== Construction ==
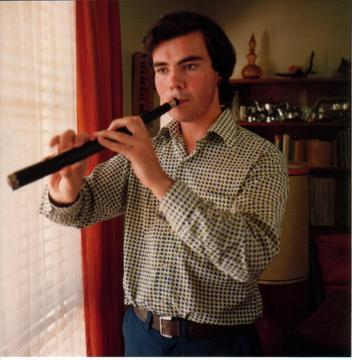
A musician playing the Cornettino

Surviving specimens of cornettino are 35 to 37 centimetres (14 to 15 in) long for the earlier higher pitched instrument in D, and 39 to 46 cm (15 to 18 in) for the instrument in C. The treble cornetts in G range from 51 to 63 cm (20 to 25 in) in length. These large variations of instrument lengths are mostly due to the variation of pitch standards that prevailed in Europe at different times and places, with A_{4} ranging from 415 to 510 Hz. Like organs and trombones, the cornettino was regarded as primarily a church instrument, and hence was constructed in Chor-ton (choir pitch) at the height of its popularity in the 17th century, which was around 466 Hz.

Like the cornetto, the cornettino was usually made from two lengthwise halves of wood, often walnut or boxwood, with the bore carved out and glued together. The instrument was then tightly covered with black-dyed leather or parchment to prevent leaks and improve the grip for the player. The mouthpieces were made from animal horn, bone or ivory.

Some German-made instruments featured decorative ferrules of silver, gold, or gold-plated brass at one or both ends of the instrument, to prevent the fraying of the leather or parchment. A small number of surviving cornettini were made from ivory, usually highly ornamented with decorative carved designs.

Modern replica instruments are made by a small number of historical instrument manufacturers, some using modern composite materials or epoxy resin, pioneered by Christopher Monk in the mid-20th century revival of the cornett.

=== Variants ===
Three mute cornettini survive, one in Nuremberg and two in Vienna (id est descant mute cornetti). These instruments are straight, like their treble counterparts, with an integral mouthpiece. No extant music for the mute cornettino has yet come to light and the function of this instrument remains obscure. The surviving score of the large scale madrigal, Udite chiari e generosi figli à 16 voci, by Giovanni Gabrieli, requires a cornetto muto on the cantus line of Choro I. Since this part requires the instrument to play up to A_{5}, a mute cornettino may have been intended by the composer - certainly this part would be readily playable on such an instrument, although, the tessitura of the part is well within the compass of a regular mute cornett in G or F.

== History ==
Cornettini were common in the high Renaissance and the Baroque musical periods. They were featured extensively in Northern European music and ignored almost entirely by Southern European composers, except those who migrated north. In the time of Michael Praetorius, the cornettino seems to have sometimes been used in sacred vocal music to play in unison with voices (especially tenors) an octave higher. Later in the 17th century, Northern European composers frequently used cornettini in large scale Masses, cantatas and other sacred music. The cornettino was favoured by the Stadtpfeiffen and composers like Johann Caspar Horn and Matthias Spiegler wrote a significant quantity of consort music featuring one to three cornettini. It appears that the cornettino continued to be used, primarily in church music and in Stadtpfeiffer bands, in some places in Europe until the late 18th century. Georg Philipp Telemann and Johann Sebastian Bach used the cornettino in several church cantatas.

== Range ==
The tessitura of the cornettino is C_{4} (middle C) to around G_{5}, although a competent player with a strong embouchure can play higher; the highest note in the repertoire is E_{6}.

== Timbre ==
The timbre of the cornettino is brighter and more incisive than that of the regular cornetto. Cornettini were frequently used in large consorts and orchestras in the company of trumpets and high violin parts. The timbre of the instrument seems to have been regarded by 17th century Northern European composers as very agreeable juxtaposed the natural trumpets of the time which featured a conical bell and a much more "oboe-like" sound and the violins pitched at A_{4} = 466 Hz. The second and third octaves of the cornettino can be made to sound piercing. The primary/fundamental octave has an agreeable "reedy" quality, which is reminiscent of the later oboe.

== Repertoire ==
Some composers who specified the use of the cornettino in their scores include: Michael Praetorius, Heinrich Schütz, Johann Heinrich Schmelzer, Heinrich Ignaz Franz von Biber, Matthias Weckmann, Antonio Bertali, Johann Caspar Horn, Johann Erasmus Kindermann, Matthias Spiegler, Johann Vierdanck, Johann Sebastian Bach and Georg Philipp Telemann.

Works by Heinrich Ignaz Franz von Biber and Andreas Hofer specify the cornetto in a number of sacred compositions, but one may presume that such parts were intended to be played on cornettini on account of the tessitura of such parts. The Missa Salisburgensis à 53 voci is an example.

== Nomenclature ==
The cornettino was also known as: Cornettin [Cornettinen], Kornettin, Quart-Zink, Klein Discant Zink, Klein Diskant Zink, Diskant Zink, Krummer Diskant Zink and corñio (as in Bach's chorale cantata Christum wir sollen loben schon, BWV 121). The accepted English plurals of "cornettino" are "cornettini" and "cornettinos".

== Bibliography ==
- Baines, Anthony (1967). Woodwind Instruments and their History (3rd ed.). New York: Dover Publications (published 1991). ISBN 978-0-486-26885-9. LCCN 91023745. OCLC 24010861. OL 1544645M. Wikidata Q115155619.
- Dickey, Bruce; Collver, Michael (1996). A Catalogue of Music for the Cornett. Bloomington: Indiana University Press. ISBN 0-253-20974-9.
- Herbert, Trevor; Myers, Arnold; Wallace, John, eds. (2019). The Cambridge Encyclopedia of Brass Instruments. Cambridge University Press. doi:10.1017/9781316841273. ISBN 978-1-316-63185-0. OL 34730943M. Wikidata Q136027509.
- Klaus, Sabine (2013). Ways to Expand the Harmonic Series. Trumpets and Other High Brass. Vol. 2. Vermillion: National Music Museum. ISBN 978-0-9848269-2-6. Wikidata Q116447957.
