= Els Bongers =

Dutch singer

- Education: Sweelinck Conservatory Amsterdam
- Occupation: Classical soprano

Els Bongers is a Dutch soprano singer active in concert, opera and musical theatre.

== Career ==
Els Bongers studied voice at the Sweelinck Conservatory Amsterdam with Margreet Honig and Jan-Hendrik Rootering, where she received her diploma in 1993. She took master classes with Elly Ameling and Kurt Equiluz.

She took part in the project of Ton Koopman to record the complete vocal works of Johann Sebastian Bach with the Amsterdam Baroque Orchestra & Choir and participated also in the recording of Biber's Requiem (for 15 voices) and Vesperae (for 32 voices). After previously understudying the role, she took over the part of Christine from Joke de Kruijf in The Phantom of the Opera at the VSB Circustheater in 1993.
