= Carl Heinrich Biber =

German violinist and composer

Carl Heinrich Biber (4 September 1681 – 19 November 1749) was a late Baroque violinist and composer.

He was born in Salzburg, the sixth son of Heinrich Ignaz Franz Biber. He received his first musical education from him. In 1704, he made a study trip to Venice and Rome, important centers of music. After his return, he was employed as a violinist and valet and from 1714, he was appointed Vicekapellmeister at the Salzburg court. In 1743, he succeeded Hofkapellmeister Matthias Sigismund Biechteler (1668?–1743) and he was also the supervisor of Leopold Mozart. He died in his native city of Salzburg, aged 68.

He belongs to a generation of composers who represented the stylistic transition between composers committed to the older, late Baroque style ideal and rococo composers. His output consists mainly of masses and other liturgical works that also includes instrumental church sonatas. The latter are mostly string sonatas with organ accompaniment, seldom brass and woodwind instruments.
