= John Zdechlik =

American composer (1937–2020)

- Born: John Paul Zdechlik; May 2, 1937; Minneapolis, Minnesota, U.S.
- Died: May 21, 2020 (aged 83) White Bear Lake, Minnesota, U.S.
- Occupations: Conductor, composer
- Instruments: Piano, trumpet

John Zdechlik (Zuh-DECK-lik; May 2, 1937 – May 21, 2020) was an American composer, music teacher, and conductor. He was elected to the American Bandmasters Association and many of his compositions became standard concert band repertoire, including Chorale and Shaker Dance.

== Family and early life ==
Zdechlik was the youngest of five children. He was born to a Polish father, who emigrated from Lipiny in 1910. The surname "Zdechlik" is arguably Czech in linguistic origin, though it occurs exclusively in Poland. Zdechlik had musical influences growing up - his grandfather was a church organist, his father regularly played recordings of Beethoven and Victor Herbert, and his parents enrolled him in piano lessons at age six. Zdechlik's parents encouraged musical pursuits but did not pressure him.

== Formal education ==
In high school, Zdechlik began playing E-flat alto horn before switching to trumpet. During his high school years he also began to take an interest in jazz, and began to compose jazz band arrangements under the tutelage of his trumpet instructor Harry Strobel and local arranger and jazz pianist Herb Pilhofer. According to Zdechlik, he was most interested in jazz ensembles in the style of Stan Kenton and Count Basie and he began to arrange works in a similar style for individuals and bands in the Minneapolis area, including the Denny Murphy Band. Zdechlik also credits the work of jazz pianist George Shearing as an important early reference of learning tonal harmony.

Zdechlik enrolled as a music education major at the University of Minnesota, graduating in 1957. He spent two years teaching at the high school level and one year at St. Cloud State University before returning to the University of Minnesota for his master's and doctorate degrees. While pursuing his graduate degrees, Zdechlik worked closely with Frank Bencriscutto, serving as his assistant from 1963 to 1970. Following the death of Bencriscutto in 1997, Zdechlik penned Hats Off to Thee, a composition for brass ensemble and timpani in memory of Bencriscutto.

In addition to Bencriscutto, Zdechlik studied composition and theory under Paul Fetler and Dominick Argento. Zdechlik received his Ph.D. in Theory and Composition from the University of Minnesota in 1970.

== Career ==
Thanks to Frank Bencriscutto, Zdechlik's first major success as a composer came in 1969. Bencriscutto had been commissioned to write an original work for the Concordia College Band in Saint Paul, Minnesota, but was too busy to fulfill the commitment. The commissioner, Leon Titus, agreed to have Zdechlik fill in as the composer, resulting in Zdechlik's first major compositional success, Psalm 46.

In 1970, Zdechlik began his tenure at Lakewood Community College (now Century College) in White Bear Lake, Minnesota, where he served for nearly three decades as conductor, professor, music department chair, and resident composer until his retirement in 1997.

Soon after he began teaching, a commission from Bloomington Jefferson High School in Bloomington, Minnesota resulted in Zdechlik's most famous work, Chorale and Shaker Dance, which premiered at the Music Educators National Conference in 1972. Zdechlik claimed to have guest conducted the piece over 500 times in his career.

Owing to his early success as a composer for the concert band medium, the vast majority of Zdechlik's future output was also for bands, most of which are commissions from high school or college ensembles. Dozens of his works have been published by Neil A. Kjos Music Company and Zdechlik conducted extensively throughout the United States, Japan, and Europe.

Zdechlik was elected to the American Bandmasters Association in 1989 and lived in White Bear Lake, Minnesota at his death.

He died from complications of Parkinson's disease and COVID-19 on May 21, 2020.

== Compositions ==
A selective list of original compositions is included below.

=== Concert band ===
- Psalm 46 (1971)
- Chorale and Shaker Dance (1972)
- Grace Variants (1973)
- Lyric Statement (1975)
- Dance and Variations (1976)
- Faces of Kum Ba Yah (1978)
- Rondo Capriccio (1979)
- Z's Blues (1980)
- Lake Washington Suite (1983)
- Celebrations (1988)
- In Dulci Jubilo (1988)
- Chorale and Shaker Dance II (1989)
- Grand Rapids Suite (1989)
- Prelude and Fugue (1996)
- Rondo Jubiloso (1997)
- Barcarole for Flutes and Band (1997)
- Windsong (2005)
- Sing My Tongue, Alleluia (2006)

=== Orchestra ===
- Four Pieces for Orchestra (1970)

=== Chamber ===
- Fanfare for Four Trumpet Trios (1977)
- Sonata for Flute and Piano (1981)
- Impromptu for Flute (1985)
- Concerto for French Horn and Band (1996)
- Hats Off to Thee (brass ensemble and timpani) (1998)
- A Centennial Fanfare (brass ensemble) (2002)
- Balade: Solo for Euphonium with Band (2007)

== Bibliography ==
- Anderson, E. Ruth: Contemporary American Composers: A Biographical Dictionary, Second Edition, Boston: GK Hall, 1982, ISBN 978-0816182237
- Bernard-Stevens, Sarah Ann (2012): An Examination of Works for Wind Band, Brass Ensemble and Percussion Ensemble: "Suite Francaise" by Darius Milhaud, "Hats Off to Thee" by John Zdechlik and "Mercury Rising" by Nathan Daughtry (M.M.), Kansas State University
- Bierley, Paul E and Rehrig, William H: The Heritage Encyclopedia of Band Music: Composers and Their Music, Westerville, Ohio: Integrity Press, 1991, ISBN 0-918048-08-7
- A Composer's Insight, Volume 3: Thoughts, Analysis and Commentary Masterpieces for Wind Band, Salzman, Timothy (Ed.). Meredith Music Publications: Galesville, MD, 2006, ISBN 978-1574630480
- Jaques Cattell Press: Who's Who in American Music: Classical, First Edition, New York: RR Bowker, 1983, ISBN 978-0835217255
- Pursell, Anthony: "Chorale and Shaker Dance by John Zdechlik," Teaching Music through Performance in Band Volume 1, Ed. Richard Miles, 2nd ed.: Chicago: GIA, 2010, ISBN 978-1579997885
