= Battalia à 10 =

1673 composition by Heinrich Ignaz Franz Biber

- Chamber music by Heinrich Ignaz Franz Biber
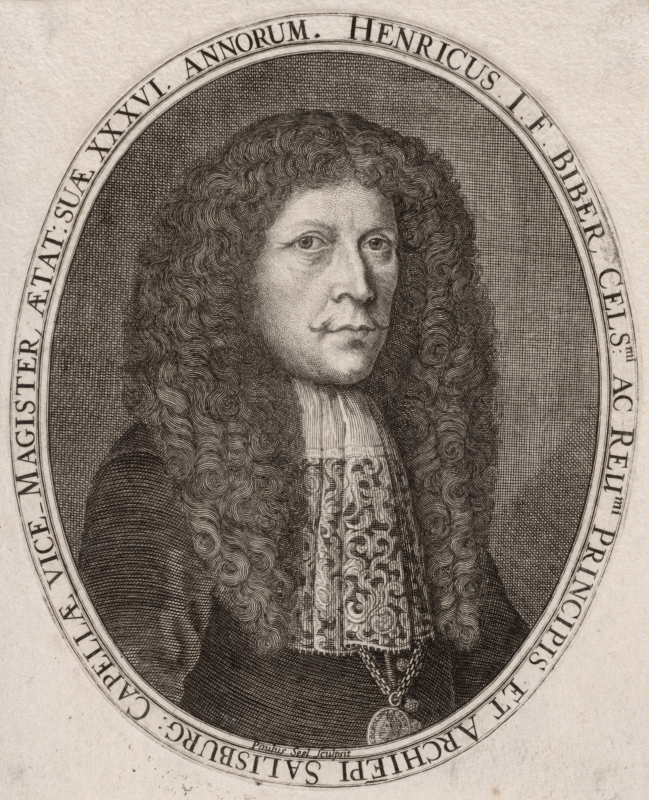
- Engraving of the composer
- Composed: 1673
- Scoring: 3 violins; 4 violas; 2 violones; basso continue

Battalia à 10 ("Battle for Ten") is a piece of chamber music written by the Bohemian-Austrian composer Heinrich Ignaz Franz Biber. The work is known for its early use of polytonality and non-conventional techniques. Written in 1673, Battalia is scored for 3 violins, 4 violas, 2 violones, and continuo.

== History ==
Why Biber wrote the Battalia is uncertain, but some scholars say it was the composer's feelings toward the Thirty Years' War (1618 - 1648), with its high casualties (around half of the German population and one third of the Czechs).

== Analysis ==
=== Sonata (Presto I) ===
The Sonata is in AB form; the B section uses a call and response motif, the response of which uses a staccatissimo mark to signal col legno or to hit the string with the back of the bow.

=== Die liederliche Gesellschaft von allerley Humor (The Profligate Society of Common Humor) ===
The most famous, the second movement incorporates 8 melodies, but in different key and time signatures. One of the melodies is the folk song, "Cabbage and turnips have driven me away" (Kraut und Rüben haben mich vertrieben), similarly used in J. S. Bach's 30th Goldberg Variation, or the Quodlibet. Also some measures are in 12/8 time and the others in 4/4 time. There is a Latin footnote that reads hic dissonant ubique, nam enim sic diversis cantilenis clamore solent or "here it is dissonant everywhere, for thus are the drunks accustomed to bellow with different songs".

=== Allegro (Presto II) ===
The form is A-A-B-B and uses left-hand pizzicato, indicated by a staccato dot. The music is cheerful but irregular, as if evoking soldiers' whistling past the graveyard.

=== Der Mars (The March) ===
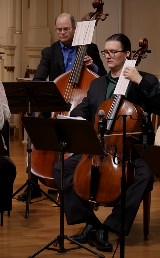
A demonstration from Voices of Music performance.

Der Mars is written for solo violin and prepared or modified violone. As the violin plays trills and ornaments, the violone imitates the sound of a snare drum by placing a sheet of paper between the strings and the fingerboard. A similar section titled Musqetir Mars (Musketeer's March) is used in the Sonata Representativa in A major.

=== Presto III ===
The third presto is canonic in nature with one interlocking theme with accompaniment as shown by the diagram at the bottom at this page.

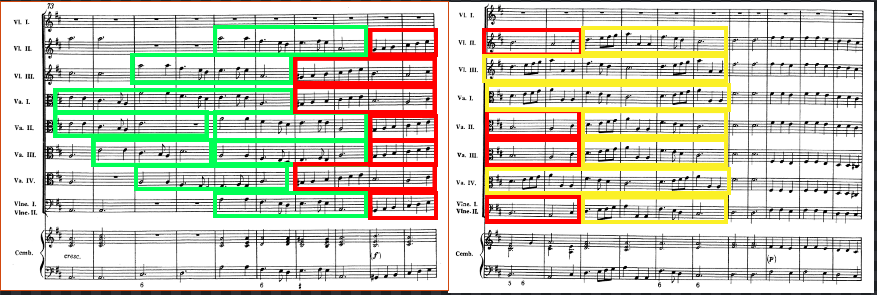
Diagram highlighting first entries of new thematic material

=== Aria ===
After the bravado of the preceding movements, Biber inserts a contemplative aria on the eve of the battle.

=== Die Schlacht (The Battle) ===
Antiphonally divided violones imitate opposing musket fire via snap pizzicato (an extended technique famously used by Béla Bartók more than 200 years later).

=== Lamento Adagio ===
More fully 'Lamento Der Verwundten Musquetirer' (Lament of the wounded musketeers); the work concludes with a slow movement, representing a tragic lament.
