= Joannes Baptista Dolar =

Joannes Baptista Dolar (Slovene: Janez Krstnik Dolar or Janez Kersnik Dolar, Czech: Jan Křtitel Tolar, also Tollar or Thollary; c. 1620, Kamnik – February 13, 1673, Vienna) was a composer and contemporary of Heinrich Ignaz Franz von Biber, Johann Heinrich Schmelzer, Andreas Hofer and Pavel Josef Vejvanovský.

== Education ==
Dolar attended a Jesuit college in Ljubljana until 1639, when he began studying philosophy and later theology at the University of Vienna. He may have studied music at the time, as well, with local musicians like Antonio Bertali. He also began the process of joining the Jesuit order in 1639, and was ordained a priest in 1652.

== Career ==
Janez Krstnik Dolar was employed to oversee musical performance at the Jesuit college in Ljubljana from 1656 to 1658. Around 1661 or 162, he returned to Vienna, where he spent the rest of his life. He became the head of St. Ignatius and St. Pancratius Jesuit college, and also served as the musical director for a convent church.

Dolar's compositions are characteristic of European music from the middle of the Baroque period, including use of stile concertato.

== Works ==
Dolar composed a number of large-scale instrumental and vocal works, many of them as part of his official duties. Only 14 of his works are known to survive, including:

- Sonata à 13: 2 Violini, 2 Viole, Fagotto, 2 Clarini, 2 Cornetti, 4 Tromboni, Violone & Organo.
- Miserere mei Deus: SATB, SATB in concerto, SATB, SATB in cappella, 2 Violini, 2 Viole, 2 Clarini, 2 Cornetti Muti, 3 Tromboni, Violone & Organo.
- Missa Viennensis: SSSSAAAATTTTBBBB in concerto, SATB in cappella, 2 Cornetti, 2 Clarini, 4 Tromboni, Fagotto, 3 Violini, 2 Violae, Violoncello, Violone, Organo.
- Missa villana : For solo voices (SSATTB), chorus (SSATTB), and string orchestra.
