= Karl II von Liechtenstein-Kastelkorn =

- Prince-Bishop of Olomouc
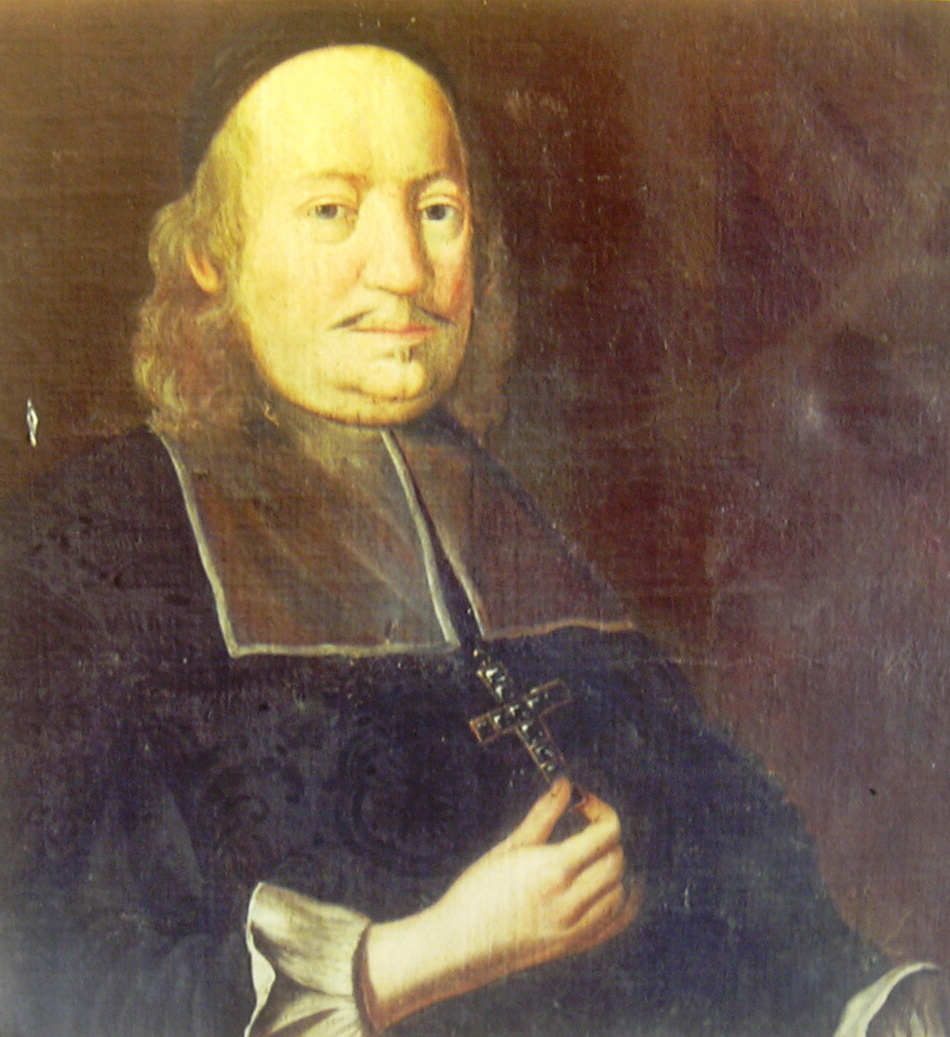
- Native name: Karel II. z Lichtensteinu-Castelcorna
- Church: Catholic Church
- Diocese: Diocese of Olomouc
- In office: 11 August 1664 – 23 September 1695
- Predecessor: Charles Joseph of Austria
- Successor: Charles Joseph of Lorraine

Orders
- Ordination: 1655

Personal details
- Born: 1623 Glatz, County of Kladsko, Kingdom of Bohemia, Holy Roman Empire
- Died: 23 September 1695 (aged 71–72)

Karl II von Liechtenstein-Kastelkorn (1623–1695) was a Catholic priest and prince-bishop. In 1655 he was ordained priest in the Prince-Archbishopric of Salzburg (a part of today's Austria). Between 1664 and 1695 he served as Prince-Bishop of Olomouc in Moravia (a part of today's Czech Republic). A cultured man who employed in his Kapelle Heinrich Ignaz Franz Biber, the virtuoso violinist and composer, he was also among other things a collector of music, and maintained close ties with the imperial court in Vienna throughout his career.

In the period of his episcopacy many people were executed for alleged witchcraft, including the dean Christoph Alois Lautner who was sentenced to death and burned alive by the inquisition court. The personal secretary of Karl II was a member of the inquisition court.

== Sources ==
- Biographical sketch in "The Hierarchy of the Catholic Church"

Karl von Liechtenstein-Kastelkorn House of Liechtenstein-Kastelkorn Born: 17 March 1623 in Kladsko (Bohemia) Died: 23 September 1695 in Olomouc
Religious titles
Regnal titles
Preceded by Charles I Joseph	Prince-Bishop of Olomouc as Charles II; 1664–1695	Succeeded by Charles III Joseph
