= Orazio Benevoli =

Italian composer

Orazio Benevoli or Benevolo (19 April 1605 – 17 June 1672) was a Franco-Italian composer of large scaled polychoral sacred choral works (e.g., one work featured forty-eight vocal and instrumental lines) of the middle Baroque era.

== Biography ==
He was born in Rome to a French baker and confectioner, Robert Venouot or Vénevot, whose name was Italianized to Benevolo. Benevoli was a choirboy at San Luigi dei Francesi in Rome (1617–23). He later assumed posts as maestro di cappella at Santa Maria in Trastevere (from 1624), Santo Spirito in Sassia (from 1630), and his old church San Luigi dei Francesi from 1638. Benevoli served as Kapellmeister in the court of Archduke Leopold Wilhelm of Austria from 1644 to 1646. Benevoli returned to Rome in 1646, where he remained for the rest of his life as choirmaster at both Santa Maria Maggiore and the Cappella Giulia of St. Peter's Basilica. He was made Guardiano of the Vatican's Congregazione di Santa Cecilia in the following three years of 1654, 1665 and 1667.

His pupils included Ercole Bernabei, Antimo Liberati and Paolo Lorenzani. (See: List of music students by teacher: A to B#Orazio Benevoli.)

Benevoli composed Masses, motets, Magnificats, and other sacred vocal works. Much of his fame as a composer has rested largely on his supposed composition of the fifty-three part Missa Salisburgensis, which musicologists long believed was written by Benevoli in Salzburg Cathedral in 1628. Nevertheless, external and internal evidence subsequently demonstrated that the Mass is in fact the work of composer Heinrich Ignaz Biber, and that it dates not from 1628 but from 1682.

== Works, editions and recordings ==
Benevoli's sacred compositions frequently make use of four or more choirs. Many of Benevoli's works are massive and in the Colossal Baroque style. Sixteen masses for 8 to 16 voices survive. Little of the music of Benevoli has been performed or recorded in modern times. However, the early music group I Fagiolini, under the direction of Robert Hollingworth, have released three recordings of Benevoli's multi-choir masses

- Orazio Benevolo - Sacred Music - Missa Azzolina Magnificat Dixit Dominus, Le Concert Spirituel (Niquet). Naxos (1996)
- Missa Tira Corda a 16, Tölzer Knabenchor (Gerhard Schmidt-Gaden) (2010)
- Mass for Four Choirs, I Fagiolini (Coro, 2023 & 2024)
- Missa Si Deus pro nobis a 16, RIAS Kammerchor (2024)
