= Chorale and Shaker Dance =

Musical composition by John Zdechlik

Chorale and Shaker Dance is a musical composition for concert band composed by John Zdechlik. It is a standard part of concert band literature, and it is frequently performed by student ensembles.

The piece was commissioned by the Jefferson High School Band of Bloomington, Minnesota, in honor of their conductor, Earl Benson. It was written in 1971 and premiered at the convention of Music Educators National Conference in Atlanta, Georgia in March of the following year.

== Composition details ==
Chorale and Shaker Dance is a lively composition based on two musical themes, an original melody (the "chorale") and the Shaker tune, "Simple Gifts". It begins with a woodwind chorale composed of piccolo, flute, oboe, E♭ clarinet, B♭ clarinet, E♭ alto clarinet, B♭ bass clarinet, bassoon, and alto saxophone with a canon theme exhibited several times between the saxophone and flute. Soon after, a call-and-response melody is featured between high and low woodwind. Then approximately halfway through the piece, the time signature is switched to 2/2 and changes several times between 2/2, 3/2, 3/4, 4/4, and 5/4 through a gloomy and dark passage. The alto sax and flute canon returns near the end, and is followed by a low instrument chorale and a repetition of the melody, ending with thundering timpani. The compositional ideas of the piece include augmentation and diminution, as well as polytonality, melodic fragmentation, and homophonic and polyphonic textures. Several portions of the song feature "call and response" between instrumental groups, and canon variations play an essential role in supporting the simple Shaker melody.

The composition is considered Grade 4 in difficulty and is commonly performed by high school, college, and community bands. It is John Zdechlik's most famous work, which he guest-conducted on over 500 occasions.

A more modestly scored arrangement of the piece, Chorale and Shaker Dance II, was published in 1989 and has become popular with middle school and high school ensembles.
