= Missa Salisburgensis à 53 voci =

Choral work

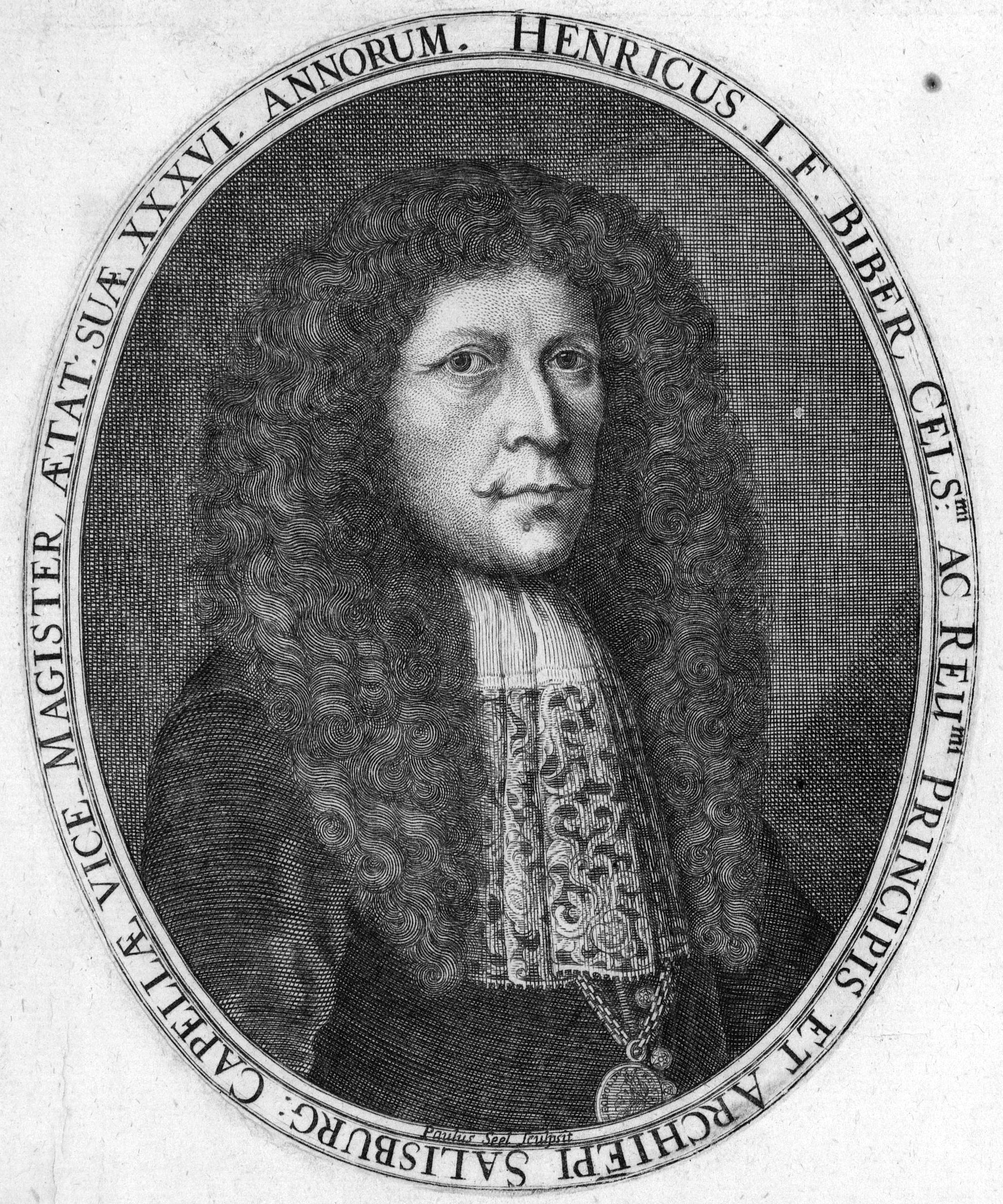
Portrait of Heinrich Ignaz Franz Biber

The Missa Salisburgensis à 53 voci is perhaps the largest-scale piece of extant sacred Baroque music, an archetypal work of the Colossal Baroque that is now universally accepted to be by Heinrich Ignaz Franz Biber. The manuscript score of this Mass was rediscovered in the 1870s in the home of a greengrocer in Salzburg, Austria. It has been said to have narrowly escaped being used to wrap vegetables.

In the late 19th century, musicologists, notably August Wilhelm Ambros and Franz Xavier Jelinek, attributed it to Orazio Benevoli, and argued that it had been performed in 1628; however in the mid-1970s, through modern methods of analyzing handwriting, watermarks, and history, Ernst Hintermaier "proved...definitely" that it was not by Benevoli. He also demonstrated that it must have been written for the 1682 commemoration of the 1100th anniversary of the Archbishopric of Salzburg. Hintermaier wrote in 2015 that the evidence rules out both Benevoli and Andreas Hofer, Biber's colleague, and concludes that "... the only possible composer of the Mass and the [companion] motet [for 54 voices, Plaudite Tympana] was Heinrich Ignaz Franz Biber... both the sources and the stylistic analysis clearly point to Biber as the author of the works."

== Scoring ==
The work is scored thus:

- Choro I: SSAATTBB in concerto* & in cappella*, Organo
- Choro II: 2 Violini, 4 Viole
- Choro III: 4 Flauti, 2 Oboi, 2 Clarini* (the oboe parts may have been added later; both parts appear to have been simply copied from the Flauto I and Flauto II lines, and there are no oboe solos in the entire Mass)
- Choro IV: 2 Cornetti, 3 Tromboni (each of the cornetto parts are almost certainly intended to be played on the Cornettino)
- Choro V: SSAATTBB in concerto & in cappella
- Choro VI: 2 Violini, 4 Viole
- Loco I: 4 Trombettæ, Timpani
- Loco II: 4 Trombettæ, Timpani
- Organo e Basso continuo

*Note: in concerto refers to the vocal soloists and in cappella refers to vocal tutti where extra singers join the soloists in the vocal lines. When the cappella choir is employed, the vocal lines are less complex than the solo parts for the voices in concerto. All of the viole lines are in C clefs and it is unclear whether the composer required instruments from the violin family, i.e. "violas da braccio" or viols, i.e. violas da gamba on these lines. The four "Flauti" lines require two descant (soprano), treble (alto), and tenor recorders. The "Trombettæ" are natural trumpets in C. The two "Clarini" are soloistic trumpet parts, composed predominantly for the highest octave of the natural trumpet.

== Styles and compositional techniques ==
The Missa Salisburgensis is a polychoral composition which takes advantage of the multiple organs and various locations available for groups of singers and musicians to perform in Salzburg Cathedral, probably for the 1682 celebrations marking the 1100th anniversary of the founding of the Archbishopric of Salzburg. The vocal parts feature in concerto (soloists) and in cappella (the full choir) parts across the sixteen vocal lines. However, several times in the Mass, the composer "collapses" all the voices into simple four part harmony (SATB) and uses some of the instrumental groups, the cornetto and trombone choir, in particular, to play in unison with the human voices. The work is in C major throughout – necessitated by the use of ten clarino trumpets in C. All the instruments have solo sections except the two oboes, which always play in unison with the first and second flauti (recorders). The work is stylistically similar to Biber's Vesperæ à 32 voci, and the Te Deum Laudamus à 23 voci of Andreas Hofer.

The appendix of the score, housed in Salzburg's Carolino Augusteum Museum, contains the equally scored hymn Plaudite tympana, that accompanies the mass.

== Recordings ==
- Otto Schneider Festival Concert Orchestra, St. Anthony Cathedral Choir, Hugo Schmid, organ, directed by Otto Schneider. Musical Heritage Society LP MHS 503 S (1950s)
- Escolania de Montserrat, Tölzer Knabenchor, Collegium Aureum directed by Ireneu Segarra. Deutsche Harmonia Mundi CD RD77050 (1974)
- Musica Antiqua Köln directed by Reinhard Goebel, Gabrieli Consort & Players directed by Paul McCreesh. Archiv Produktion CD 457 611–2 (1998)
- Amsterdam Baroque Orchestra & Choir directed by Ton Koopman. Erato CD 3984 25506 2 (1998)
- La Stagione Armonica directed by Sergio Balestracci. Amadeus "Speciale" 173
- Hesperion XXI, Le Concert des Nations and La Capella Reial de Catalunya directed by Jordi Savall. Alia Vox CD Cat. #9912 (2015)
