= Christ Blessing (Bellini, 1460) =

Painting by Giovanni Bellini

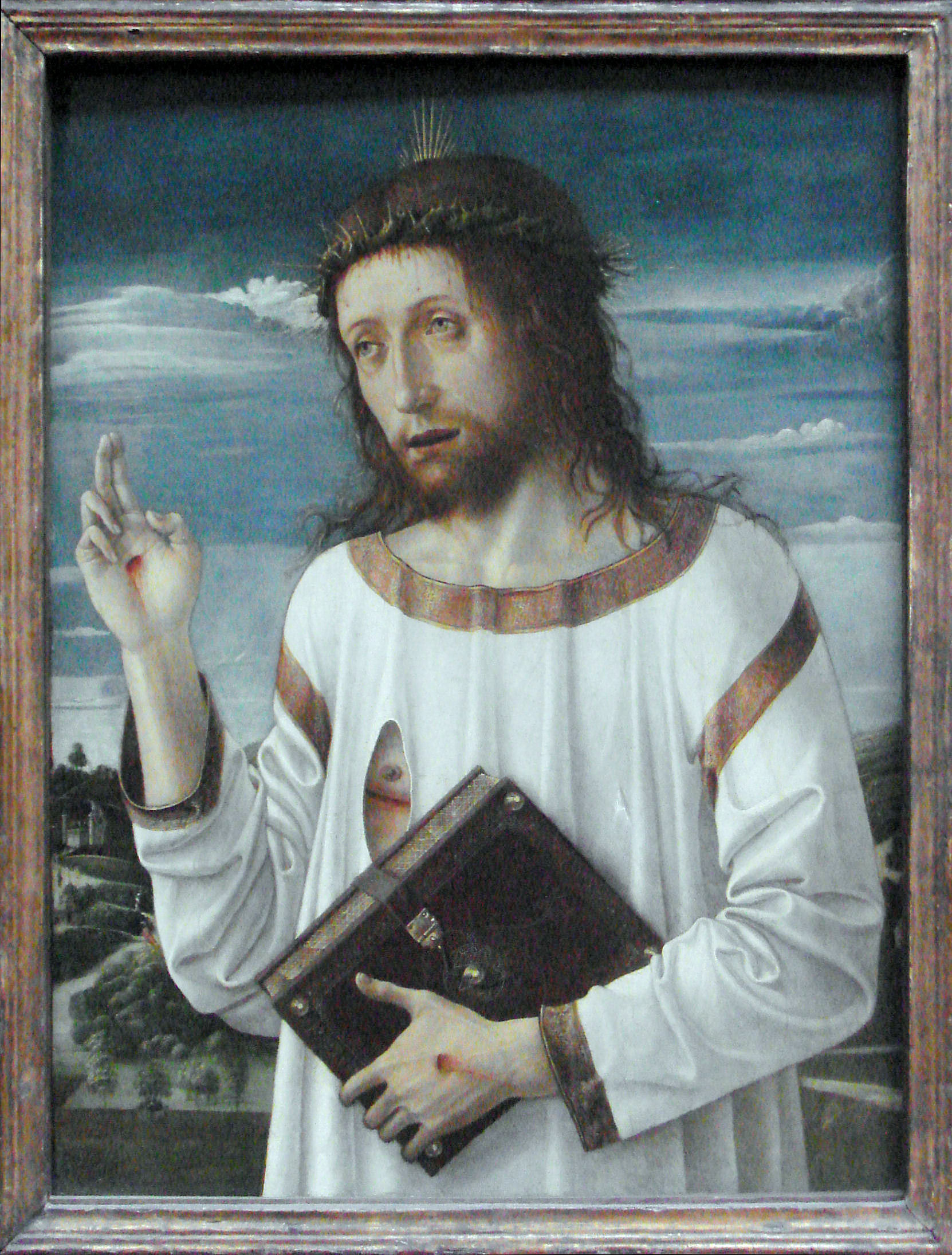
- Artist: Giovanni Bellini
- Year: 1460
- Medium: tempera on panel
- Dimensions: 58 cm × 44 cm (23 in × 17 in)
- Location: Louvre, Paris
- Website: Catalogue entry

Christ Blessing is a tempera painting on panel by the Italian artist Giovanni Bellini. It is usually dated to the early 1460s, that is, in the middle of Bellini's Mantegnese phase. It is now in the Louvre in Paris.

It is probably the painting mentioned by the historian Carlo Ridolfi as an "Effigy of the Saviour" in the Augustinian monastery of Santo Stefano Church in Venice. Antonio Morassi is the only art historian to demur from this consensus, instead identifying the painting seen by Ridolfi with a painting in a Swiss private collection dating to 1500.

The hem details are an example of pseudo-kufic decoration, which imitates Arabic script.

== See also ==
- List of works by Giovanni Bellini
