= Pietà (Titian) =

1576 painting by Titian

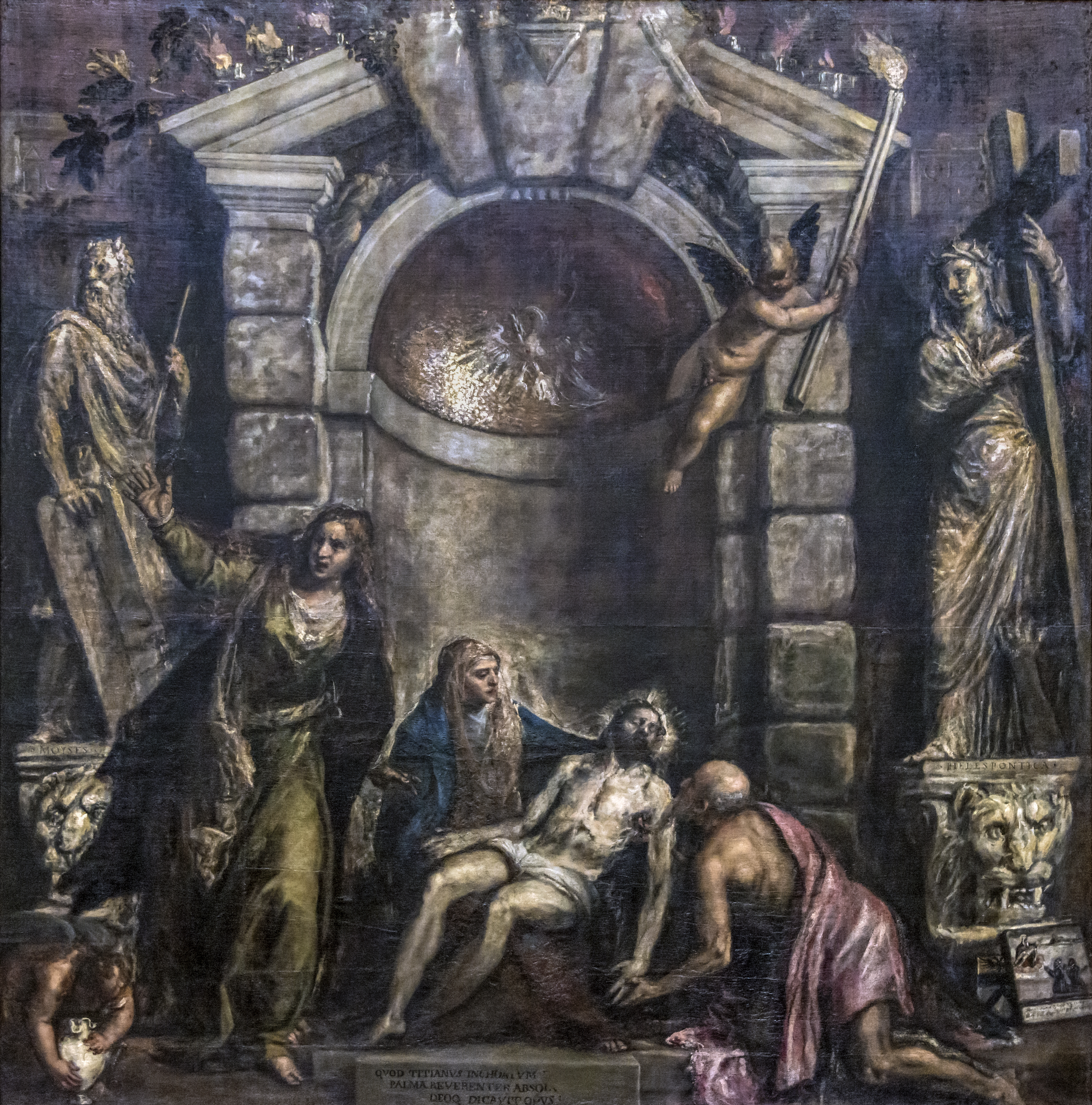
- Artist: Titian
- Year: 1575–1576
- Medium: Oil on canvas
- Dimensions: 389 cm × 351 cm (153 in × 138 in)
- Location: Gallerie dell'Accademia, Venice

The Pietà is an oil on canvas painting, one of the last paintings by Titian, from 1575-1576. In its final, extended state it was left incomplete at his death, in 1576, to be completed by Palma Giovane. Titian had intended it to hang over his grave, and the two stages of painting were to make it fit in two different churches. It is now in the Gallerie dell'Accademia, in Venice.

The painting is Titian's last, left unfinished at his death. An inscription in the lower part of the painting records that it was finished by Palma Giovane, whose interventions seem to have been kept to the minimum necessary, and doing his best to match Titian's own style. A minimalist view of the areas he worked on is that it "was limited to the angel with the torch and to touching up the tympanum of the stone shrine", but the statue of Saint Helena and Jerome's cloak have also been suspected of showing his hand, and he may have touched up the architecture more generally.

The painting is one of a group in Titian's distinctive late style, which begins fully about 1570, though continuing trends seen in earlier works as far back as the mid-1550s. He often kept paintings in the studio for a long period, with several probably unfinished at his death in 1576. His brushwork becomes bold, but imprecise and impressionistic, and worked over many times, as recorded in a famous description by Palma Giovane. The distinction between forms and the space between them almost disappears, and "The forms emerge like wraiths out of the circumambient darkness, and mass is reduced to a flickering pattern of colour and light. In his last years only these elements had reality for Titian."

There is a long-running argument about which of the works of the 1570s have been completed, and by whom. In this case, the main group of the Pietà, in its first form, is known to have been delivered by Titian as finished, and the full expanded composition to have been finished by Palma Giovane. Other important paintings of the 1570s are Tarquin and Lucretia, which was delivered in 1571, the Saint Jerome delivered in 1575, and the Flaying of Marsyas, The Death of Actaeon, the Hermitage Museum's Saint Sebastian and the Crowning with Thorns in Munich, all of which were probably in his studio at his death.

== Description ==
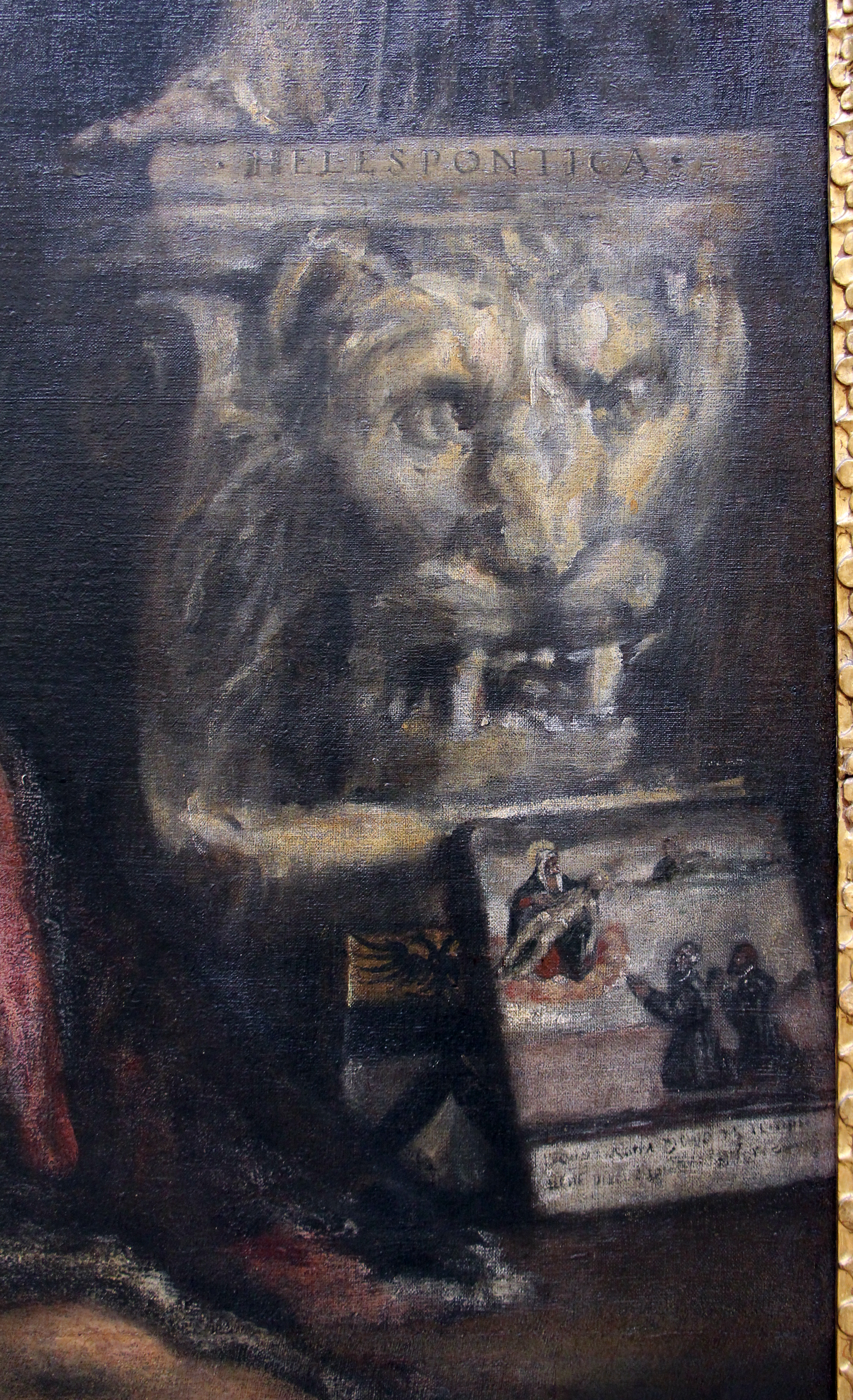
The bottom right-hand corner

An original, much smaller, composition just showing the basic two figures of the standard Pietà subject in Christian art, which consists of Virgin Mary cradling the dead body of Christ, was expanded after being completed and delivered (see below).

Behind the central figures there is now a large rusticated Mannerist aedicule or niche, flanked by statues standing on plinths carved with giant lion heads. Along the top of the broken pediment six flaming lamps give a dull light, with another half-hidden in the centre, with vegetation around them, perhaps "the fig leaves of the Fall of Man". A patch of dark sky can be seen at top left. Three massive keystone-like blocks in the centre drop below even the bottom of the pediment, a feature typical of the Mannerist architecture of Giulio Romano and his followers. These three blocks have been said to represent the Holy Trinity, or "Christ as foundation of the faith".

A figure who is either the Nicodemus of the gospels or, as usually thought today, Saint Jerome, approaches Christ on his knees, and reaches out to touch his hand. This is generally agreed to be a self-portrait of Titian. On the left, standing and completing a right-angled triangle of the human figures, is Mary Magdalene, who unlike the other figures seems to be in motion. Whether she has just arrived on the scene, or is rushing away in horror is unclear.

The two statues at the sides of the grand niche in the background are Moses on the left and the Hellespontine Sibyl on the right, both identified by inscriptions on their pedestals. The Sibyl was thought to have prophesied the coming of Christ and his crucifixion and she usually is represented holding a book. Some references will identify the figure of the woman as Saint Helena who is associated with finding the true cross, but they are not the same woman. Differences between the imagery and the inscription have led to different identifications.

A putto-angel with a flaming torch illuminates the scene, which is dark and evidently set at night. In particular his torch reveals the gold mosaic in the semi-dome of the niche, where in the centre a pelican feeds its young by pecking its own breast to draw blood, a phenomenon believed since classical times in traditional zoology, which had become a common visual symbol of the Passion of Christ and its redemptive effects for man.

In the bottom right corner a small ex voto picture is propped up against the base of the right-hand statue. It shows two men kneeling in prayer to a Pietà in the air. These are agreed to represent Titian and his son Orazio, probably praying to be spared from the plague that in fact killed them both, a full year after it arrived in Venice. Behind the picture, and partly concealed by it, is a small shield with Titian's coat of arms. In the bottom left corner another young angel is picking up an urn, perhaps the Magdalene's attribute of a jar of ointment.

== History ==
Titian had always intended to be buried in the church in Pieve di Cadore where he was baptized. He frequently visited the village, on the edge of Venetian territory in the mountains some 110 km almost due north of the city, although he had left the village for Venice more than 75 years before his death in 1576. Around 1572 a series of quarrels with the local authorities there and his relations led him to change his mind and plan a burial in the large Franciscan church of the Frari in Venice, which contained two of his important early masterpieces, the Assunta on the main altar and the Pesaro Altarpiece on a side wall, nearly opposite the intended site.

He chose a spot in a chapel with a famous crucifix in it and made the Pietà for it, presenting it to the church. He thought he had an agreement with the friars, but it emerged that they would not move the crucifix, and hung the painting in another chapel. Titian was furious, and eventually got the papal nuncio in Venice to instruct the friars to return the painting to him, in a decree of 1 March 1575. Titian now planned once again to be buried in the church in Pieve di Cadore, with the painting over the high altar, and once the painting was back in his studio he extended it to fit the space there.

In 1576 Titian died in the middle of a major epidemic of plague, followed a few days later by his son Orazio, and it was impossible to arrange for the transportation of the body to Cadore. He was at least not buried in one of the mass-graves used for most of the dead, but quietly carried to the Frari and buried there. The painting would probably have been taken to Cadore if Orazio had survived the plague, but with his death the ownership of Titian's estate was disputed between various heirs, and it remained in Venice.

The painting was finished by Palma Giovane; it seems he only received it some years after Titian's death, and then had it in his studio for some years. He added an inscription recording his contribution below Christ. Only after Palma's death in 1628 did it finally hang in a church, but this was St Angelo in Venice, which was closed in 1810 and demolished in 1837. It entered the Gallerie dell'Accademia in 1814. The painting has achieved a presence in the Frari as it is one of the five religious paintings by Titian represented in marble reliefs on the large monument to him put up in the church in the 19th century, in the chapel where the painting was intended to hang.

== Matching the location ==
In the Frari the painting was intended to hang in the Cappella di Crocefisso ("Chapel of the Crucifix"), where Titian was buried, and where his monument now stands. Like his much earlier masterpiece, the Pesaro Altarpiece, which was diagonally across the church, the painting was designed to be viewed in passing by people moving through the huge church, as well as those stopping in front of it. Those entering at the back and moving forward would pass the painting on the second altar on their right, seeing the triangle of figures rising to a termination in Mary Magdalene. Indeed, she looks and gestures roughly in the direction of the Pesaro Altarpiece, further up the church on the other side, while the statues, both looking to the left at a sharper angle, have been seen as indicating the way to the Assunta on the high altar.

The expansion of the painting to fit the space in Cadore (see below) affected each edge of the painting. To the original two strips of canvas, sewn together, five more were added: one across the whole top, two at the sides, a thinner strip at the bottom, and a small piece at the bottom right corner.

== Analysis ==
For Tom Nichols, "Titian's dramatization of the conflicting emotions of those who witness Christ's death lends his painting its bleakly expressive power. His focus effectively breaks up the usual formal unity expected of a pietà, isolating its protagonists from each other to undermine more abstract possibilities of aesthetic harmony or more resolved theological meaning."

The Pietà was an unusual subject in Venice, and Titian's choice of it probably relates to Michelangelo's Florentine Pietà, also originally intended to decorate the artist's tomb, with a self-portrait as Nicodemus. Throughout Titian's career he had reflected the paragone, or argument over superiority in art, with works asserting the superiority of painting over sculpture, within painting of Venice over Florence, and "it is not difficult to read the radically pictorial quality of his Virgin and Child as a last attempt to defeat his great rival." Erwin Panofsky prefers to see it as "A lifelong rivalry, compounded of mutual respect as well as opposition, ended in a tribute paid by the survivor to his defunct antagonist — and doing honor to both".

There are also elements looking back to Titian's master Giovanni Bellini, for example the mosaic semi-dome, seen in Bellini's San Giobbe Altarpiece of c. 1487, now also in the Accademia.

According to Sydney J. Freedberg, it "is less a painting about Christian death and tragedy than a splendid and impassioned affirmation of both art and life. Its true protagonist is the Magdalene, salient in a radiance of green against a gold-shot background, who walks out of the picture into the real world, shouting, palpable, magnificent, and one with us in life. She illustrates a cry of grief, but makes the effect of pronouncement of victory.

In a contrasting 2015 reading, Natalia Di Bartolo interpreted the painting as the terminal point of Titian's spiritual and existential inquiry. In her account, the destabilized composition, the dissolution of form, the darkened palette and the elusive source of light give visual form to a profound crisis of faith. The kneeling old man, generally identified as Titian's self-portrait, approaches the sacred figures without receiving an answer: the Virgin does not respond, Christ is dead, and the Magdalene calls towards an absence. Di Bartolo therefore reads the work as an extreme meditation on death, the collapse of certainty and the terrifying possibility of nothingness.

== See also ==
- List of works by Titian
