= San Michele Arcangelo, Venice =

Demolished church in Venice

Coordinates: 45°26′2.23″N 12°19′55.07″E

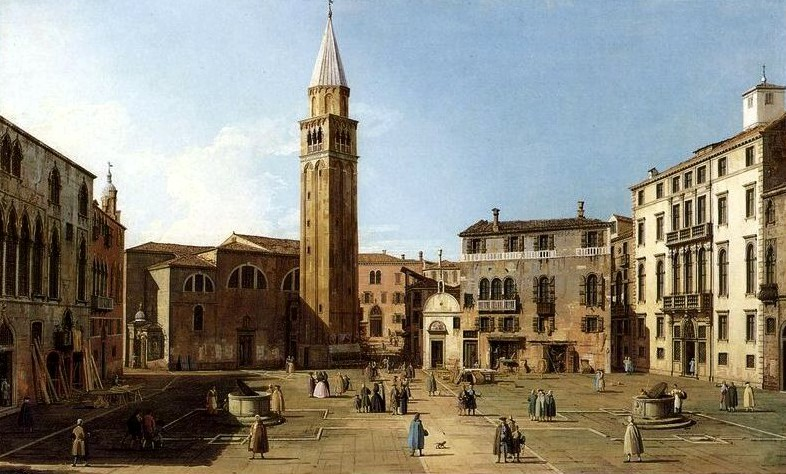
View of the Campo Sant'Angelo by Canaletto, showing San Michele Arcangelo with its campanile

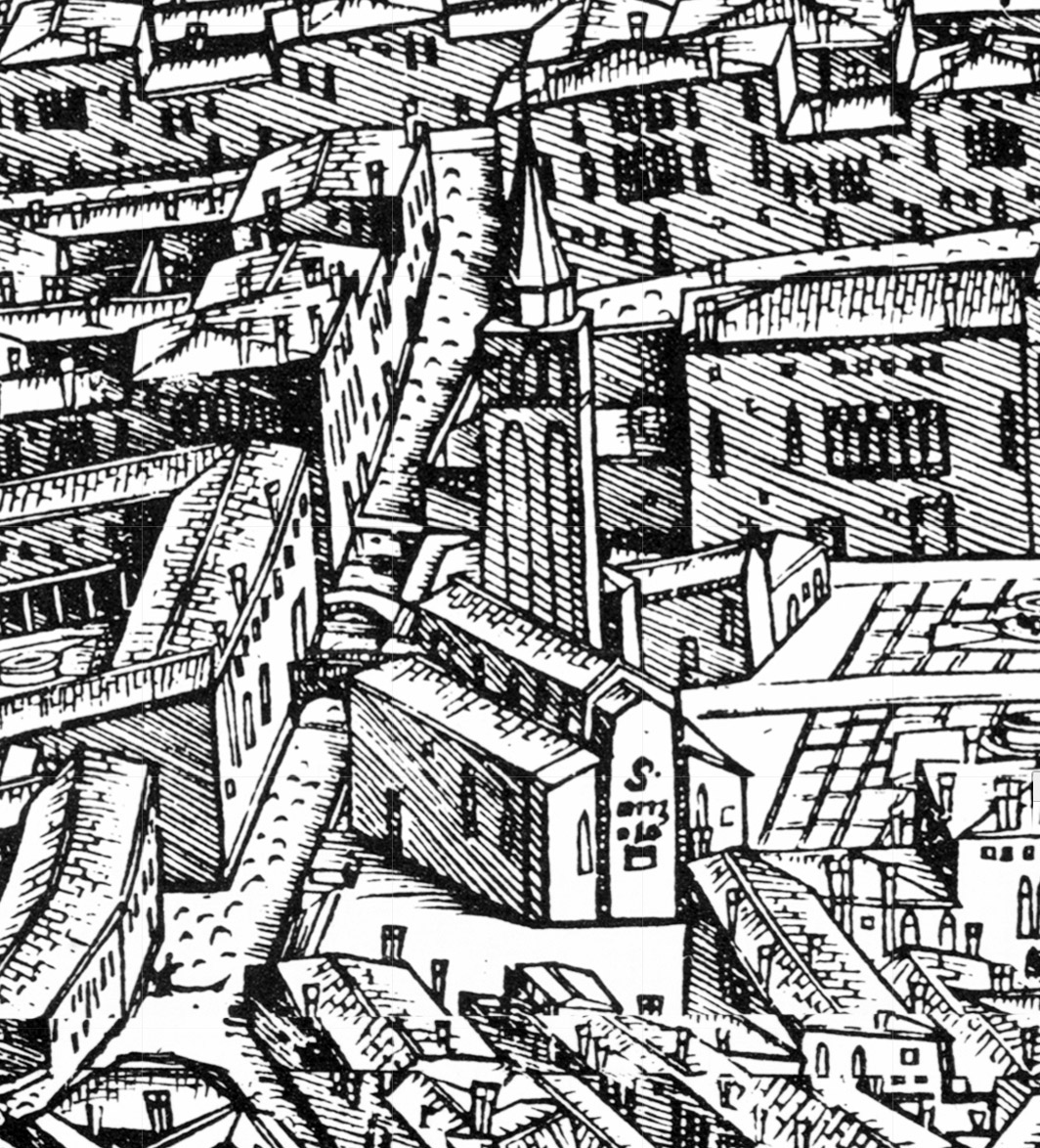
San Michele Arcangelo in the view of Venice by Jacopo de' Barbari, 1500

San Michele Arcangelo (Saint Michael the Archangel), known as Sant'Angelo or, in the Venetian dialect, Sant’Anzolo, was a church in Venice. Located in the sestiere of San Marco, in the square named for it, Campo Sant'Angelo, it was demolished in 1837.

== History ==
The church was founded in 920, originally dedicated to Saint Maurus; the oldest surviving documentary evidence dates to 1069. It underwent two fires and several modifications and reconstructions between the 15th and 17th centuries. It served as a parish and was affiliated with the Church of Santa Maria del Giglio.

In 1810, like many other sacred places in the city, it was closed for worship due to suppressions during Napoleon's rule as King of Italy. The parish was incorporated into the nearby parish of Santo Stefano; the building was used as a warehouse and demolished in 1837.

Today, no trace of the building remains, and nothing was built in its place; only the name survives in the name of the piazza.

== Architecture and artworks ==
San Michele Arcangelo stood in front of the monastery of the Santo Stefano, along the adjacent canal, with its facade facing the square. The facade was plain, with a central portal and three large semi-circular windows. The church had a tall campanile with a spire; three earlier campaniles had collapsed, the third collapsing with fatalities in 1455 shortly after the engineer and architect Aristotele Fioravanti had performed work to correct a worrying tilt.

Inside, the church housed nine altars. The Altare del Santissimo was transferred to Santo Stefano, and the high altar to the village church of Solimbergo. The last altarpiece by Titian, the Pietà, was intended by the artist to be placed above his tomb; it was bequeathed to San Michele Arcangelo by his pupil Palma Giovane and in 1814 was placed in the nearby Gallerie dell'Accademia.

== Burials ==
- Sebastiano Alcaini, Bishop of Belluno (1748–1803)
- Domenico Cimarosa
- Jacopo Pighetti, lawyer
