= Venetian polychoral style =

Style with choirs singing in alternation

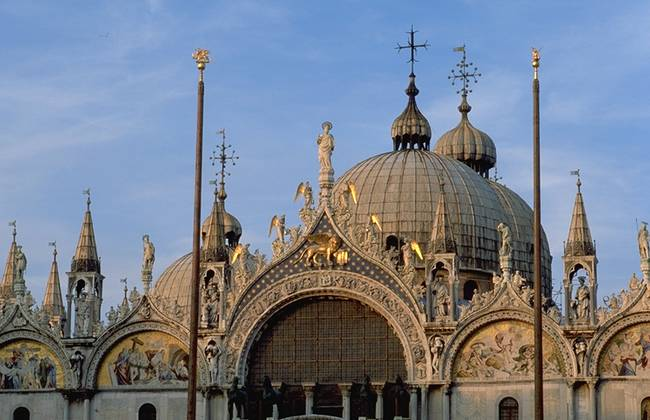
San Marco in the evening. The spacious, resonant interior of this building was an inspiration for the development of this musical style.

The Venetian polychoral style was a type of music of the late Renaissance and early Baroque eras which involved spatially separate choirs singing in alternation. It represented a major stylistic shift from the prevailing polyphonic writing of the middle Renaissance, and was one of the major stylistic developments which led directly to the formation of what is now known as the Baroque style. A commonly encountered term for the separated choirs is cori spezzati—literally, "broken choruses" as they were called, added the element of spatial contrast to Venetian music. These included the echo device, so important in the entire baroque tradition; the alternation of two contrasting bodies of sound, such as chorus against chorus, single line versus a full choir, solo voice opposing full choir, instruments pitted against voices and contrasting instrumental groups; the alternation of high and low voices; soft level of sound alternated with a loud one; the fragmentary versus the continuous; and blocked chords contrasting with flowing counterpoint.

Principle of duality, or opposing elements, is the basis for the stile concertato or concerted style, both words being derived from concertare, meaning "to compete with or to strive against." The word appears in the title of some works Giovanni published jointly with his uncle Andrea Gabrieli in 1587: Concerti...per voce at stromenti ("Concertos...for voices and instruments"). The term later came to be widely used, with such titles as Concerti Ecclesiastici (Church Concertos) appearing frequently.

== History of the style ==
External videos
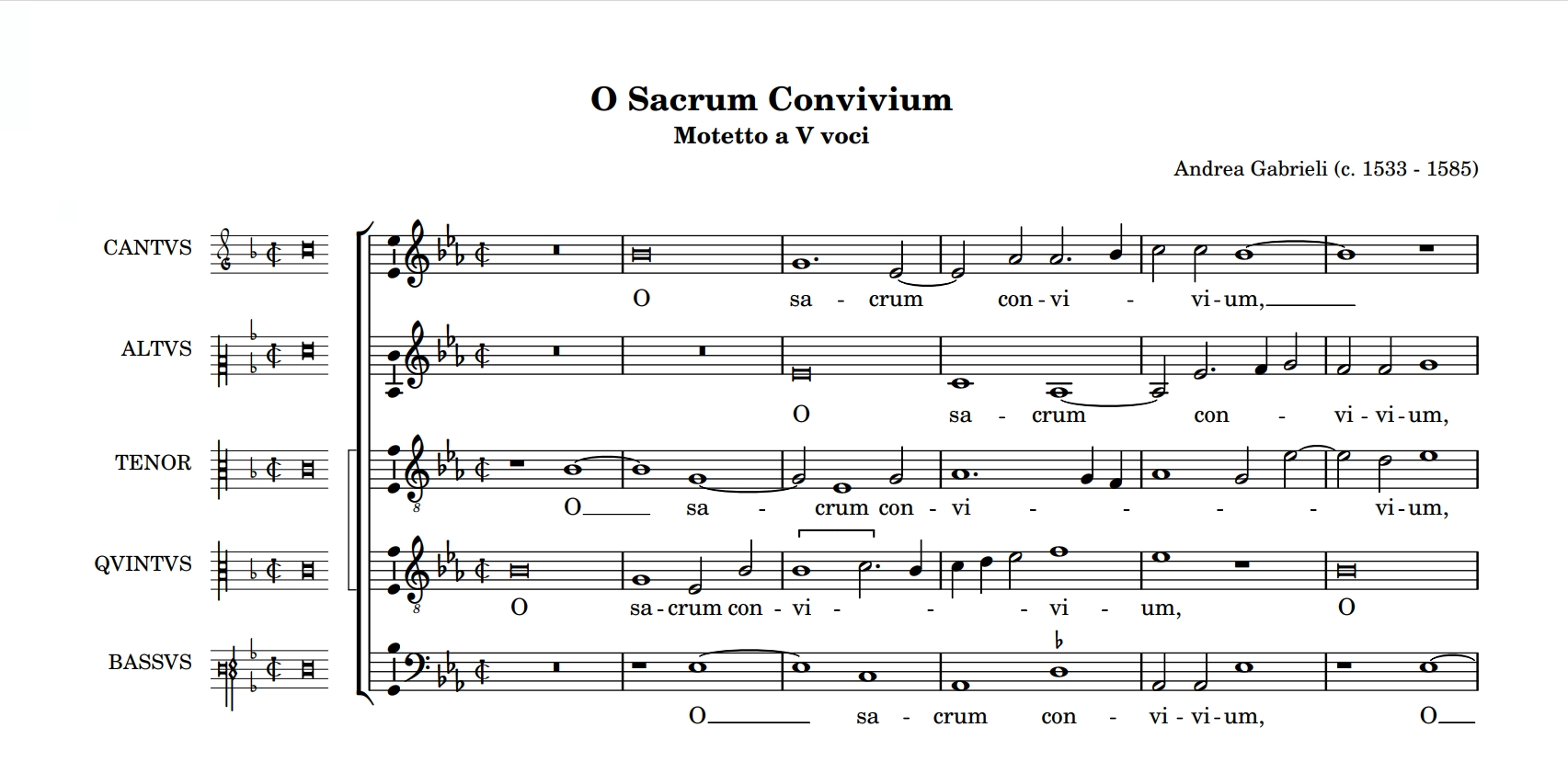
- Example of Venetian polychoral music
- 'O Sacrum Convivium, Sanctus & Benedictus' by Andrea Gabrieli, performed by Gabrieli Consort on You Tube

The style arose in Northern Italian churches in the sixteenth and seventeenth centuries, and proved to be a good fit for the architectural peculiarities of the imposing Basilica San Marco di Venezia in Venice. Composers such as Adrian Willaert, the maestro di cappella of St. Mark's in the 1540s, wrote antiphonal music, in which opposing choirs sang successive, often contrasting phrases of the music from opposing choir lofts, from specially constructed wooden platforms, and from the octagonal bigonzo across from the pulpit. This was a rare but interesting case of the architectural peculiarities of a single building encouraging the proliferation of a style which had become popular all over Europe, and helped define the shift from the Renaissance to the Baroque era. The idea of different groups singing in alternation contributed to the evolution of the stile concertato, which in its different instrumental and vocal manifestations eventually led to such diverse musical ideas as the chorale cantata, the concerto grosso, and the sonata.

The peak of development of the style was in the late 1580s and 1590s, while Giovanni Gabrieli was organist at San Marco and principal composer, and while Gioseffo Zarlino was still maestro di cappella. Gabrieli seems to have been the first to specify instruments in his published works, including large choirs of cornetti and sackbuts; he also seems to be one of the earliest to specify dynamics (as in his Sonata pian' e forte), and to develop the "echo" effects for which he became famous. The fame of the spectacular, sonorous music of San Marco at this time spread across Europe, and numerous musicians came to Venice to hear, to study, to absorb and bring back what they learned to their countries of origin. Germany, in particular, was a region where composers began to work in a locally modified form of the Venetian style—most notably Heinrich Schütz—though polychoral works were also composed elsewhere, such as the many masses written in Spain by Tomás Luis de Victoria.

After 1603, a basso continuo was added to the already considerable forces at San Marco—orchestra, soloists, choir—a further step toward the Baroque cantata. Music at San Marco went through a period of growth and decline, but the fame of the institution spread far. Although the repertoire eventually included music in the stile concertato, as well as the conservative stile antico, works in the polychoral style maintained a secure place in the San Marco repertoire into the 1800s.

== Representative seventeenth-century composers ==
- Adrian Willaert
- Cipriano de Rore
- Gioseffo Zarlino
- Claudio Merulo
- Giovanni Gabrieli
- Andrea Gabrieli
- Claudio Monteverdi
- Hans Leo Hassler
- Heinrich Schütz
- Francesco Cavalli

== Examples of the style ==
- Adrian Willaert, Salmi spezzati
- Andrea Gabrieli, Psalmi Davidici
- Andrea and Giovanni Gabrieli, Symphoniae sacrae
  - In Ecclesiis
  - Sonata pian' e forte
- Heinrich Schütz, Psalmen Davids (1619)
- Claudio Monteverdi, "Zefiro torna" ("Return, O Zephyr")

== See also ==
- Venetian School
