= Palazzo Trevisan Pisani =

Building in Venice, Italy

Coordinates: 45.43468°N 12.33172°E

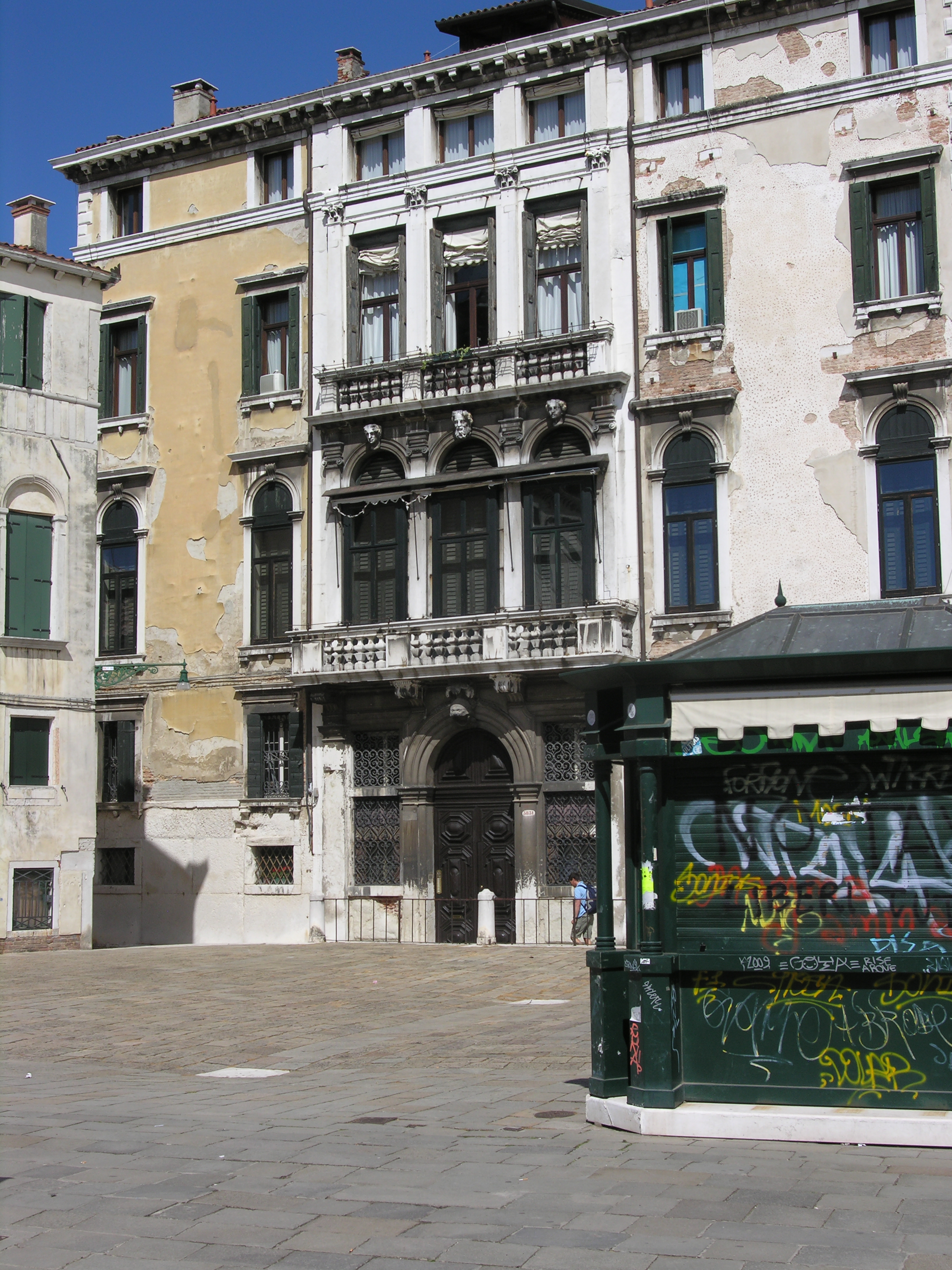
Palace Facade on Campo Sant'Angelo

The Palazzo Trevisan Pisani is a Renaissance-style palace situated in the Campo Sant'Angelo in the sestieri of San Marco in Venice, Italy.

The palace belonged originally to the Trevisan family, a branch of which lived in this parish in the fourteenth century. In 1661 it was occupied by Antonio and David Trevisan. By the early part of the eighteenth century it was owned and occupied by Benetto Pisani, whose grandson, also Benetto, died in 1781 leaving a daughter, married to Alvise Mocenigo of Casa Vecchia San Samuele, and no male heir. The palace was sold, and in 1808, the palace the joint property of Giovanni Sacogna and Giovanni Brijovich.
