= Hodie Christus natus est =

Gregorian chant; name shared by several other musical works

Hodie Christus natus est (Latin for "Today Christ is born") is a Gregorian chant sung at Christmas. It exists in various versions.

The words are also the title of various sacred works:

- a mass by Giovanni Pierluigi da Palestrina
- a motet by Giovanni Gabrieli
- a motet by Jan Pieterszoon Sweelinck
- a motet by Francis Poulenc
