= Sonata pian' e forte =

1597 composition by Giovanni Gabrieli

Sonata pian' e forte was composed by Italian composer and organist Giovanni Gabrieli and published in 1597. This is one of the earliest known pieces of music to specify loud and quiet passages in print. A known earlier piece is Adriano Banchieri's La organistina bella in echo published in 1596.

== Description ==
The title Sonata pian’e forte refers to an instrumental piece that uses soft and loud dynamics. The piece is an example of the Venetian polychoral style, which developed in sixteenth-century northern Italy, and found particular favor at St Mark's Basilica due to its two opposing choir lofts, one on each side of the main altar, allowing for spatially separated groups of musicians.

The term "sonata" at this time in Baroque music referred specifically to a work originally conceived for instruments, as opposed to those based on vocal works. It was most probably intended for a Catholic service in Venice at either St Mark's or the Scuola Grande di San Rocco. It is written for eight instruments divided into two groups of four players, spatially separated: cornetto, 3 sackbuts (group 1); viola, 3 sackbuts (group 2).

== Form ==
Gabrieli's Sonata pian ’e forte is a through-composed work, the structure of which is defined by dialogue between the two instrumental choirs. The formal division into an initial section (mm. 1–31), a longer, relatively complex middle section (mm. 31–71) and a final section (mm. 71–81) conforms to the conventions prevalent at the time.

The overall form can be represented as follows:

- Mm. 1–14: Antecedent in choir 1 (piano) / 14 measures / G Dorian
- Mm. 14–25: Consequent in choir 2 (piano) / 12 measures / G Dorian with harmonic excursions into D major (m. 17) and F major (m. 21)
- Mm. 26–31: Both choirs tutti (forte) / 6 measures / C Mixolydian
- Mm. 31–71: Antiphonal middle section (continual alternation between piano and forte) / 40 measures total, divided into 12 + 12 + 8 + 8 measures; structured into phrases of differing lengths: 4 measures (mm. 31–34), 2 measures (mm. 37/38) or 1 measure (m. 59) / continually modulating
- Mm. 71–81: Final section (piano, then forte) / 11 measures / cadence in G Dorian

Within the each section there are frequent examples of phrase elision, such as in m. 14, where the cadence of the first choir overlaps with the entrance of the second choir. Individual phrases often begin or end on weak beats within the measure.
