= Campo Sant'Angelo =

Coordinates: 45°26′03″N 12°19′55″E

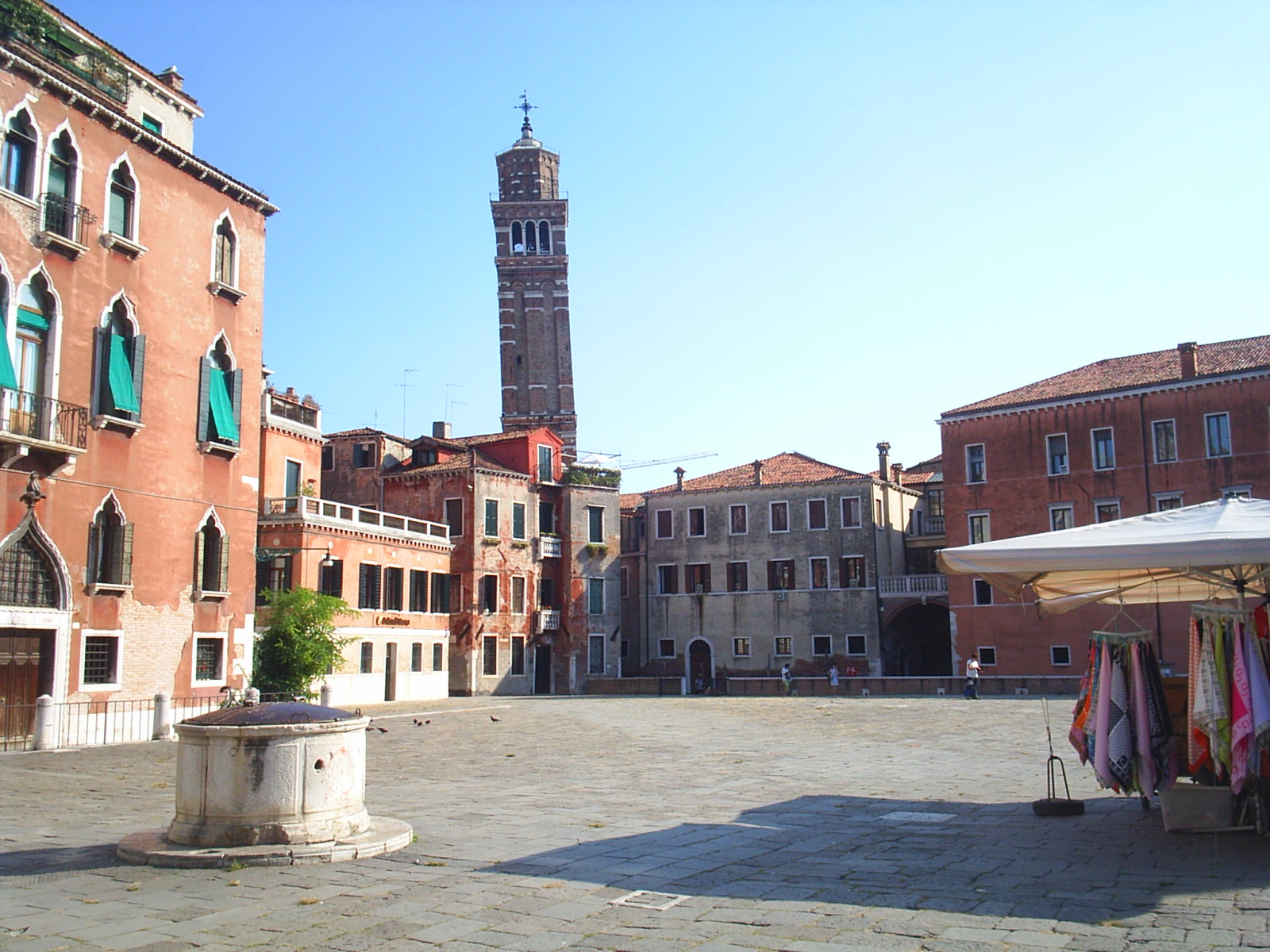
Facing South across the square, with bell-tower of Santo Stefano rising nearby, the convent on the right.

Campo Sant'Angelo, also known as Campo Sant'Anzolo, is a city square in the sestiere of San Marco, in the city of Venice, Italy.

The piazza is asymmetric, and bounded on the South-West by the Rio di San Anzolo, across which stands the former monastery of Santo Stefano. It preserves the name of the Church of St. Michael the Archangel or St. Angelo, which stood opposite the monastery but was demolished in 1837.

In the piazza is a small building, the 10th-century Oratorio di Sant'Angelo degli Zoppi, once allied to a school for the crippled. The bounds of the piazza include the Palazzo Trevisan Pisani, the Palazzo Gritti Morosini, and the Palazzo Duodo a Sant'Angelo. In this latter palace, the composer Domenico Cimarosa died while in exile from the Kingdom of Naples.

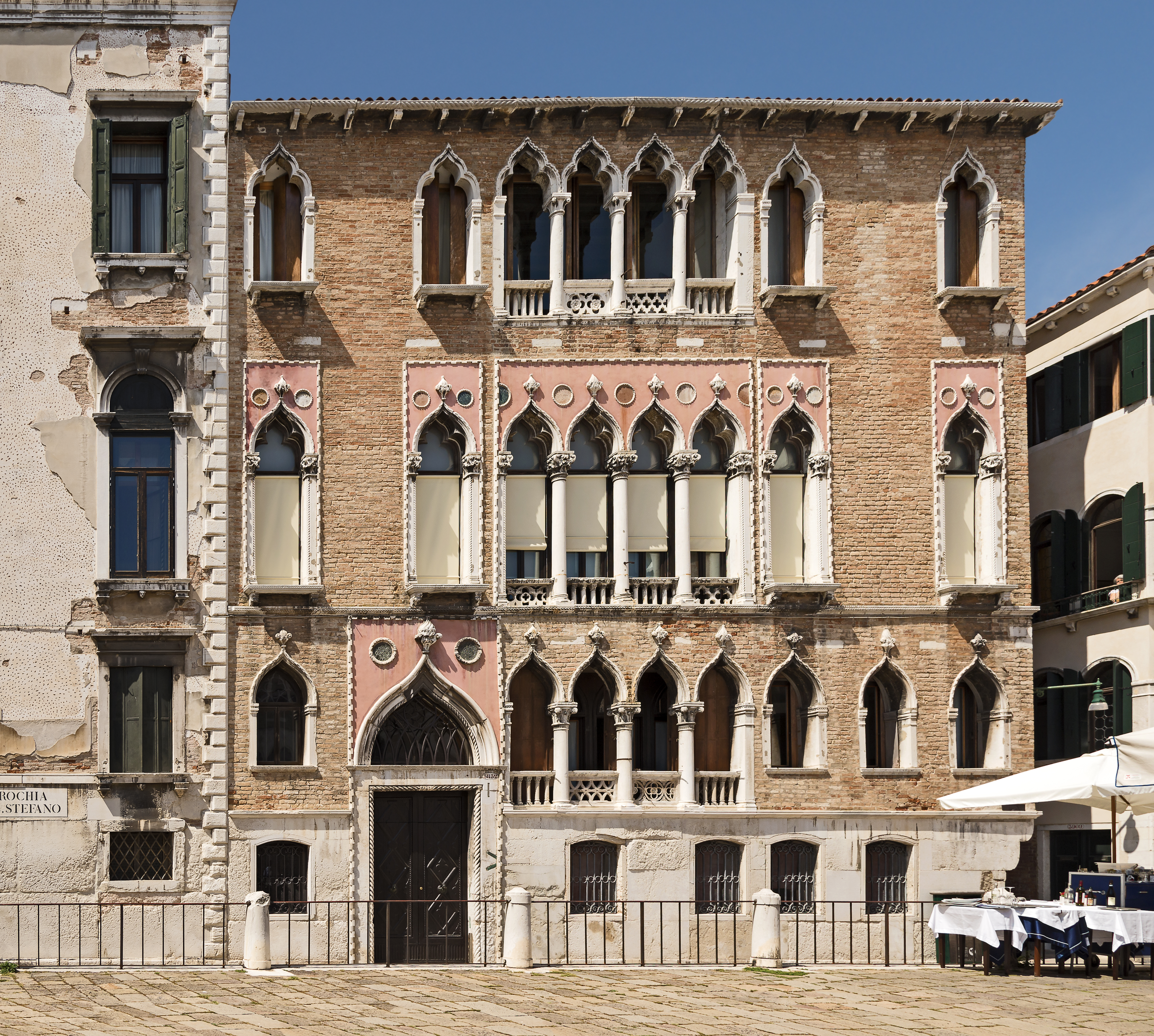
Palazzo Gritti Morosini

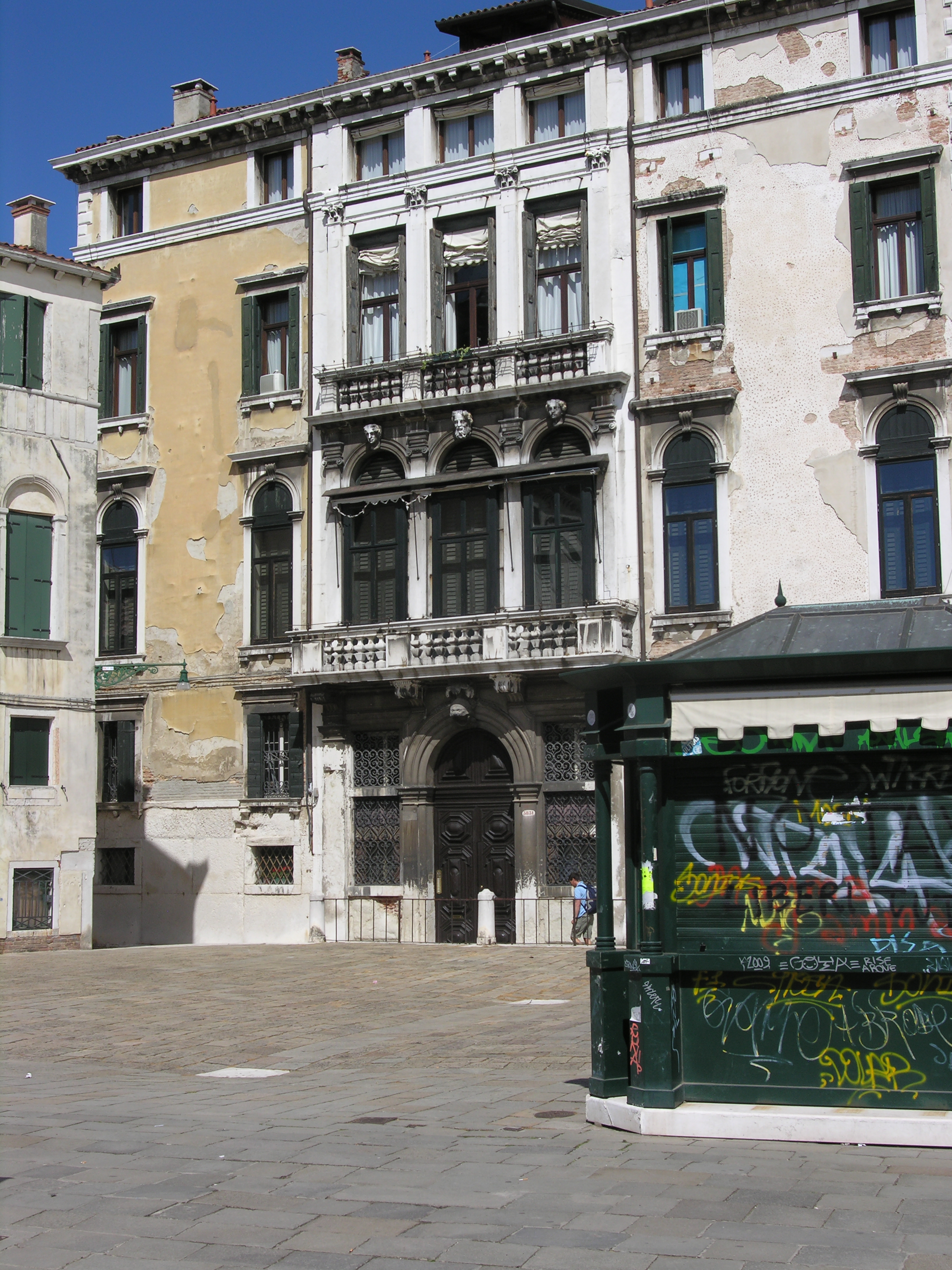
Palazzo Trevisan Pisani

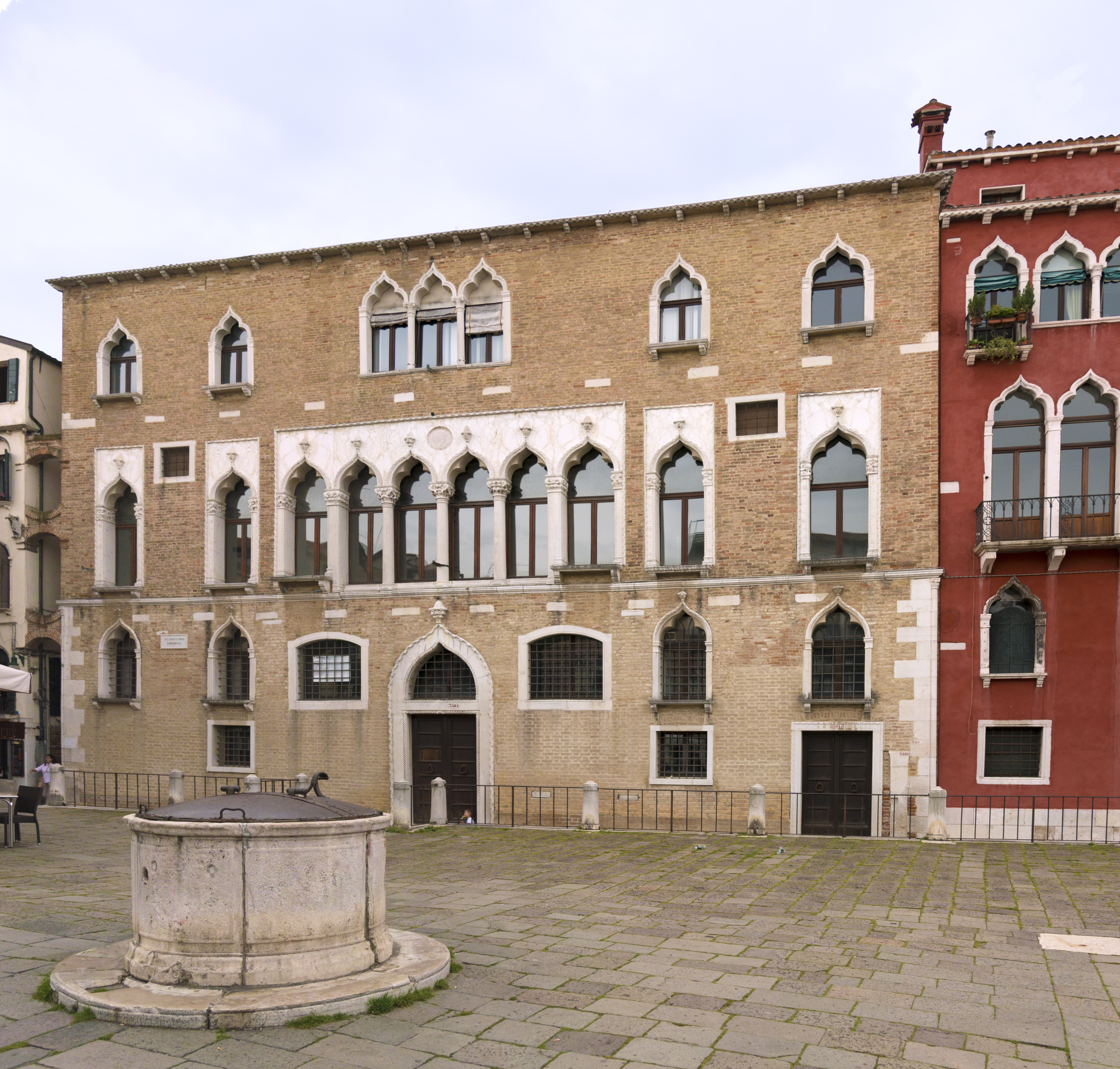
Palazzo Duodo a Sant'Angelo and one of the two well heads

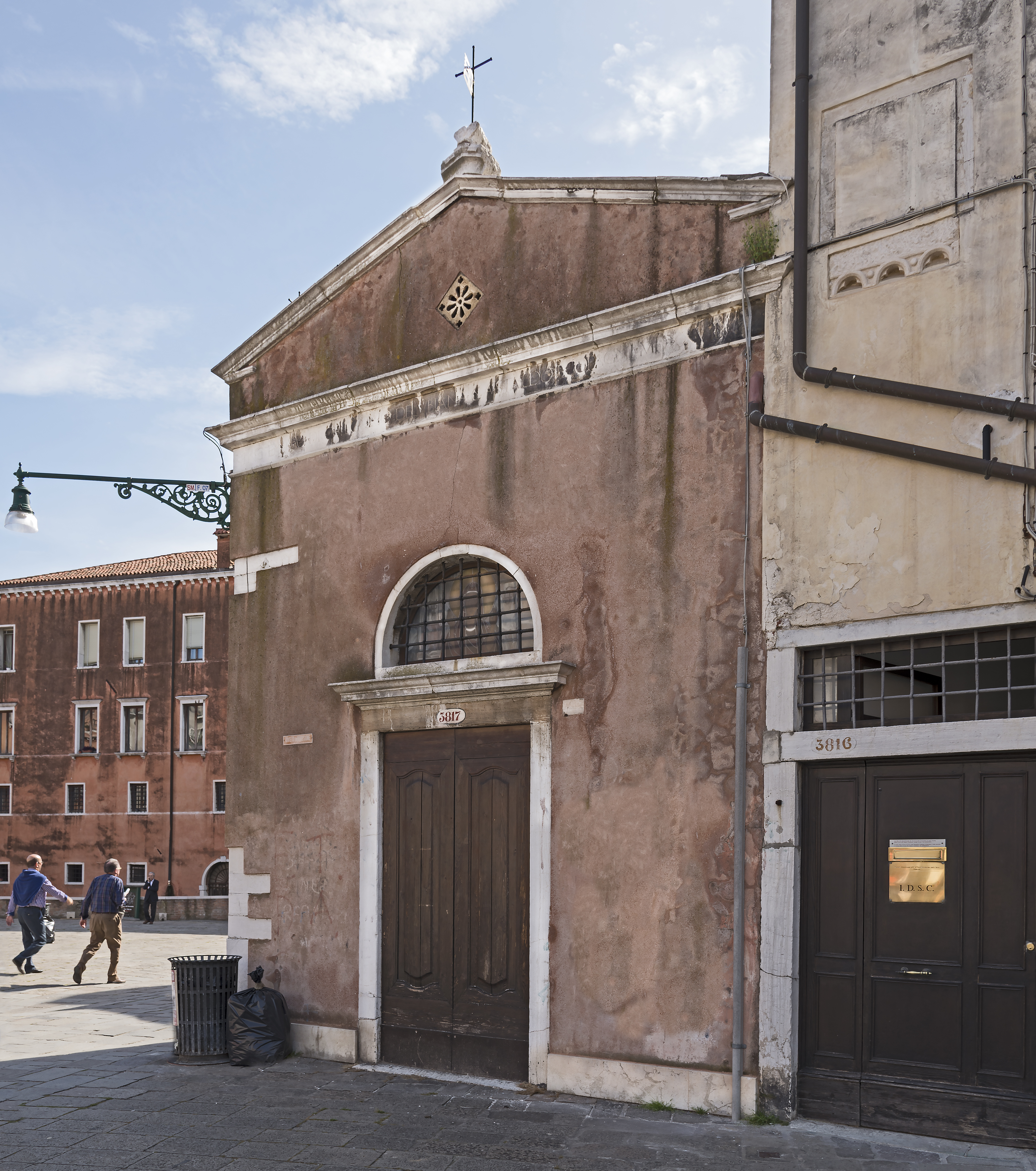
Oratory of the Annunziata

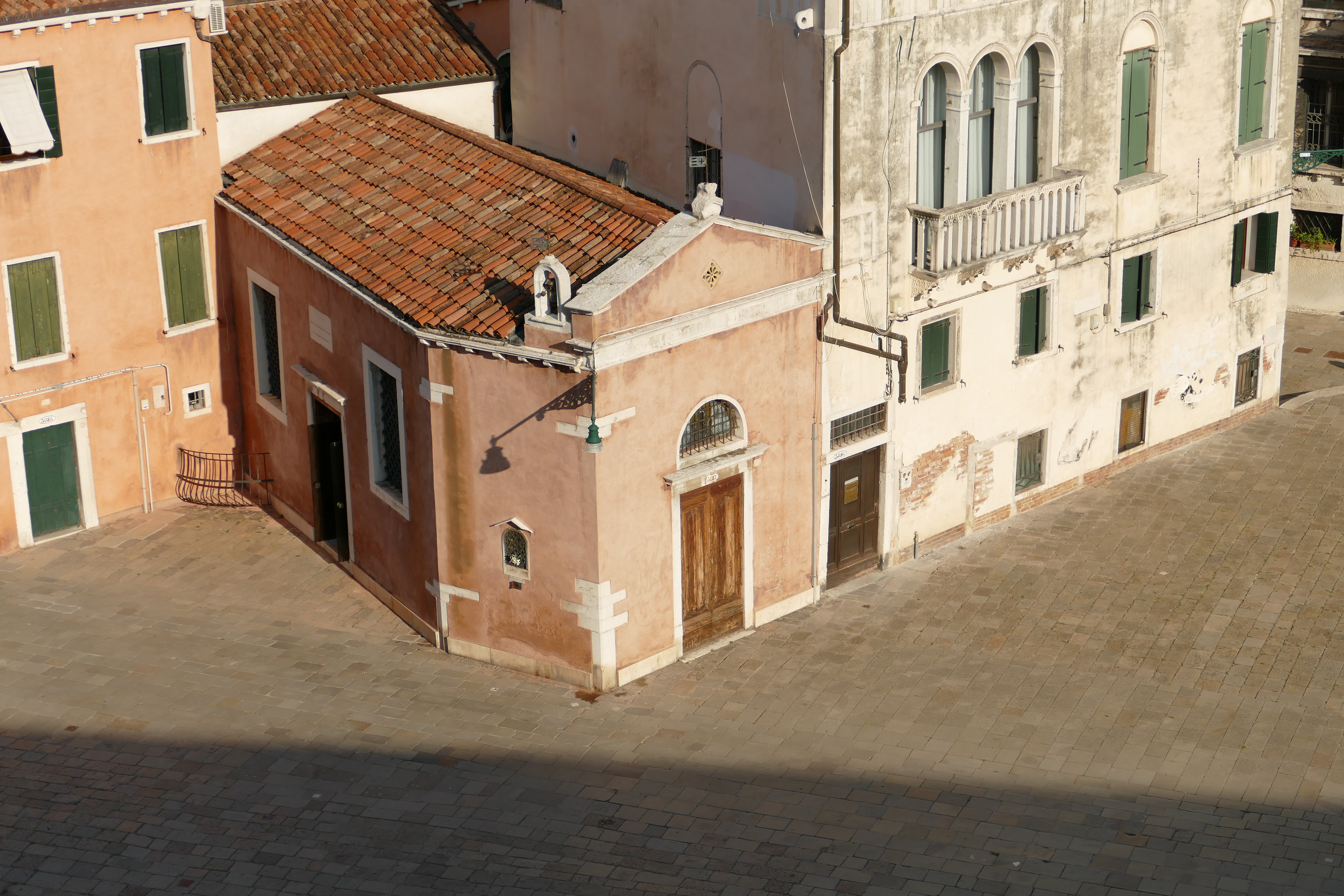
Oratory of the Annunziata
