= Giovanni Gabrieli =

Italian composer (c. 1554/1557–1612)

- Born: c. 1554/1557; Venice, Republic of Venice
- Died: 12 August 1612 (aged approx. 55 or 58); Venice, Republic of Venice
- Burial place: Santo Stefano, Venice
- Education: Court of Albert V, Duke of Bavaria
- Occupations: Composer; organist
- Years active: 1584–c. 1606
- Notable work: Sacrae symphoniae; Sonata pian' e forte; In ecclesiis
- Style: Renaissance; early Baroque
- Movement: Venetian School
- Relatives: Andrea Gabrieli (uncle)

Giovanni Gabrieli (c. 1554/1557 – 12 August 1612) was an Italian composer and organist. He was one of the most influential musicians of his time, and represents the culmination of the style of the Venetian School, at the time of the shift from Renaissance to Baroque idioms.

== Early life and education ==
Gabrieli was born in Venice. He was one of five children, and his father came from the region of Carnia and went to Venice shortly before Giovanni's birth. While not much is known about Giovanni's early life, he probably studied with his uncle, the composer Andrea Gabrieli, who was employed at St Mark's Basilica from the 1560s until his death in 1585. Giovanni may indeed have been brought up by his uncle, as is implied by the dedication to his 1587 book of concerti, in which he described himself as "little less than a son" to his uncle.

Giovanni also went to Munich to study with the renowned Orlando de Lassus at the court of Duke Albert V; most likely he stayed there until about 1579. Lassus was to be one of the principal influences on the development of his musical style.

== Career ==
By 1584, he had returned to Venice, where he became principal organist at St Mark's Basilica in 1585, after Claudio Merulo left the post; following his uncle's death the following year he took the post of principal composer as well. Also, after his uncle's death, he began editing much of the older man's music, which would otherwise have been lost; Andrea evidently had had little inclination to publish his own music, but Giovanni's opinion of it was sufficiently high that he devoted much of his own time to compiling and editing it for publication.

Gabrieli's career rose further when he took the additional post of organist at the Scuola Grande di San Rocco, another post he retained for his entire life. San Rocco was the most prestigious and wealthy of all the Venetian confraternities, and second only to San Marco itself in the splendour of its musical establishment. Some of the most renowned singers and instrumentalists in Italy performed there and a vivid description of its musical activity survives in the travel memoirs of the English writer Thomas Coryat. Much of his music was written specifically for that location, although he probably composed even more for San Marco.

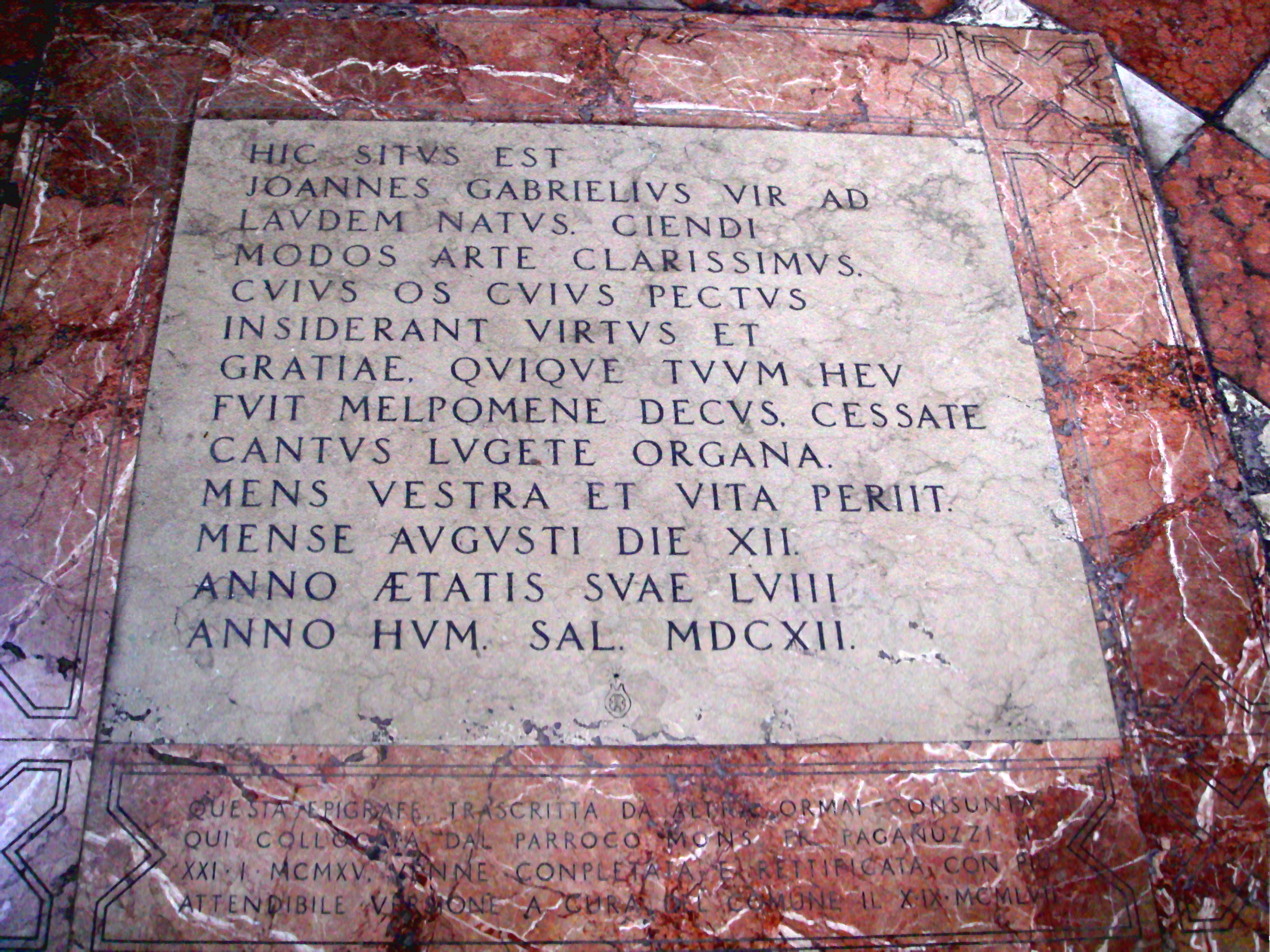
Tomb of Giovanni Gabrieli in Santo Stefano, Venice

San Marco had a long tradition of musical excellence and Gabrieli's work there made him one of the most noted composers in Europe. The vogue that began with his influential volume Sacrae symphoniae (1597) was such that composers from all over Europe, especially from Germany, came to Venice to study. Evidently, he also instructed his new pupils to study the madrigals being written in Italy, so not only did they carry back the grand Venetian polychoral style to their home countries, but also the more intimate style of madrigals; Heinrich Schütz and others helped transport the transitional early Baroque music north to Germany, a trend that decisively affected subsequent music history. The productions of the German Baroque, culminating in the music of J.S. Bach, were founded on this strong tradition, which had its roots in Venice.

== Illness and death ==
Gabrieli was increasingly ill after about 1606, at which time church authorities began to appoint deputies to take over duties he could no longer perform. He died in 1612 in Venice, of complications from a kidney stone.

== Music and style ==
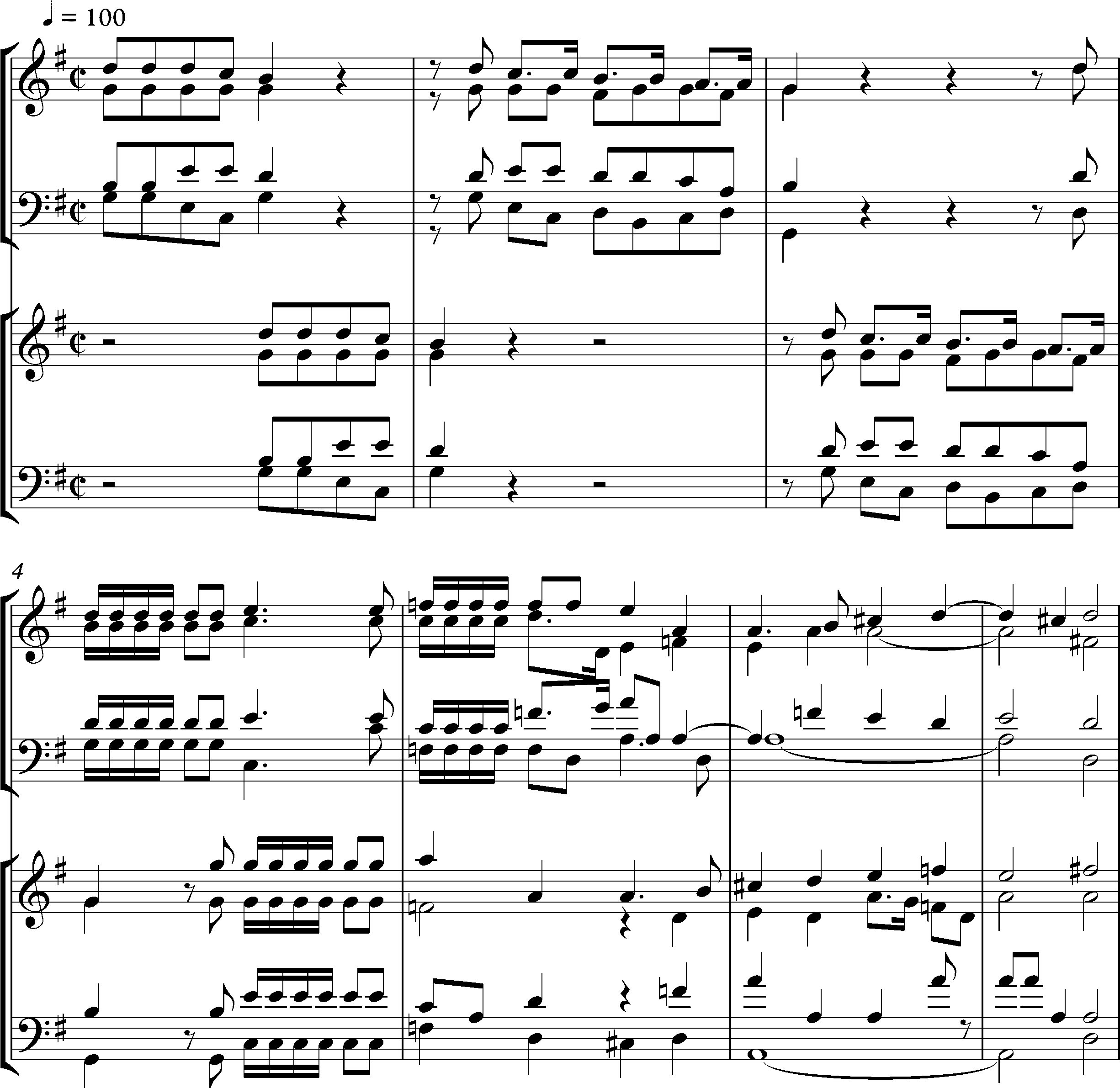
Canzon Septimi Toni No. 2, a piece for two antiphonal choirs of four instruments each; original instruments unspecified, but often played with eight trombones. Synthesized sound:

Though Gabrieli composed in many of the forms current at the time, he preferred sacred vocal and instrumental music. All of his secular vocal music was relatively early in his career; he never wrote lighter forms, such as dances; and later he concentrated on sacred vocal and instrumental music that exploited sonority for maximum effect. Among the innovations credited to him – and while he was not always the first to use them, he was the most famous of his period to do so – were dynamics; specifically notated instrumentation (as in the famous Sonata pian' e forte); and massive forces arrayed in multiple, spatially separated groups, an idea which was to be the genesis of the Baroque stile concertato, and which spread quickly to northern Europe, both by the report of visitors to Venice and by Gabrieli's students, who included Hans Leo Hassler and Heinrich Schütz.

Like composers before and after him, he would use the unusual layout of the San Marco church, with its two choir lofts facing each other, to create striking spatial effects. Most of his pieces are written so that a choir or instrumental group will first be heard on one side, followed by a response from the musicians on the other side; often there was a third group situated on a stage near the main altar in the centre of the church. While this polychoral style had been extant for decades (Adrian Willaert may have made use of it first, at least in Venice), Gabrieli pioneered the use of carefully specified groups of instruments and singers, with precise directions for instrumentation, and in more than two groups. The acoustics were and are such in the church that instruments, correctly positioned, could be heard with perfect clarity at distant points. Thus instrumentation which looks strange on paper, for instance, a single string player set against a large group of brass instruments, can be made to sound, in San Marco, in perfect balance. A fine example of these techniques can be seen in the scoring of In Ecclesiis.

Gabrieli's first motets were published alongside his uncle Andrea's compositions in his 1587 volume of Concerti. These pieces show much influence of his uncle's style in the use of dialogue and echo effects. There are low and high choirs and the difference between their pitches is marked by the use of instrumental accompaniment. The motets published in Giovanni's 1597 Sacrae Symphoniae seem to move away from this technique of close antiphony towards a model in which musical material is not simply echoed, but developed by successive choral entries. Some motets, such as Omnes Gentes developed the model almost to its limits. In these motets, instruments are an integral part of the performance, and only the choirs marked "Capella" are to be performed by singers for each part.

There seems to be a distinct change in Gabrieli's style after 1605, the year of publication of Monteverdi's Quinto libro di madrigali, and Gabrieli's compositions are in a much more homophonic style as a result. There are sections purely for instruments – called "Sinfonia" – and small sections for soloists singing florid lines, accompanied simply by a basso continuo. "Alleluia" refrains provide refrains within the structure, forming rondo patterns in the motets, with close dialogue between choirs and soloists. In particular, one of his best-known pieces, In Ecclesiis, is a showcase of such polychoral techniques, making use of four separate groups of instrumental and singing performers, underpinned by the omnipresent organ and continuo.

== Works ==
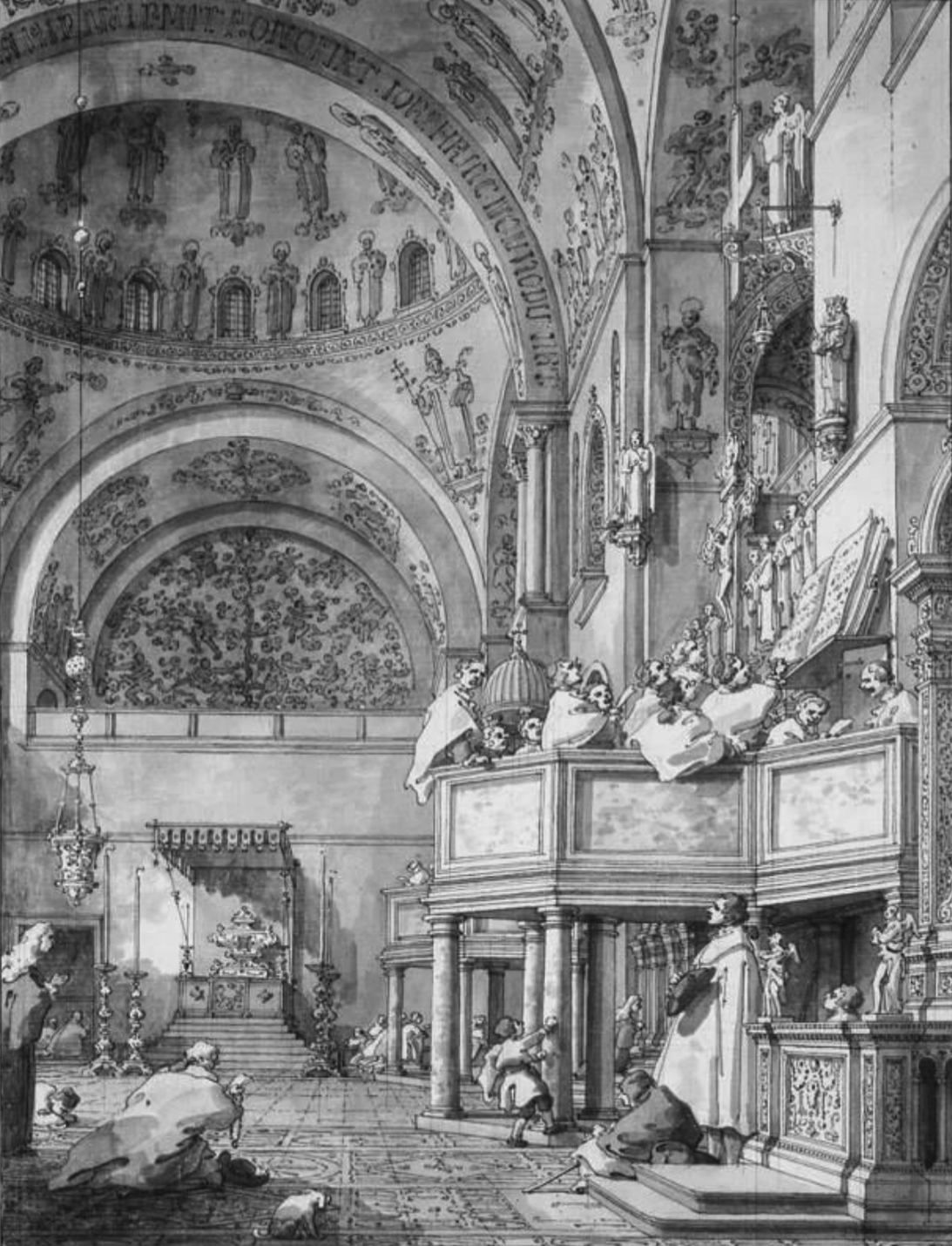
The choir in the 18th century

=== Concerti (1587) ===
'Concerti di Andrea, et di Giovanni Gabrieli, organisti della Serenissima Signori di Venetia': A collection of 77 works, the majority of which are by the uncle, Andrea Gabrieli, but also containing some of the younger Gabrieli's polychoral motets.

- 9.) Inclina Domine aurem a 6
- 19.) Ego dixi Domine a 7
- 33.) O magnum mysterium a 8
- 37.) Deus meus ad te de luce a 10
- 40.) Angelus ad pastores ait a 12
- 77.) Sacri di Giove augei a 12

=== Sacrae Symphoniae (1597) ===
A collection of: 45 motets for 6, 7, 8, 10, 12, 14, 15 or 16 voices; 14 canzonas in 8, 10, 12 or 15 musical lines; and two sonatas, one in 8 musical lines, the other in 12.

1. Motet "Cantate Domino" a 6, Ch.6
2. Exaudi Domine, justitiam meam, Ch.7
3. Motet "Beata es virgo Maria" a 6, Ch.8
4. Motet "Miserere mei Deus" (Psalm 51) a 6, Ch.9
5. O quam suavis est, Domine, Ch.10
6. Benedixisti Domine terram tuam, Ch.11
7. Motet "Exaudi Deus orationem meam" (Psalm 55) a 7, Ch.12
8. Motet "Sancta Maria succurre miseris" a 7, Ch.13
9. O Domine Jesu Christe, Ch.14
10. Domine exaudi orationem meam, Ch.15
11. Jubilate Deo, omnis terr, Ch.16
12. Misericordias Domin, Ch.17
13. Beati immaculati, Ch.18
14. Laudate nomen Domini, Ch.19
15. Jam non-dicam vos servos, Ch.20
16. Beati omnes, Ch.21
17. Domine, Dominus noster, Ch.22
18. Angelus Domini descendit, Ch.23
19. Motet "O Jesu mi dulcissime" a 8, Ch.24
20. Motet "Sancta et immaculata virginitas" a 8, Ch.25
21. Diligam te, Domine, Ch.26
22. Exultate justi in Domino, Ch.27
23. Hoc tegitur, Ch.28
24. Ego sum qui sum, Ch.29
25. In te Domine speravi, Ch.30
26. Jubilemus singuli, Ch.31
27. Magnificat, Ch.32
28. Canzon per sonar primi toni a 8, Ch.170
29. Canzon per sonar septimi toni a 8, Ch.171
30. Canzon per sonar septimi toni a 8, Ch.172
31. Canzon per sonar noni toni a 8, Ch.173
32. Canzon per sonar duodecimi toni a 8, Ch.174
33. Sonata pian e forte, Ch.175
34. Benedicam Dominum, Ch.33
35. Domine exaudi orationem meam, Ch.34
36. Motet "Maria virgo" a 10, Ch.35
37. Motet "Deus qui beatum Marcum" a 10, Ch.36
38. Surrexit Pastor bonus, Ch.37
39. Judica me, Domine, Ch.38
40. Quis est iste qui venit, Ch.39
41. Motet "Hodie Christus natus est" a 10, Ch.40
42. Canzon per sonar primi toni a 10, Ch.176
43. Canzon per sonar duodecimi toni a 10, Ch.177
44. Canzon per sonar duodecimi toni a 10, Ch.178
45. Canzon per sonar duodecimi toni a 10, Ch.179
46. Canzon in echo duodecimi toni à 10, Ch.180
47. Canzon sudetta accommodata per concertar con l’Organo a 10, Ch.181
48. Plaudite, psallite, jubilate Deo omnis terra, Ch.41
49. Virtute magna, Ch.42
50. Kyrie (primus), Ch.43
51. Christe, Ch.44
52. Kyrie (tertius), Ch.45 (Ch.43–45 are a single composition)
53. Gloria, Ch.46
54. Sanctus, Ch.47
55. Magnificat, Ch.48
56. Regina cœli, lætare, Ch.49
57. Canzon per sonar septimi & octavi toni a 12, Ch.182
58. Canzon per sonar noni toni a 12, Ch.183
59. Sonata octavi toni a 12, Ch.184
60. Nunc dimittis, Ch.50
61. Jubilate Deo, omnis terra, Ch.51
62. Canzon quarti toni a 15, Ch.185
63. Omnes gentes plaudite manibus, Ch.52

=== Canzoni per sonare (1608) ===
A collection of 36 short works by Gabrieli, Girolamo Frescobaldi, and others. The first four and the 27th and 28th are by Gabrieli.

- Canzon (I) a 4 "La spiritata", Ch.186
- Canzon (II) a 4, Ch.187
- Canzon (III) a 4, Ch.188
- Canzon (IV) a 4, Ch.189
- Canzon (XXVII) a 8 "Fa sol la re", Ch.190
- Canzon (XXVIII) a 8 "Sol sol la sol fa mi", Ch.191

=== Canzoni et sonate (written nlt. 1612, publ. 1615) ===
Collection of 16 canzoni and 5 sonate for 3, 5, 6, 7, 8, 10, 12, 14, 15 and 22 "voci, per sonar con ogni sorte di instrumenti, con il basso per l’organo (musical parts, to sound on all sorts of instruments, with bass by means of the organ)”. Published posthumously in 1615. (†)Note that numbering as published (Roman system) does not quite agree with the Charteris catalogue.

1. Canzon prima (item I) a 5, Ch.195
2. Canzon (II) a 6, Ch.196
3. Canzon (III) a 6, Ch.197
4. Canzon (IV) a 6, Ch.198
5. Canzon (V) a 7, Ch.199
6. Canzon (VI) a 7, Ch.200
7. Canzon (VII) a 7, Ch.201
8. Canzon (VIII) a 8, Ch.202
9. Canzon (IX)† a 8
10. Canzon (X)† a 8
11. Canzon (XI)† a 8
12. Canzon (XII) a 8, Ch.205
13. Sonata (item XIII) a 8, Ch.206
14. Canzon (item XIV) a 10, Ch.207
15. Canzon (XV) a 10, Ch.208
16. Canzon (XVI) a 12, Ch.209
17. Canzon (XVII) a 12, Ch.210
18. Sonata (item XVIII) a 14, Ch.211
19. Sonata (XIX) a 15, Ch.212
20. Sonata (XX) a 22, Ch.213
21. Sonata (XXI) per tre violini e basso (a 4), Ch.214

=== Sacrae Symphoniae II (written nlt. 1612, publ. 1615) ===
Sacrae symphoniae Liber secundus. Published posthumously in 1615.

1. Exultavit cor meum
2. Congratulamini mihi
3. Ego dixi Domine
4. Sancta et immaculata
5. O Jesu mi dulcissime
6. Hodie completi sunt
7. O quam suavis
8. Deus in nomine tuo
9. Attendite popule meus
10. Cantate Domino
11. Benedictus es Dominus
12. Litania Beatae Mariae Virginis
13. Deus Deus meus
14. Vox Domini
15. Iubilate Deo
16. Motet "Surrexit Christus" a 11, Ch.66
17. Exaudi Deus
18. O gloriosa virgo
19. Misericordia tua Domine
20. Suscipe clementissime Deus
21. Kyrie
22. Sanctus
23. Magnificat 12 vocum
24. Confitebor tibi Domine
25. Motet "Quem vidistis pastores" a 14
26. Motet "In ecclesiis" a 14
27. Magnificat 14 vocum
28. Salvator noster
29. O quam gloriosa
30. Exaudi me Domine
31. Magnificat 17 vocum
32. Buccinate

== Recordings ==
Liner notes often point out that Gabrieli took advantage of the architecture of St Mark's Basilica, which is undoubtedly true although some of his works were performed at the Scuola Grande di San Rocco. Various recordings of his works have been made at St Mark's. However, the acoustic presents challenges. The sound is affected by variables such as where the performers and audience are seated. There is a reverberation time (the amount of time it takes a sound to decay to inaudibility) of almost 7 seconds when the church is empty, although for Gabrieli some of the echo would have been absorbed by wall hangings and the congregation. An example of a substitute ecclesiastical location is Douai Abbey; it is reverberant but less problematic.

In 1969 American ensembles conducted by Vittorio Negri received awards in two categories at the 11th Annual Grammy Awards for music by Gabrieli. These Columbia recordings were made in St Mark's Basilica:

- Best Choral Performance (other than opera)
  - Vittorio Negri (conductor), George Bragg, Gregg Smith, (choir directors), E. Power Biggs, the Edward Tarr Ensemble, the Gregg Smith Singers & the Texas Boys Choir for The Glory of Gabrieli
- Best Chamber Music Performance
  - Vittorio Negri (conductor), E. Power Biggs & the Edward Tarr Ensemble for Glory of Gabrieli Vol. II - Canzonas for Brass, Winds, Strings and Organ

Goran Dragicevic, a Sydney-based artist, recorded an autonomous self-sung and produced version of Magnificat a 14 - one of Gabrieli's famous settings of the text. Originally composed for 14 voices split into 3 choirs, of which the orchestral accompaniment doubled the vocal parts, Goran's version is comprised solely with his own vocals, singing each line individually and layering them to create a complete 14 voice rendition. It was made possible by his wide vocal range.

The Gabrieli Consort and Players, a British group directed by Paul McCreesh, won a Gramophone Award for the album "Venetian Coronation" (released on Virgin Classics in 1990). This is a musical reconstruction of the coronation of Doge Marino Grimani and features music by Andrea and Giovanni Gabrieli. A revised version was released in 2012 on Winged Lion. The Gabrieli Consort and Players have also recorded Music for San Rocco (recorded in the Scuola Grande di San Rocco in 1995), featuring music by Giovanni Gabrieli. Federico Bardazzi released in 2018, Monteverdi & Gabrieli: Easter Celebration Venice 1600 with the Ensemble San Felice, Brilliant Classics, reconstructing the liturgical music performed in Venice during Easter celebrations around 1600.
