= Saint Sebastian (Titian, Hermitage) =

Painting by Titian

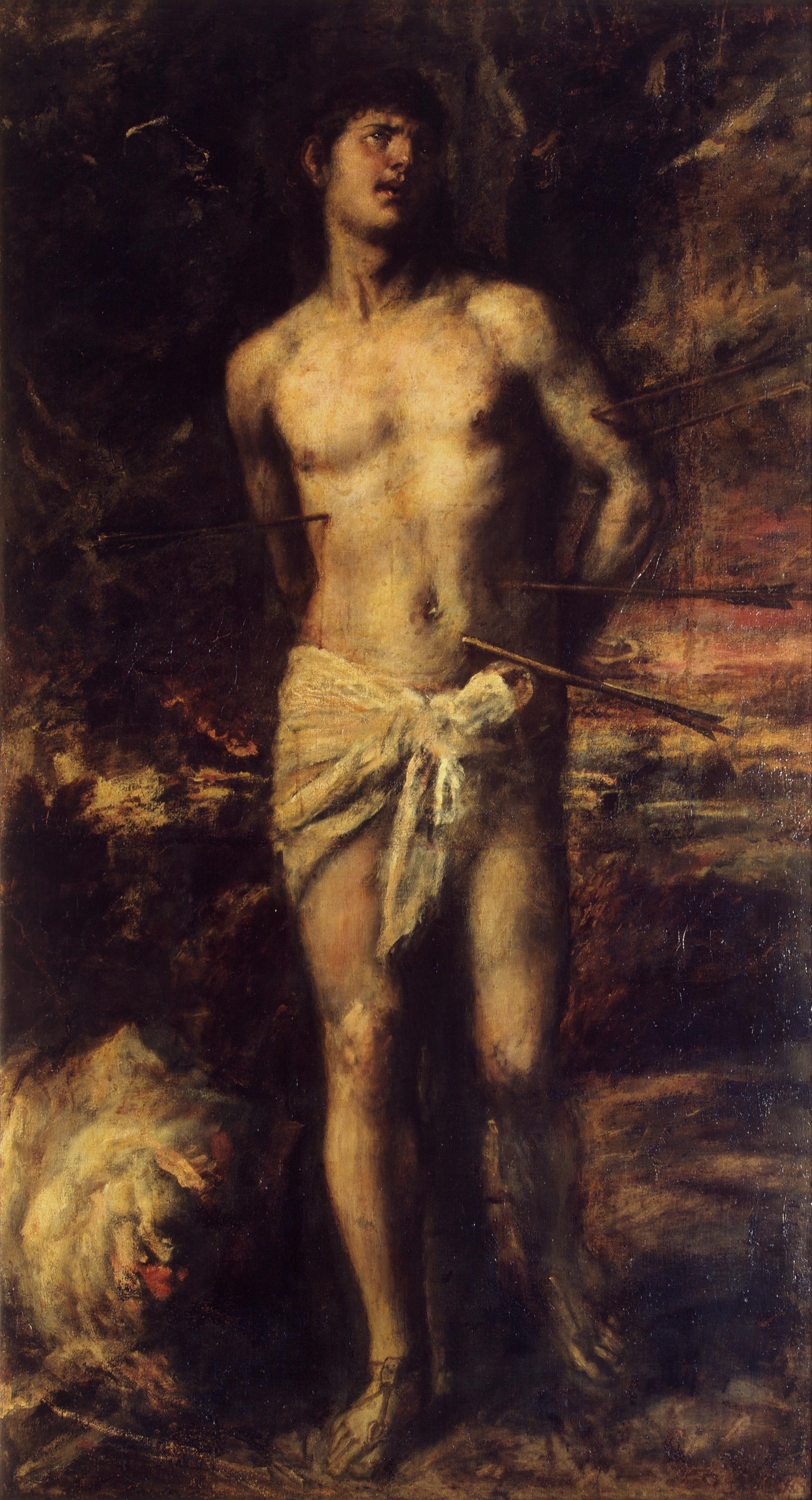
- Artist: Titian
- Year: 1570 – 1572
- Medium: oil on canvas
- Dimensions: 212 cm × 116 cm (83 in × 46 in)
- Location: Hermitage Museum; Saint Petersburg

Saint Sebastian is a 1570–1572 painting of Saint Sebastian by Titian, now in the Hermitage Museum in Saint Petersburg.

== History ==
Titian painted Saint Sebastian around 1576. It was acquired by the Hermitage Museum from the Barbarigo Gallery in Venice in 1850.

== See also ==
- List of works by Titian
- Averoldi Polyptych
