= In Ecclesiis =

In Ecclesiis is one of Giovanni Gabrieli's most famous single works. An example of polychoral techniques, it also epitomizes Baroque and Renaissance styles, with its use of hexachord-based harmonies, chromatic mediants, movement by fifths, pedal points and extended plagal cadences.

Written while Gabrieli was first the organist at St Mark's Basilica as well as the organist at the Scuola di San Rocco, Venice, the music may have been designed to be performed for one of these institutions. The individual groups of instrumentalists and singers would likely have been spatially separated, creating a polychoral, antiphonal texture.

Although the text can be considered sacred, it is not liturgical.

There are four groups and Continuo/Organ. Two of these groups are instrumental, the other two vocal.

- Group One (Soloists) whose parts are fluid and virtuosic.

Countertenor
Alto
Tenor
Baritone

- Group Two (Chorus) whose parts are mainly homophonic though a few bars have a more contrapuntal texture. This group is restricted to a seven-bar 'Alleluia' antiphon repeated between various solo and instrumental sections.

Alto 1
Alto 2
Tenor
Bass

- Group Three

First Cornett
Second Cornett
Third Cornett

- Group Four

Violino
Tenor Trombone
Bass Trombone

- Continuo-Organ and String Bass

The work would likely have been performed originally with an all-male choir. The instrumental groups in the score may differ from those in modern performances, in which the cornetti may be replaced by either Trumpet, Cornet, or Oboe, and the sackbuts (tromboni) by modern trombones.

The overall structure of this piece is similar to the liturgical performance of psalmody, in which the 'Alleluia' antiphon is sung between each section (although Gabrieli continually alternates among the singers singing the antiphon in this setting).

Gabrieli's use of suspensions, consonant fourths, passing notes, and other forms of dissonance creates points of tension and excitement. The work is usually scored in A minor but the lack of the G# outside of cadences gives the modal (Aeolian) tonality. Many phrases end with a cadential Tierce de Picardie.
