= Santo Stefano, Venice =

Roman Catholic church in Venice, Italy

Coordinates: 45°25′59.44″N 12°19′48.68″E

Church of San Stefano
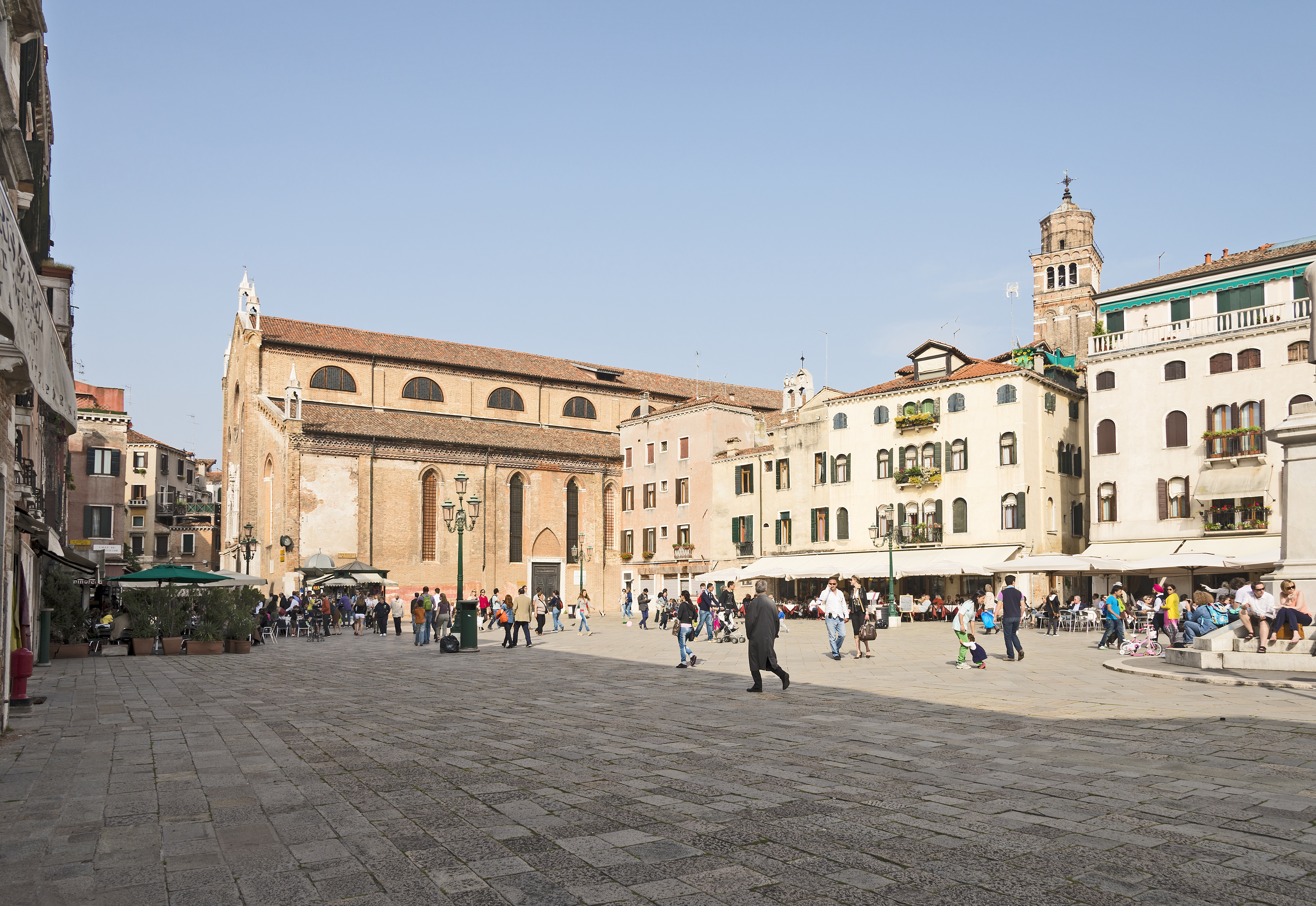
- Church in Campo Santo Stefano

- Location within Venice Location within Italy

Religion
- Affiliation: Roman Catholic
- Province: Venice

Location
- Location: Venice, Italy

Architecture
- Type: Church
- Style: Gothic
- Completed: 15th century

The Chiesa di Santo Stefano (Church of St. Stephen) is a large Roman Catholic church at the northern end of the Campo Santo Stefano in the sestiere of San Marco, Venice, Italy.

== History ==
It was founded in the 13th century, rebuilt in the 14th century and altered again early in the 15th century, when the fine gothic doorway and ship's keel roof were added. The tall interior is also Gothic in style and has three apses.

Santo Stefano is parish church of one of the parishes in the Vicariate of San Marco-Castello. The other churches of the parish are San Samuele, San Maurizio, San Vidal and the Oratorio di San Angelo degli Zoppi.

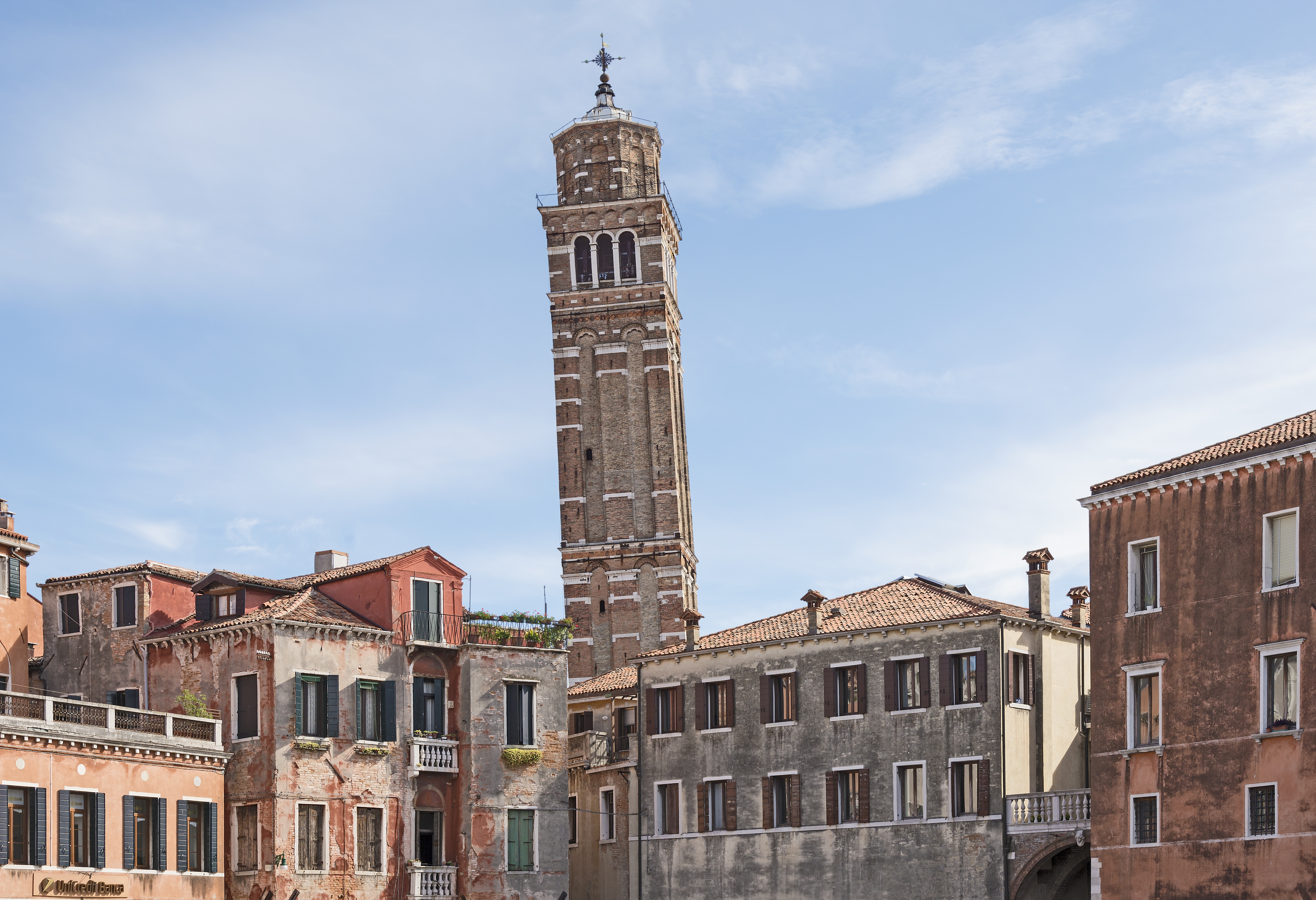
Campanile of Santo Stefano Venice, seen from the Campo Sant'Angelo.

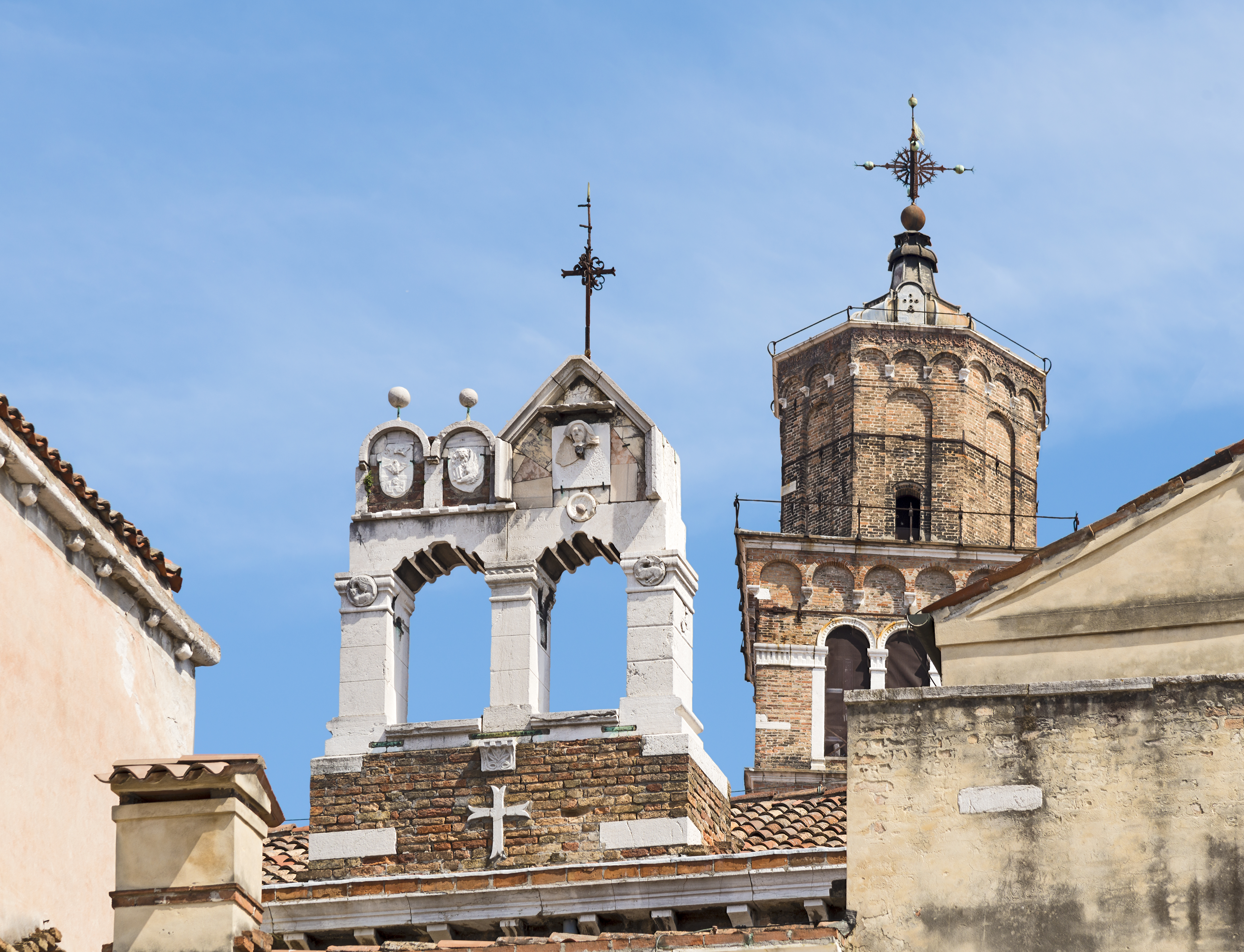
Leaning campanile, and empty bellcote

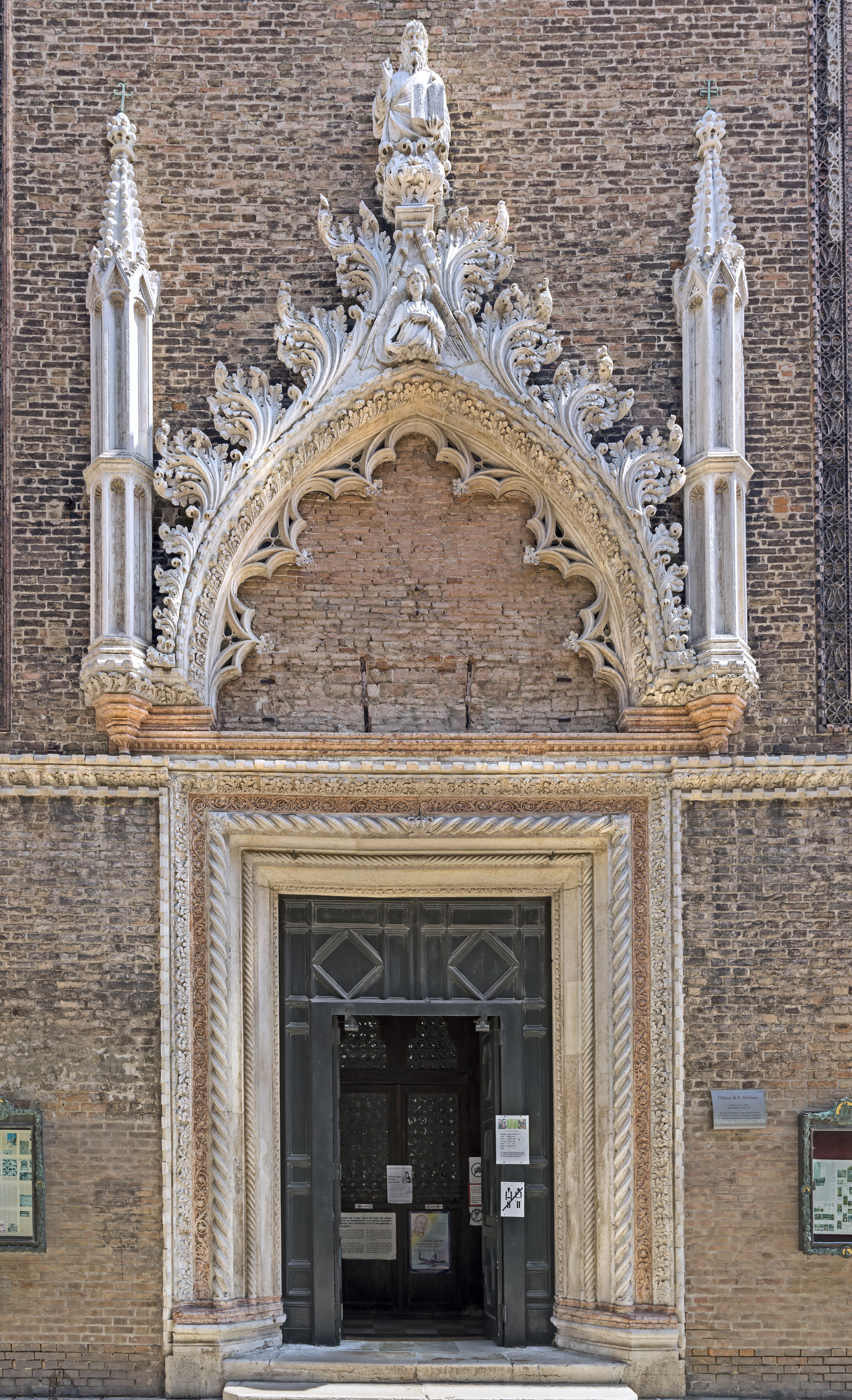
Gothic portal attributed to Bartolomeo Bon.

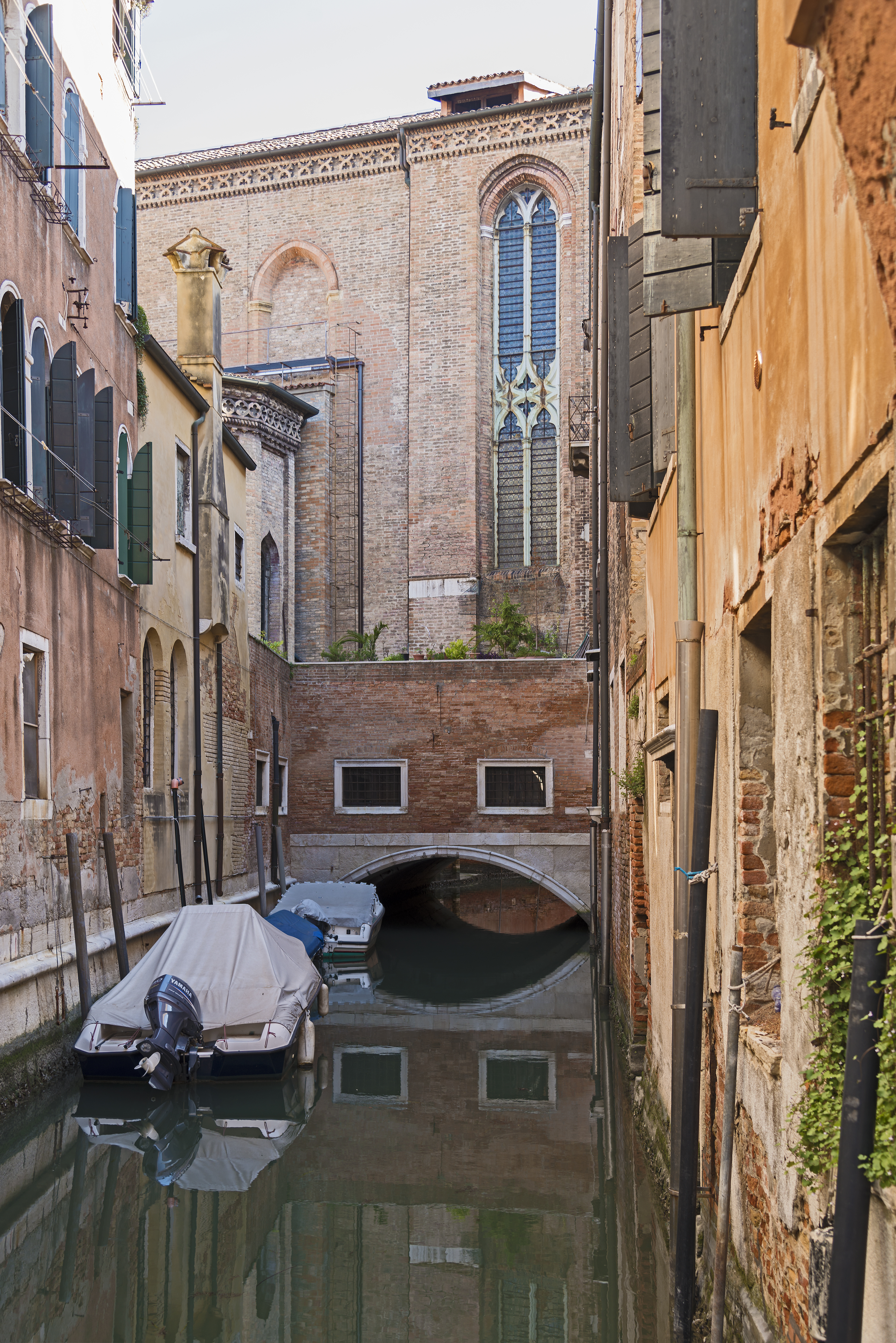
Ponte sotto San Stefano

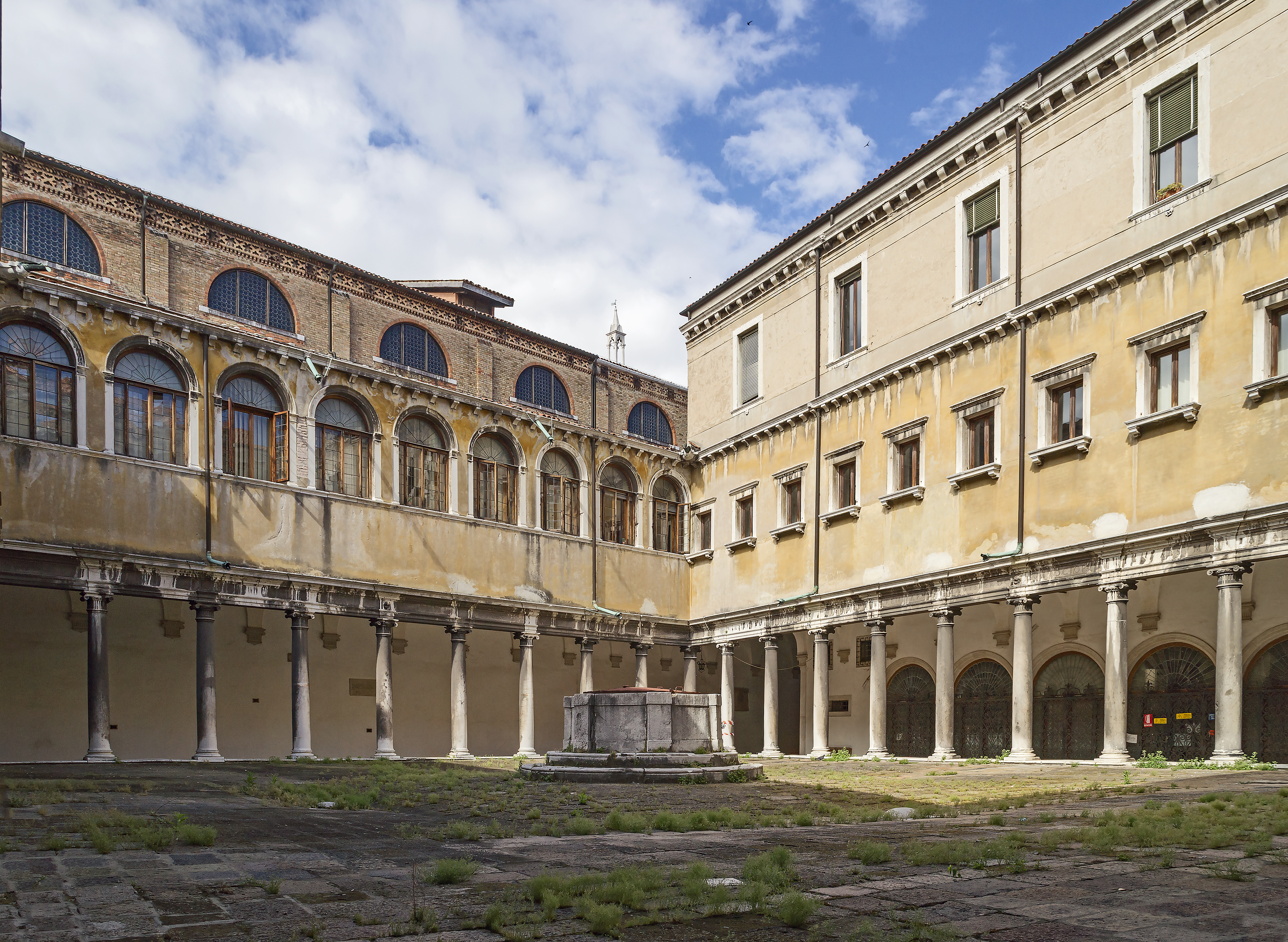
Former convent of Santo Stefano, in Venice, The main cloister, East exposure.

== Works of art ==
- Antonio Canova (stele commemorating Giovanni Falier in the baptistery)
- Pietro Lombardo (tomb of Giacomo Surian)
- Tullio Lombardo (two marble statuettes in the sacristy (attributed))
- Tintoretto (The Agony in the Garden, The Last Supper and The Washing of the Disciples' Feet, all in the sacristy)
- Paolo Veneziano (painted Crucifix in the sacristy)
- Bartolomeo Vivarini (St Lawrence and St Nicholas of Bari in the sacristy)

== Funerary monuments ==
- Doge Andrea Contarini (d.1382)
- Giovanni Falier
- Doge Francesco Morosini
- Giacomo Surian
- Giovanni Gabrieli (d. 1612)
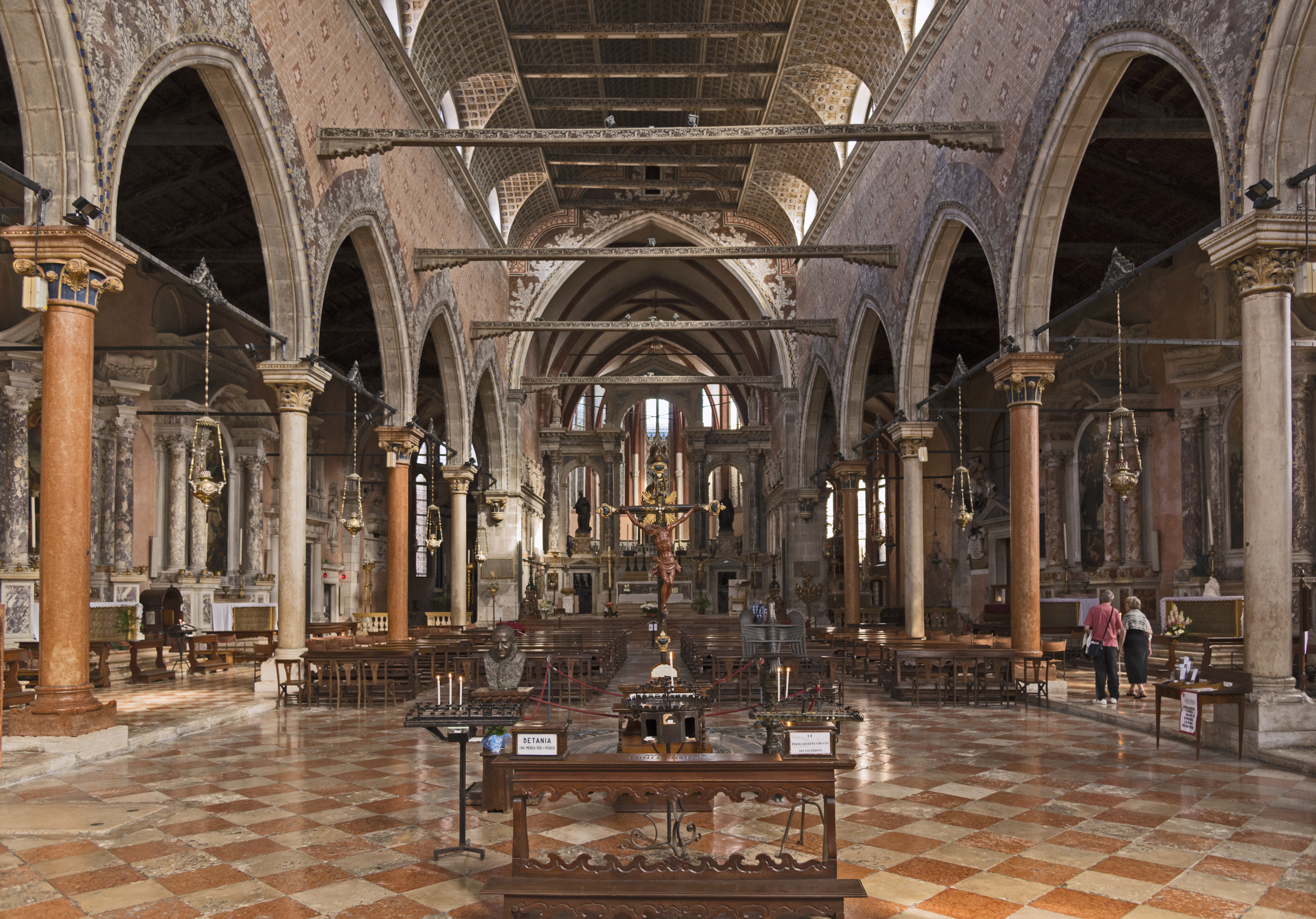
Interior

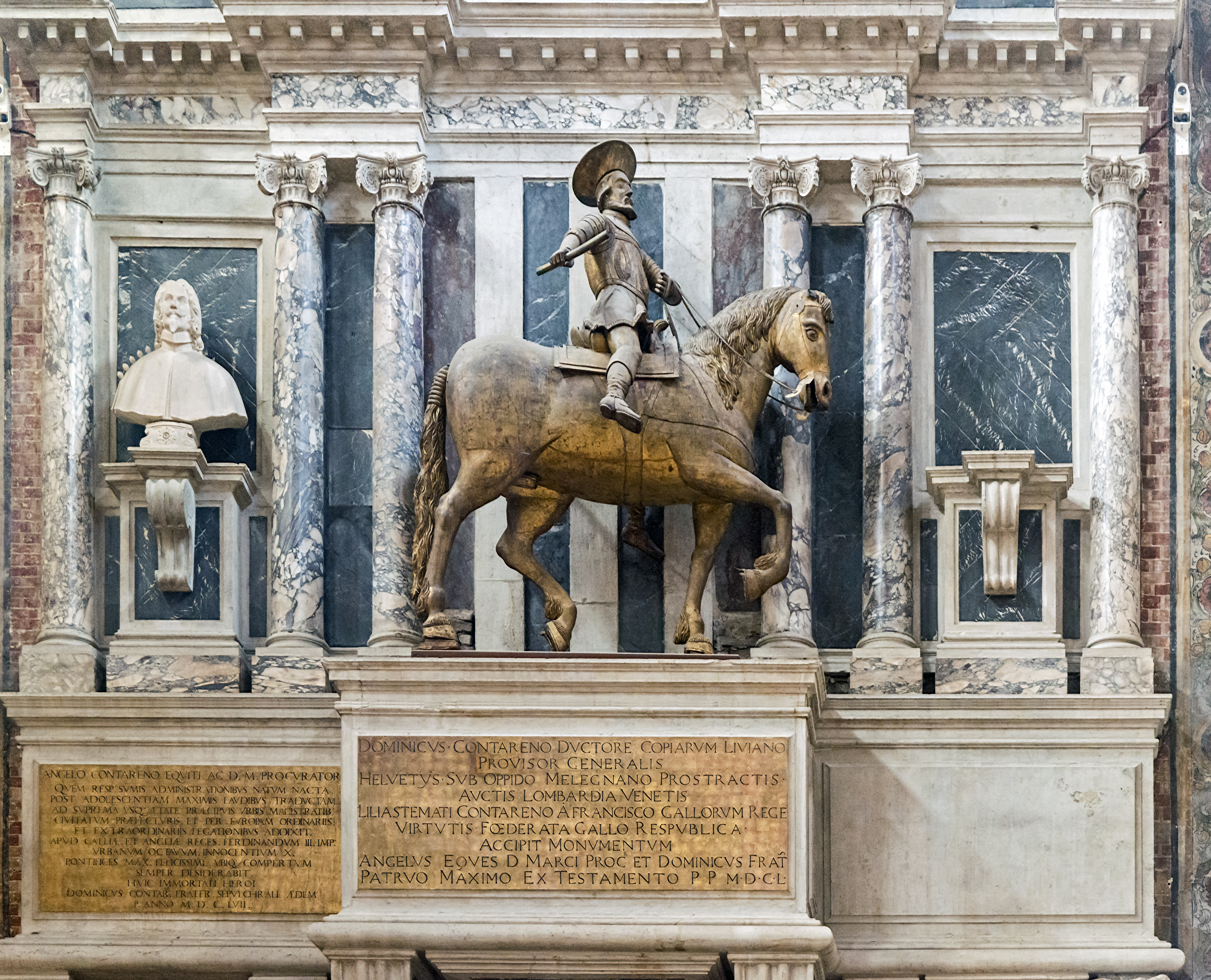
Domenico Contarini's mausoleum

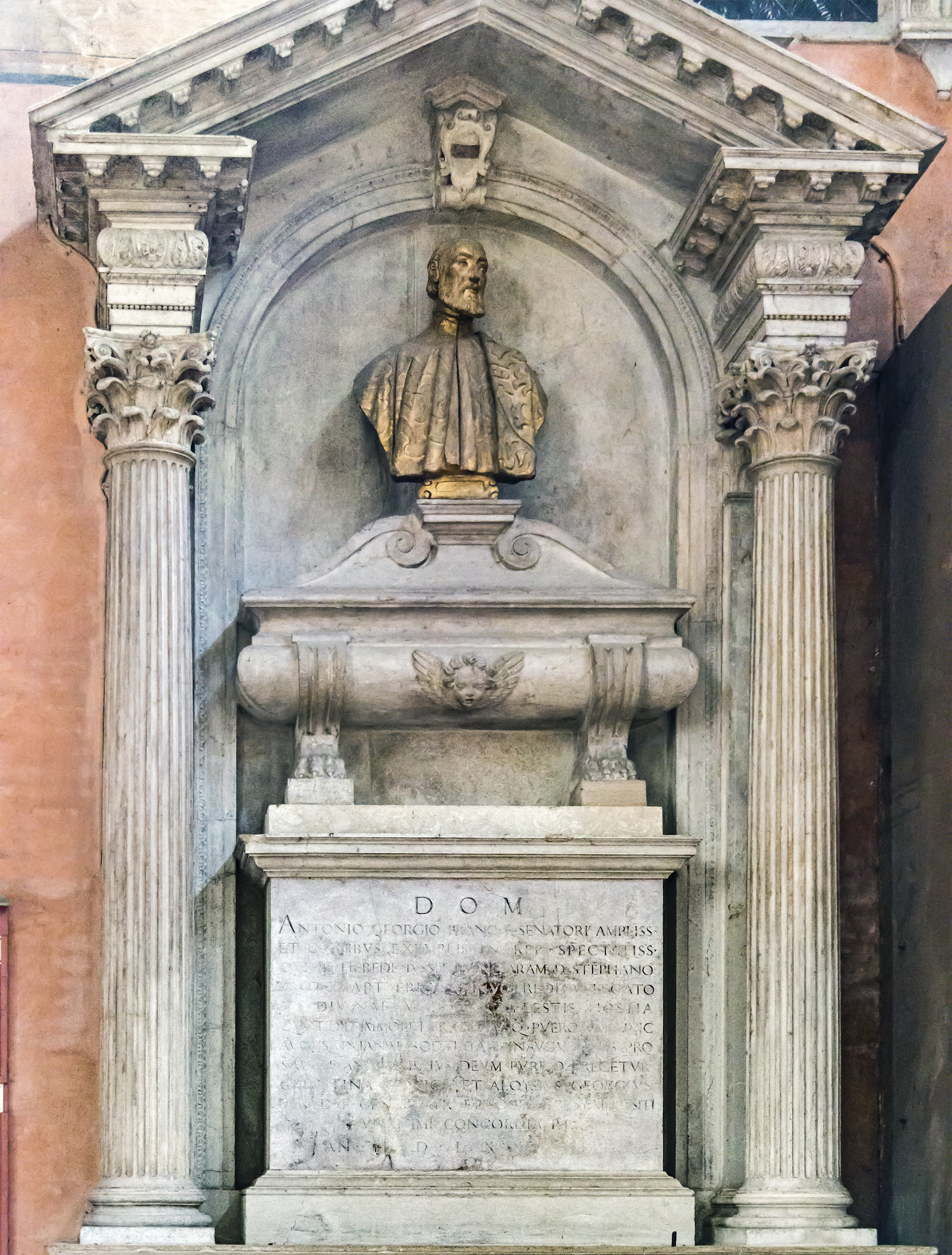
Antonio Zorzi - Tomb

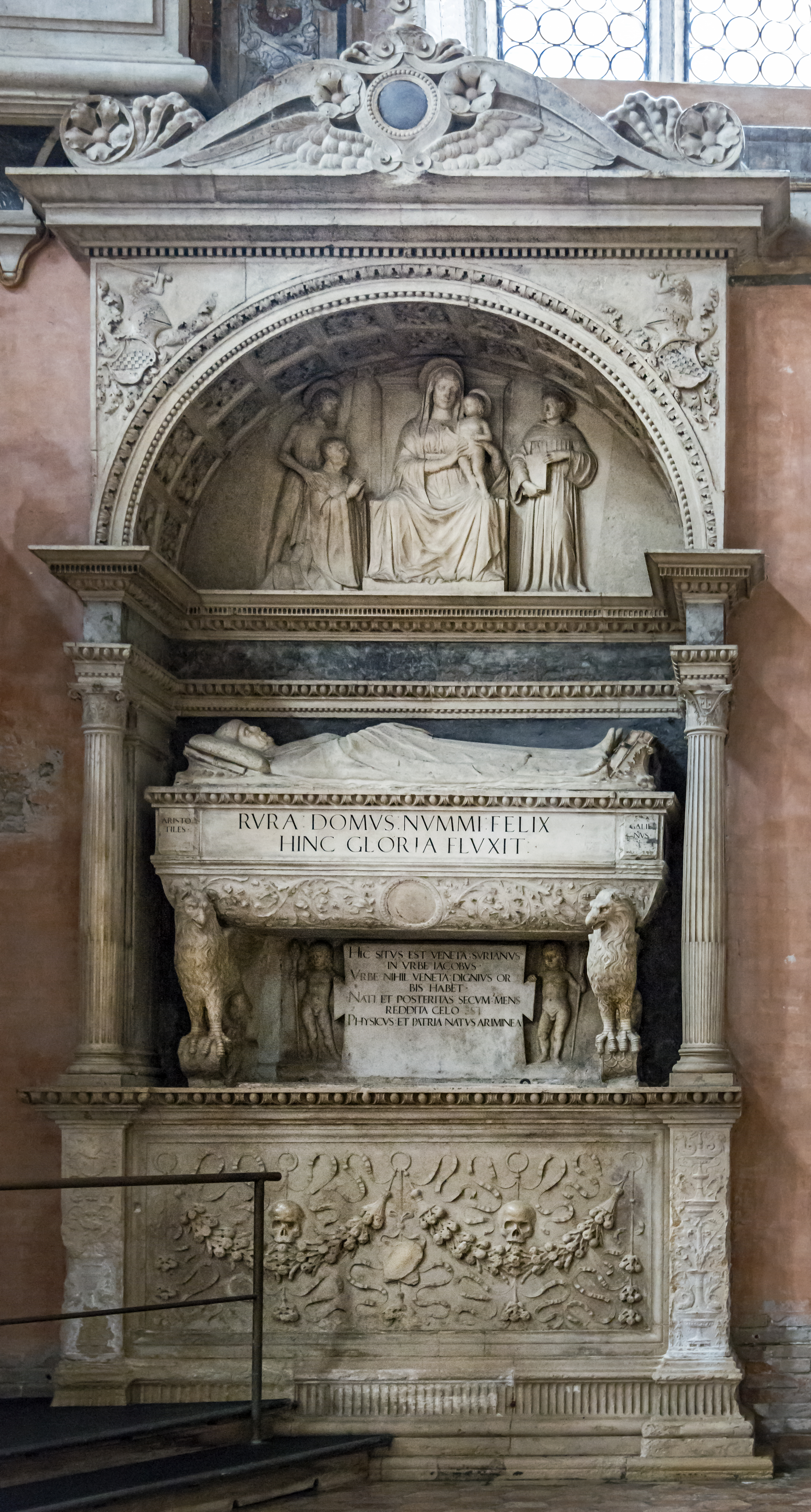
Giacomo Surian's grave

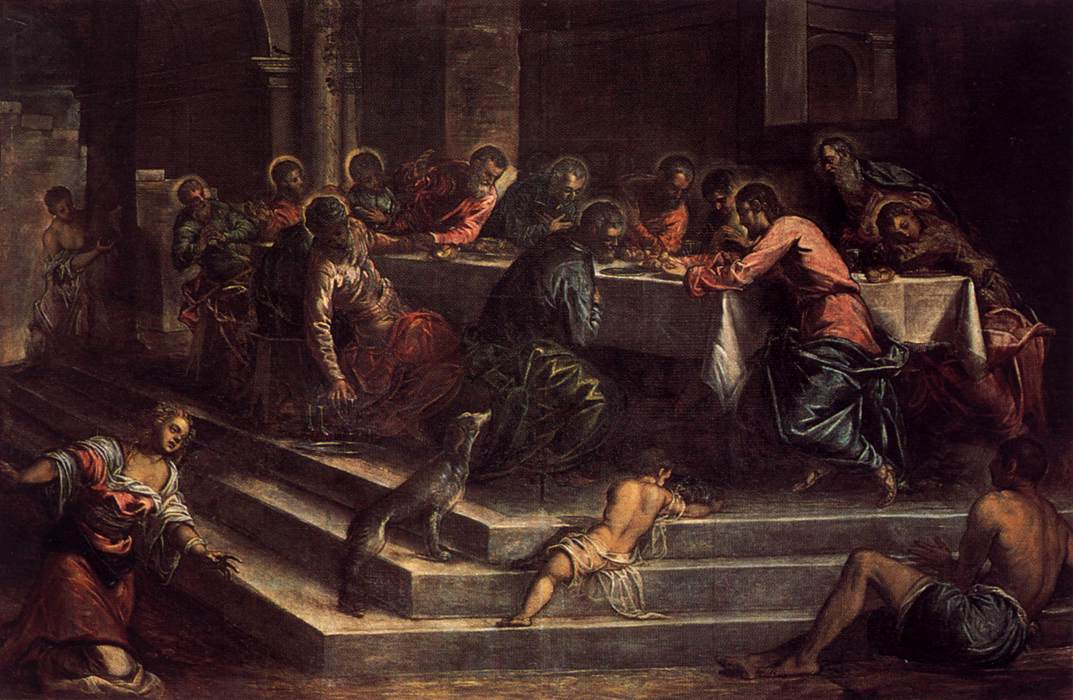
The Last Supper Jacopo Tintoretto
