= Scordatura =

Nonstandard tuning of a string instrument

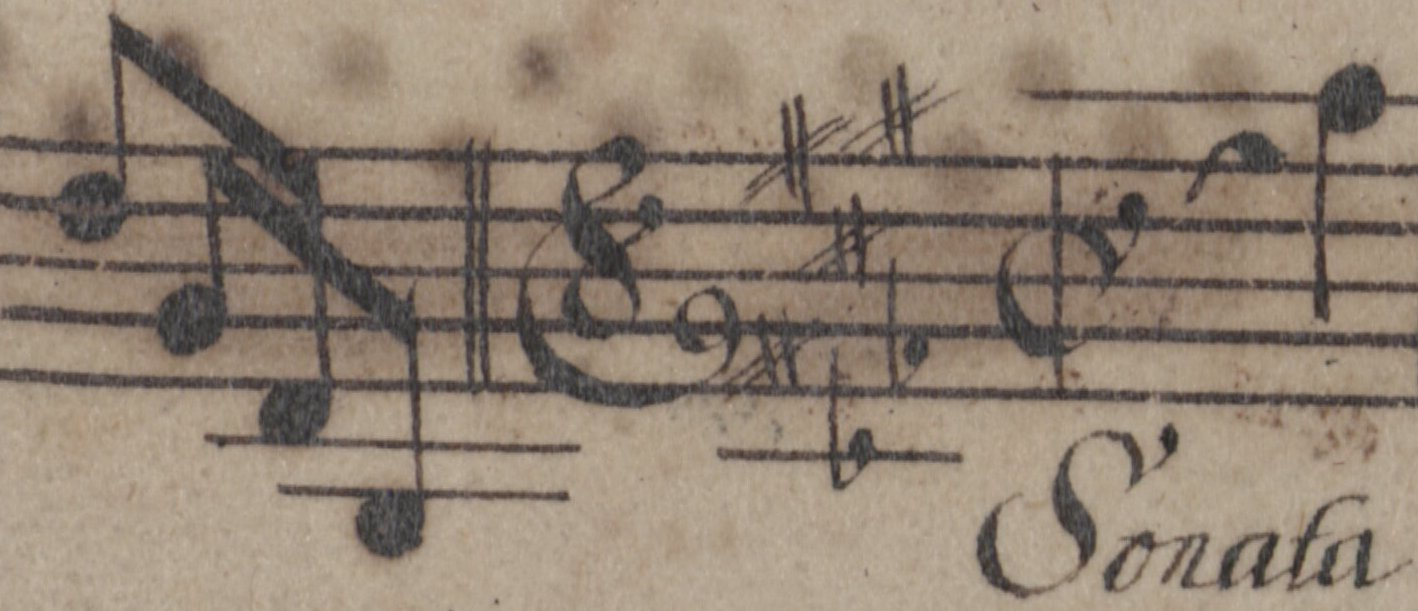
Information on the scordatura of Rosary Sonata XI by Heinrich Ignaz Franz Biber

Scordatura ([skordaˈtuːra]; literally, Italian for "discord", or "mistuning") is a tuning of a string instrument that is different from the normal, standard tuning. It typically attempts to allow special effects or unusual chords or timbre, or to make certain passages easier to play. It is common to notate the finger position as if played in regular tuning, while the actual pitch resulting is altered (scordatura notation). When all the strings are tuned by the same interval up or down, as in the case of the viola in Mozart's Sinfonia Concertante for Violin, Viola and Orchestra, the part is transposed as a whole. Cross-tuning is the same concept, but that term is used particularly in a folk music context.

== Bowed string instruments ==
The invention of scordatura tuning has been attributed to Thomas Baltzar, a prodigious German violinist and composer who is known to have used the technique in around the 1660s, at least a decade before Biber composed his Rosary Sonatas in which he employed the tuning technique. German violinist Hans Hake (1628 – after 1667) included three works in Vorstimmung ("upset tuning") for two violins (#25, #29, & #33) in his collection "Ander Theil Newer Pavanen,..." (Stade: Elias Holwein, 1654), however, suggesting that this attribution may be inaccurate.

Scordatura was much used by composers for viola d'amore, violin and cello, including J. S. Bach, Biber, Vivaldi, Ariosti, Vilsmayr, and others in compositions for violin during the early 18th century. A special type of notation was used to make it easier to read. This notation was also used to notate music for the viola d'amore, an instrument played and composed for by composers such as Biber and Vivaldi. The viola d'amore used a great number of different tunings and writing music for it in scordatura notation was a natural choice for composers of the time.

== Notable usage of scordatura in Western art music ==
=== Violin ===
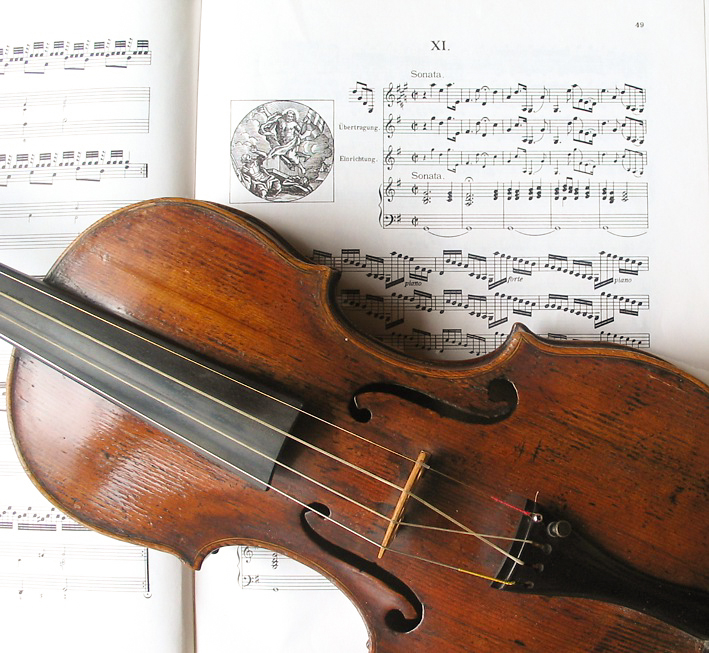
Violin with strings crossed for Biber's Resurrection sonata

- Heinrich Ignaz Franz Biber's Rosary Sonatas for violin and continuo (c. 1674). Aside from the first ("Annunciation") and last works ("Passacaglia", for solo violin) of this collection, wherein the instrument is set to the common G-D-A-E tuning, the violin for each sonata is tuned to a different array of pitches. Sonata XI ("Resurrection") is a special case: in addition to a unique scordatura, the two inner strings of the violin are interchanged between the bridge and tailpiece of the instrument, thus creating a tuning (from top string to bottom string) of G-g-D-d. "Harmonia Artificiosa no. VII" in C minor is written in a form of scordatura on a nine line stave. See viola d'amore for more information.
- Johann Joseph Vilsmayr "Artificiosus Consentus Pro Camera", a set of six partitas published in 1715. The middle four partitas use scordatura tunings.
- Johann Pachelbel's Musikalische Ergötzung bestehend in 6 verstimmten Partien (Musical Entertainment consisting of six suites for mistuned violins, 1691), six suites for two violins and continuo. Tunings include C-F-C-F, C-G-C-F, B♭-E♭-B♭-E♭, B-E-B-E, C-G-C-F, and B♭-F-B♭-E♭.
- Antonio Vivaldi, violin concerto in A major, Op.9, No.6, in which the violin's G string is tuned up to an A, allowing for a beautifully resonant scale and arpeggio motif ending on the retuned string.
- Georg Philipp Telemann, Concerto in A Major for two Violins, TWV 43:7.
- In Joseph Haydn's Symphony No. 60 in C (Il Distratto), the first and second violins start the finale of this unusual six-movement symphony with the lowest string tuned to F, but tune up to G in the course of the music to create a comical effect. The title of the symphony means "the absent-minded man" – so it is as if the violins have "forgotten" to tune their strings. The music fully pauses for the violins to re-tune before continuing. Haydn also uses a violin with the lowest string tuned to F in the trio of his Symphony No. 67 in F.
- Niccolò Paganini's Violin Concerto No. 1 initially required the strings of the solo violin to be tuned a semitone higher to match the original key of E♭ major.
- Camille Saint-Saëns, solo violin in Danse Macabre, where the E-string is tuned to E♭. This changes the open intervals of the double stop A and E to the tritone (A and E♭), which is used as the opening motif of the work.
- Gustav Mahler, scordatura violin soloist in the 2nd movement of his 4th Symphony. In this case, the composer probably desired the specific tone of the sound produced by a scordatura violin, which is less "suave" than the sound of a standard tuning.
- Franz von Vecsey's Nuit du Nord, a 1921 work for violin and piano, requires the G string to be tuned down to F♯.
- In Max Scherek's Sérénade et boléro for solo violin, Op. 27, the violin must be tuned to F, F, D, B♭.
- Igor Stravinsky's The Firebird makes a rare, perhaps unique, demand for the entire first violin section to retune the E string, in order to play the D major harmonic glissandi of the introduction.
- In Béla Bartók's piece Contrasts for clarinet, violin and piano, the opening bars of the third movement utilize a different tuning on a separate violin (G♯-D-A-E♭) for a Hungarian folk effect.
- Richard Strauss's tone poem Ein Heldenleben as well as his opera Elektra and Salome include passages in which the violins must tune their G strings down in order to play a G♭ or F♯.
- György Ligeti's Violin Concerto.
- John Corigliano's Stomp for solo violin (2010) requires the outer two strings to be tuned lower, resulting in a E-D-A-D♯ tuning.
- Eugène Ysaÿe's Poème élégiaque requires the lowest string to be tuned down to F.

=== Viola d'amore ===
- In the original version of Vivaldi’s opera Tito Manlio (Mantua, 1719), Servilia’s aria ‘Tu dormi in tante pene’ also contains an obbligato part for viola d'amore written in scordatura notation. This part would undoubtedly have been played by Vivaldi himself. He was the only known player of the instrument at the court of the Duke of Hesse-Darmstadt in Mantua, his employer at that time and for whom this opera was written. The obbligato part is on smaller paper inserted into the first violin part. Vivaldi would have led the orchestra from the concertmaster's chair and would have played the first violin part, presumably switching to viola d'amore for this aria. The aria "Quanto Magis Generosa" in Vivaldi's Oratorio "Juditha triumphans" (1716) also contains an obbligato part for viola d'amore written in scordatura notation. This piece was written for the Ospedale della Pieta and the obbligato part would have been played either by Vivaldi or by Anna Maria del violino, one of the senior musicians there at the time who was a known player of the viola d'amore. All Vivaldi's other works for viola d'amore, (eight concertos and two obbligato numbers in different settings of the "Nisi Dominus"), are written in normal notation at sounding pitch.

=== Viola ===
- Mozart wrote the solo viola part for his Sinfonia Concertante a semitone lower, with the viola strings to be tuned a semitone higher to D♭, A♭, E♭, B♭. Thus part is written in D major (the key of the work is E♭ major). A common practice of the time, changing the pitch of the open strings was primarily intended to make the viola sound louder, and so better discernible in the symphonic orchestra: indeed, increasing the tension in a string, not only sharpens the pitch, but also makes it sound louder, the loudest sound being obtained just before breaking. Other viola concerti employing this type of scordatura were written by Carl Stamitz, Johann Baptist Wanhal, Johann Andreas Amon, Jiří Družecký, Johannes Matthias Sperger and Johann Georg Hermann Voigt. The fragment of Mozart's Sinfonia Concertante for violin, viola, and cello similarly is written in A major, but the viola part is written in G major with the strings to be tuned a whole tone higher.
- In Carl Nielsen's Hymnus amoris, Op.12, the violas are asked to retune the C string to the lower A from bar 494 to the end (bar 606).
- In Richard Strauss's Don Quixote, the solo viola tunes the C string down to B.1
- The first movement of Charles Koechlin's Viola Sonata, Op. 53, requires the C string to be tuned down a whole step to B♭.
- Géza Frid's 1946 Sonatina for viola and piano, Op. 25, requires the violist to tune the lower two strings up a semitone for movement IV, resulting in C♯, G♯, D, A.

=== Cello ===
- Johann Sebastian Bach's Fifth Cello Suite is written with the A string, the highest string, tuned down a whole step to a G. This tuning allows chords which would be difficult or impossible at regular tuning. The Suite is also played with standard tuning, but some pitches must be altered, and occasional notes removed to accommodate the tuning.
- Robert Schumann's Piano Quartet in E-flat, Op. 47, requires the cellist to retune the C string down to B♭ for the last 42 bars of the third movement.
- Igor Stravinsky's The Rite of Spring, the final chord of The Rite of Spring requires the cellos to retune A to G♯ so it may be played "open" (unstopped by the fingers and consequently more resonant) as part of a quadruple stop.
- Ottorino Respighi's tone poem Pines of Rome requires the cellos to tune the low C string down to a B in the third movement. Also, the basses must either have a fifth low B string or tune a C extension down to the B in the third and fourth movements.
- Zoltán Kodály's Solo Cello Sonata in B minor requires the cellist to tune down the two lower strings from G and C to F♯ and B, to emphasize the key with recurring B-minor chords.
- Luciano Berio's Sequenza XIV requires the G string to be tuned up to a G♯, to better depict the kandyan drumming passages, as well as creating extreme dissonances over all four strings.
- The cello in George Crumb's chamber work Vox Balaenae (scored for electric flute, electric cello, and electric piano). The traditional C-G-D-A tuning is changed to B-F♯-D♯-A, which serves to emphasize the key of B major that emerges in the final movement.
- In Alban Berg's Lyric Suite, the cello tunes the C string down to B for the final movement.
- The cello in Paul Hindemith’s 2nd string quartet tunes their C string down to B♭ during part of the 3rd movement.
- The cello soloist's final note of Andrew Lloyd Webber's Variations requires the player to play and retune in one movement, creating a dramatic glissando effect to the A below the cello's normal lowest note of C.

=== Double bass ===
The double bass is sometimes required to play notes lower than the E to which its lowest string is normally tuned. This can be accomplished with a special mechanical extension with which some double basses are equipped or the composer may ask the double bass to tune down its E string, as in, for example, the third movement of Brahms's Requiem, in which Brahms has some of the double basses tune the E-string down to D in order to sustain the low D pedal point or in the 9th Movement of Ma mère l'oye (Cinquième tableau – Laideronnette, impératrice des Pagodes), in which Ravel has the double basses lower their E-strings a semitone. (George Crumb's A Haunted Landscape requires that two bassists use C extensions and still tune down past them to B♭.) Other kinds of scordatura occur most commonly in solo double bass literature, especially including one that raises all four strings a whole step to F♯'-B'-E-A.

== Guitar ==
Alternate tunings other than symmetrically stepped-down versions of standard or drop-D tuning (where the lowest string is tuned down two half-steps for simple barred power or fifth chords) are rare in modern classical guitar music, but before the nineteenth century they occurred more often. Drop-D tuning remains common. The sixteenth-century guitar typically had four courses (rather than six strings, as the modern classical does), and the seventeenth-century and eighteenth-century guitar typically had five courses. These were subject to a variety of tunings, such that there is some difficulty establishing which, if any, to consider the standard tuning from which the others deviate. It is sometimes suggested that classical guitarists wishing to read Renaissance lute or vihuela tablature tune their guitar E-A-d-f♯-b-e' since these instruments in this period usually have the major third between the 3rd and 4th strings.

With the exception of bands using seven-, eight- or recently nine-string guitars to extend the instrument's range downwards, rhythm guitar for modern metal almost universally uses stepped-down versions of standard or drop D tuning, with professionals and amateurs alike commonly using terminology like “tuning to C” (same pattern as standard tuning, but all strings lowered by four half-steps) or “Drop C tuning” (drop-D tuning lowered two half-steps). Conversely, other tuning patterns are rare, with the few popular acts using them commonly widely recognized for the fact (prominent examples being the bands Sonic Youth and Soundgarden).

In certain kinds of folk music alternate tunings for guitar can be fairly frequently found, most typically open tunings where the open strings are tuned to a full major, minor, suspended or extended chord.

== Piano ==
Some 20th and 21st century music calls for certain notes on the piano to be tuned differently, or the entire piano to be tuned altogether.

- John Corigliano's Three Hallucinations from the film Altered States requires a piano tuner to tune 9 pitches to be a quarter tone flat, and 10 pitches to be "out of tune".
- Ivan Wyschnegradsky wrote several pieces for quarter-tone piano, many of which are recorded on two separate pianos tuned a quarter tone apart.

== See also ==
- Cross tuning
- Slack tuning
- Stringed instrument tunings
