= Cross tuning =

Cross tuning or cross-tuning (also called scordatura in classical music) is an alternative tuning used for the open strings of a string instrument. The term refers to the practice of retuning the strings; it also refers to the various tunings commonly used, or in some contexts it may refer specifically to the AEAE fiddle tuning. In folk music traditions, cross-tunings are used to give the instrument a different sound by altering the pitch of string resonances and drones. It may be notated in the normal way, with notes written at the sounding pitch, or the written notes may represent the finger position as if played in regular tuning, while the sounded pitch is altered.

== In American folk fiddle music ==
Cross tuning is commonly used on the fiddle in folk music of Appalachia, the southern United States and Scandinavia. The fiddle may be re-tuned in any number of ways in these musical idioms, but there are two common re-tunings. While the standard tuning for open strings of the violin is GDAE—with the G being the tuning of the lowest-pitched string and the E being the tuning for the highest-pitched string—fiddlers playing tunes in the key of D major sometimes employ a tuning of ADAE. In this tuning the open G string is raised to the A directly above it. Even more frequently used is a cross tuning of AEAE for music played in the key of A major. Among fiddlers this is referred to as "cross-tuning." Both of these tunings facilitate a drone on an open string next to the string on which the melody is being played. Relatively well-known American folk tunes that are often played in cross-tuning include "Breaking Up Christmas," "Cluck Old Hen," "Hangman's Reel," "Horse and Buggy," and "Ways of the World."

GDAE is known in some old-time fiddling circles as "that Italian tuning," the implication being that it is only one of many possibilities (on the other hand, in the biography of Arizona fiddler K.C. Kartchner his daughter specifically uses "the Italian tuning" to mean a cross-tuning which is not GDAE). Some other common tunings include:

- FCGD = Cajun Tuning (one whole step down from GDAE)
- GDGD = Sawmill Tuning or "Cross G"
- GDAD = "Gee-Dad"
- DDAD = Dead Man's Tuning, or Open D Tuning, or Bonaparte's Retreat Tuning, or "Dee-Dad"
- ADAE = High Bass Tuning, Old-Timey D Tuning
- AEAE = Cross Tuning, "Cross A", "High Bass, High Counter" (or "High Bass, High Tenor"), Cross Chord; similar to Sawmill Tuning
- AEAC♯ = Black Mountain Rag Tuning, Calico Tuning, Open A Tuning, or Drunken Hiccups Tuning
- GDGB = "G-Calico tuning" (one whole step down from AEAC♯)
- AEAD for Old Sledge, Silver Lake
- EDAE for Glory in the Meeting House
- EEAE for Get up in the Cool
- GCGE for Over the Flatlands
