= Willem Pijper =

Dutch composer, music critic and teacher (1894–1947)

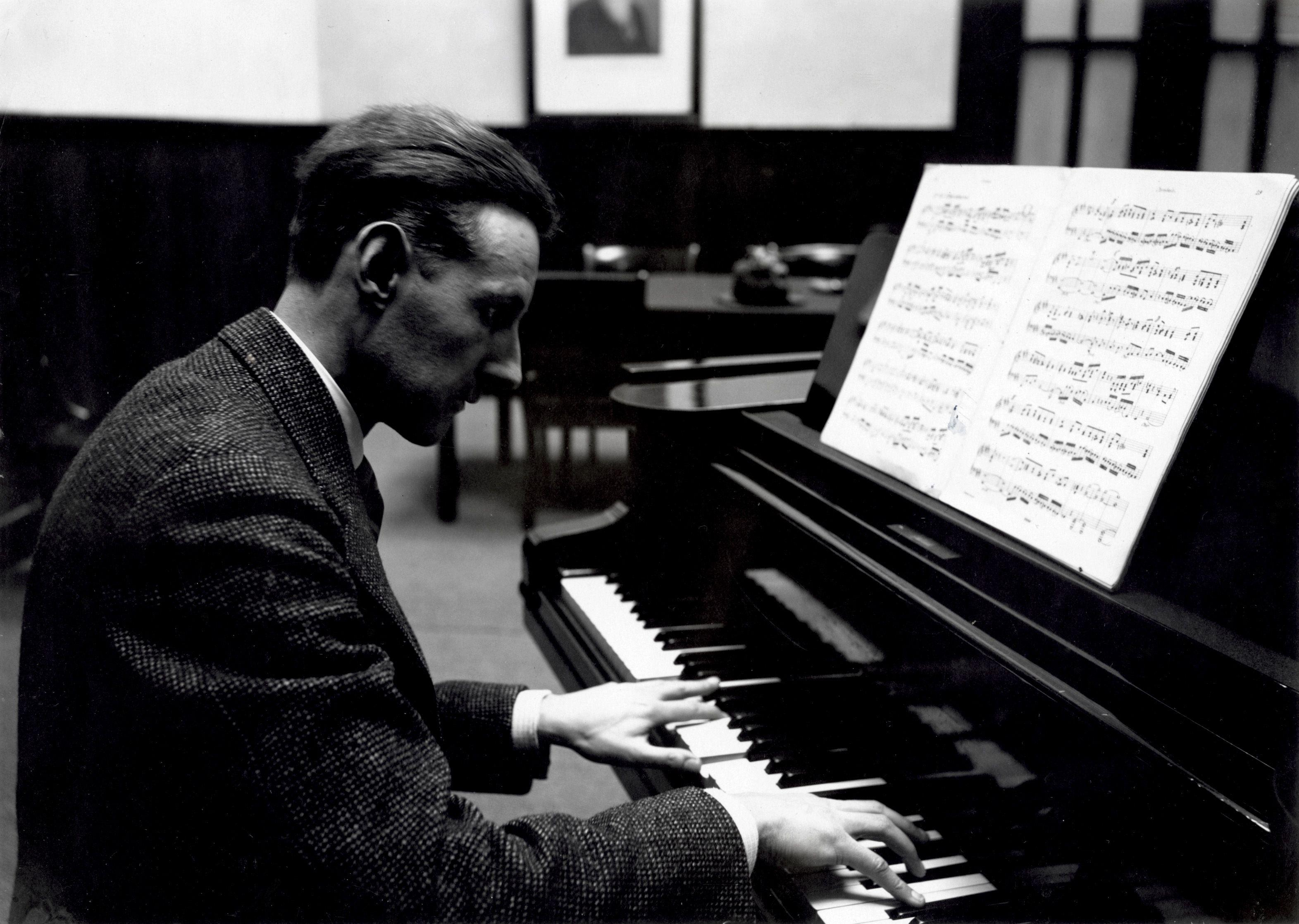
- Pijper c. 1935
- Born: Willem Frederik Johannes Pijper; 8 September 1894; Zeist, Netherlands
- Died: 18 March 1947 (aged 52); Utrecht, Netherlands
- Education: Utrecht Academy of Music
- Occupations: Composer; music critic; music teacher
- Known for: Having the Dutch term for "octatonic scale" named after him (Pijper toonladder)

Willem Frederik Johannes Pijper (Dutch pronunciation: [ˈʋɪləm ˈpɛipər]; 8 September 1894 – 18 March 1947) was a Dutch composer, music critic and music teacher. Pijper is considered to be among the most important Dutch composers of the first half of the 20th century.

== Life ==
Pijper was born at Zeist, near Utrecht, on 8 September 1894 of strict Calvinist working-class parents. His father, who sometimes played psalm accompaniments on the harmonium, taught him the names of the notes of the treble clef when he was five. Willem subsequently discovered the use of sharps and flats and began composing simple melodies. His fascination with symmetrical musical structures was evident even at this early age. At ten he began formal piano lessons and made rapid progress.

Poor health as a child meant that he was educated at home until age 13, but in 1912, after three years study at the gymnasium (high school), Pijper entered the Utrecht Academy of Music, where he was taught composition by Johan Wagenaar, passing examinations in theoretical subjects in 1915. Apart from his brief study with Wagenaar he was entirely self-taught as a composer.

Pijper occasionally gave piano recitals, but his activity as a critic was of greater importance. At the end of the First World War, he became a critic for the Utrechtsch Dagblad, and in that capacity was at least partly responsible for the departure of Jan van Gilse, then chief conductor of the Utrechts Stedelijk Orkest. Pijper’s constant vitriolic (and often ad hominem) attacks upon Van Gilse forced the latter to demand that the orchestra board refuse Pijper admittance to concerts; after the board had stalled on the issue for some time, Van Gilse resigned in 1921. Pijper has since been criticised for his role in the affair, also because his combined functions of critic and advisor for the Tivoli concert hall at least suggested a conflict of interest (Article about the Van Gilse/Pijper conflict in De Volkskrant (in Dutch)).

In 1926, with Paul F. Sanders, he established the periodical De Muziek, to which he contributed many essays. Collections of his essays were published by Querido under the title De Quintencirckel and De Stemvork.

Pijper spent much of his time during the war years working on a new opera, Merlijn, based on the Arthurian legend. Although he worked on the project for over six years, the work was never completed. In late 1946, he was diagnosed with cancer. During the closing weeks of his life he rewrote the orchestration to his Concerto for Violoncello and Orchestra. Pijper died in Utrecht on 18 March 1947.

== Music ==
Pijper quickly chose his own path as a composer. The difference in style between his First Symphony (Pan; 1917) (in which Mahler's influence is evident) and the Second (1921) is significant, and between 1918 and 1922 he grew into one of the more advanced composers in Europe. In each successive work he went a step further, starting from his conception that every work of art arises out of a number of "germ cells" (somewhat akin to Igor Stravinsky's early "cell technique").

From 1919, Pijper's music can be described as polytonal. Yet there is no question of Pijper's consciously abandoning tonality; rather his polyphonic way of thinking and his sense of counterpoint made his harmonic style evolve in that direction. In that sense, he stands quite close to the music of his contemporary Matthijs Vermeulen, but his music does not quite reach the ecstatic level of Vermeulen's. Nonetheless, Pijper remained a composer of strong emotional character, to which his Third Symphony (1926) bears witness. In Pijper's later works the harmonic expression seems at times to approach monotonality.

The octatonic scale has been called the "Pijper scale" in Dutch. As a teacher, Pijper had a great influence on modern Dutch music, teaching many prominent Dutch composers of the 1950s, 1960s, and 1970s. He was senior teacher of instrumentation at the Amsterdam Conservatoire, and from 1930 until his death in 1947 he acted as principal of the Rotterdam Conservatoire.

== List of works ==
- Orchestral music
  - Symphony No. 1 Pan (1917)
  - Symphony No. 2 (1921)
  - Symphony No. 3 (1926)
  - Six Adagios (1940)
  - Six Symphonic Epigrams (1928)
  - Concerto for Piano & Orchestra (1927)
  - Orchestral Piece with Piano (1915)
  - Concerto for Violin & Orchestra (1938–39)
  - Concerto for Violoncello Solo & Orchestra (1936/47)
- Chamber music
  - Septet for flute/piccolo, oboe/English horn, clarinet, bassoon, horn, double bass & piano (1920)
  - Sextet for flute, oboe, clarinet, bassoon, horn & piano (1923)
  - Phantasie for flute, oboe, clarinet, bassoon, horn & piano (1927) on Mozart's Phantasie für eine Spieluhr, 1791
  - Quintet for woodwinds: flute, oboe, clarinet, bassoon & horn (1929)
  - String Quartet No. 1 (1914) (Note: The part of the first violin in this quartet has to be played by a mute violin.)
  - String Quartet No. 2 (1920)
  - String Quartet No. 3 (1923)
  - String Quartet No. 4 (1928)
  - String Quartet No. 5 (1946)
  - Quattro Pezzi Antichi for 3 violins & violoncello (1923)
  - Trio for flute, clarinet & bassoon (1926–27)
  - Trio No. 1 for violin, violoncello & piano (1914)
  - Trio No. 2 for violin, violoncello & piano (1921)
  - Sonata for flute & piano (1925)
  - Sonata No. 1 for violin & piano (1919)
  - Sonata No. 2 for violin & piano (1922)
  - Sonata No. 1 for violoncello & piano (1919)
  - Sonata No. 2 for violoncello & piano (1924)
  - Sonata for violin solo (1931)
  - Passepied for carillon (1916)
- Piano music
  - De Boufon, Het Patertje Langs den Kant, Scharmoes for piano solo (1926) in the series "Folk Dances of the World"
  - Sonata for piano (1930)
  - Sonata for two pianos (1935)
  - Sonatina No. 1 for piano (1917)
  - Sonatina No. 2 for piano (1925)
  - Sonatina No. 3 for piano (1925)
  - Theme and Five Variations for piano solo (1913)
  - Three Aphorisms for piano solo (1915)
- Choral
  - La fille morte dans ses amours (1921) from "Deux Ballades de Paul Fort"
  - Le marchand de sable geork nos. 1 & 2 (1934) from "Deux Ballades de Paul Fort"
  - Chanson "Réveilles-vous piccars" (1932–33)
  - De Lente Komt (1917) (René de Clercq)
  - Op den Weefstoel (1918) (René de Clercq)
  - Heer Danielken (1925)
  - Heer Halewijn (1920)
  - Vanden Coning van Castilien (1936)
- Vocal (with instrumental accompaniment)
  - Fête Galantes (1916) (Paul Verlaine)
  - Hymne (1941–43) (Pieter Cornelis Boutens)
  - Songs from "The Tempest" (1930) (William Shakespeare)
  - Die Nächliche Heerschau (1922/43) (Carl Löwe)
  - Romance sans paroles, C'est le chien de Jean de Nivelle (1921) (Paul Verlaine)
- Voice and piano
  - Allerseelen (1914) (H. von Gilm)
  - Douwdeuntje (1916) (René de Clercq)
  - Fêtes Galantes (1916) (Paul Verlaine)
  - Two Songs on Ancient Dutch Texts (1923)
  - Four Songs (1916) (Bertha de Bruyn)
  - La Maumariée (1919–20)
  - Huit Noëls de France (1919)
  - Acht oud-Hollandsche liederen, first series (1924)
  - Acht oud-Hollandsche liederen, second series (1935)
  - Oud-Hollandsche minneliederen (1920/1942)
  - Vieilles chansons de France (1918/1946)
  - Twee Wachterliederen (1934)
  - Zestiende-eeuwsch Marialied (1929)
- Incidental music
  - Antigone (1920/1926) (Sophocles/Balthazar Verhagen)
  - De Bacchanten (1924) (Euripides/Verhagen)
  - De Cycloop (1925) (Euripides/Verhagen)
  - Faëton of Reuckelose Stoutheit (1937) (Joost van den Vondel)
  - The Tempest (1929–30) (William Shakespeare)
- Opera
  - Halewijn (1932–34), Symphonic drama in 9 scenes
  - Merlijn (1939–42) (Unfinished), Symphonic drama in 3 acts (Simon Vestdijk, libretto)

Adapted with permission from John Craton's Willem Pijper web page

Selected recordings[edit]

- The complete String Quartets. The Schönberg Quartet, Olympia Explorer, 1994
