= Johann Joseph Vilsmayr =

Austrian composer

Johann Joseph Vilsmayr (1663 – 11 July 1722) was a violinist and composer. From 1 September 1689 he worked at Salzburg's Hofkapelle, where he almost certainly became a pupil of Heinrich Ignaz Biber, one of the best contemporary European violinists. Judging from the regular increases of his salary, Vilsmayr must have quickly attained a good reputation at the court. He kept the Salzburg position until his death on 11 July 1722.

Vilsmayr's only surviving music is a collection published in Salzburg in 1715, titled Artificiosus Concentus pro Camera. It contains six partitas à Violino Solo Con Basso bellè imitate—a description that, until recently, was taken as "for solo violin and basso continuo". The bass part was presumed to be lost. However, scholar Pauline H. Nobes has recently demonstrated that the partitas were probably meant for violin solo, and Con Basso bellè imitate may refer to the polyphonic texture of the works.
