= Mute violin =

Violin without or with a very shallow sound box

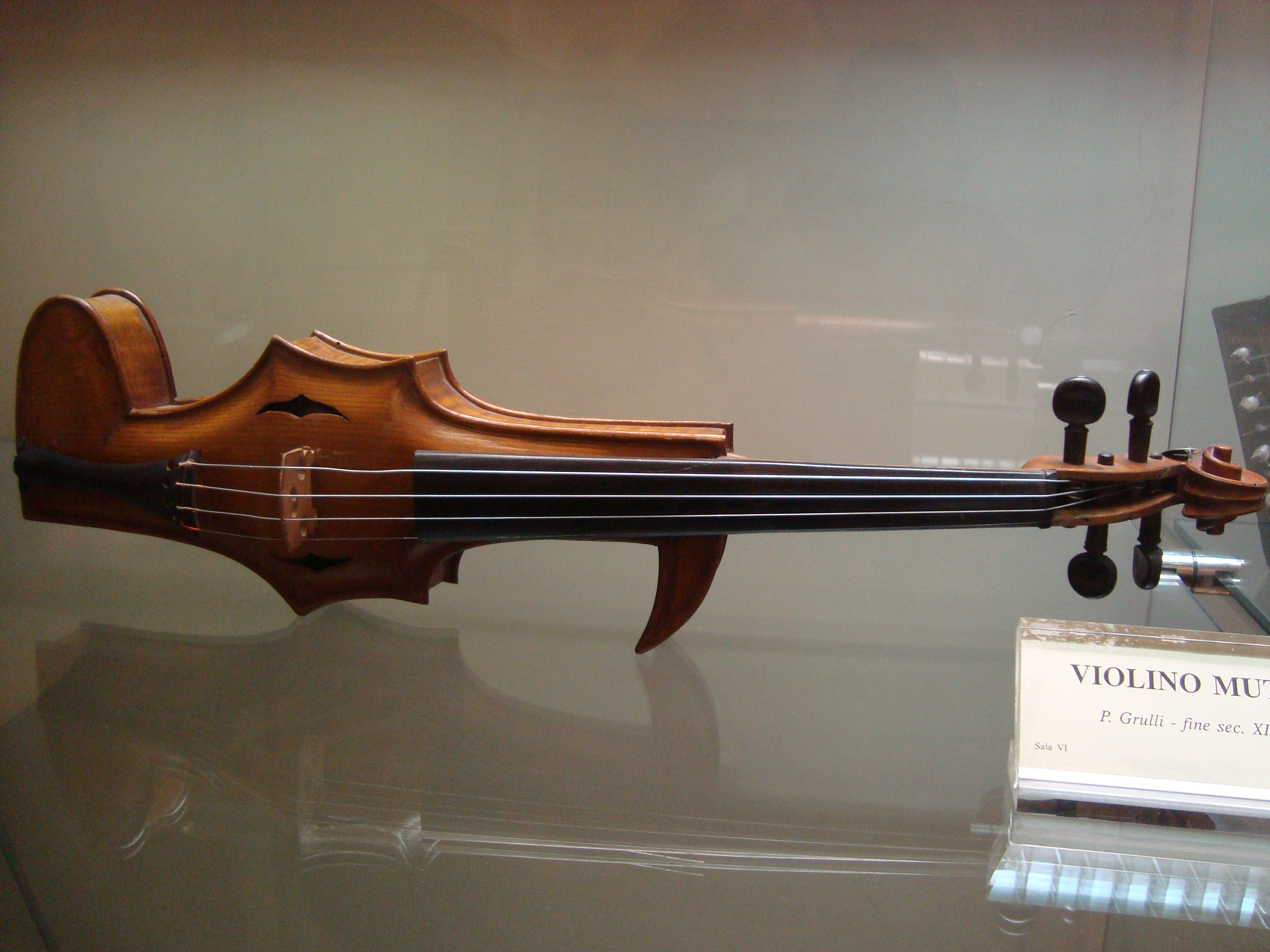
A mute violin, built by P. Grulli at the end of the 19th Century, in the collection of the Museo Nazionale degli Strumenti Musicali in Rome. This particular mute violin resembles an electric violin

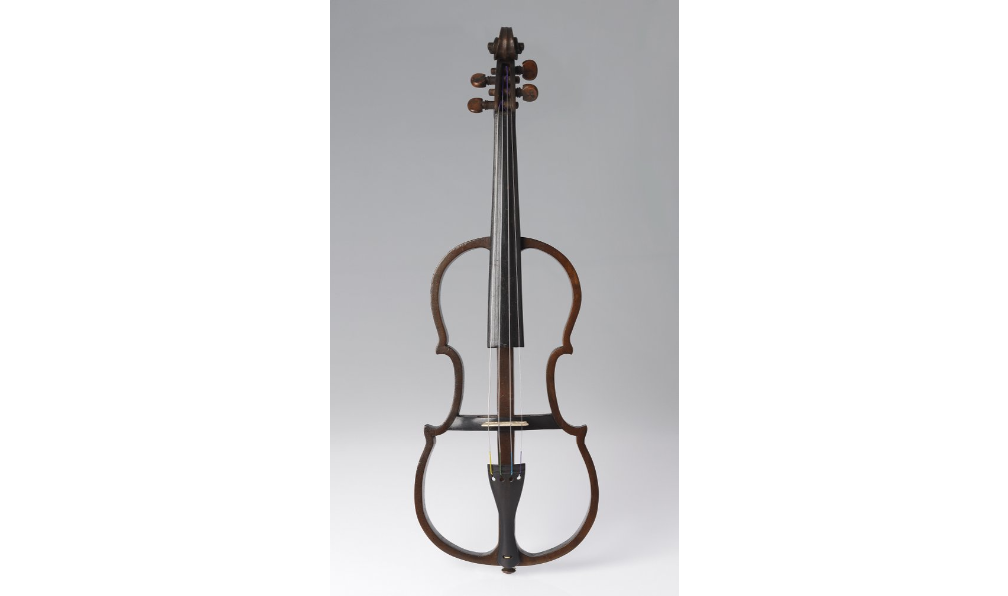
This is a mute violin from the 19th Century. And its on the display in St Cecilia's Hall.

The mute violin is a violin without or with a very shallow sound box. The instrument has a quiet, lean sound. The mute violin has historically been used by traveling musicians, and as an exercise instrument in situations where the sound of a violin is experienced as annoying by neighbouring people. Mute violins are known to exist since the eighteenth century, but their use never became widespread. Leopold Mozart made mention of the instrument in his Versuch einer gründlichen Violinschule (1756).

== Stroh violin ==
A related instrument is the Stroh violin, a combination of a mute violin and a metal horn. In contrast to the mute violin, this instrument sounds rather loud. It was used instead of the violin in the early days of phonographic recording. Nowadays, the instrument is still used by a few pop musicians and in Romanian folk music.

== Electric versions ==
In the late twentieth century intermediate forms between the mute violin and the electric violin, mute violins provided with electronics, were introduced on the market. An example is Yamaha Corporation’s ‘silent violin’, which can be connected to a pair of headphones, an amplifier or recording equipment.

The American performance artist Laurie Anderson often plays violins like these.

== An application ==
The Dutch composer Willem Pijper wanted the part of the first violin in his first string quartet of 1914 to be played by a mute violin. In a recording of his five string quartets by the Schönberg Quartet (Olympia OCD 457, 1994) the effect of the mute violin was imitated by an extra heavy sordino on an 'ordinary' violin.

== Bibliography ==
- Harrison Ryker, text in the booklet accompanying the cd Five String Quartets, Olympia OCD 457.
