= Violin Concerto No. 1 (Paganini) =

Violin concerto by Niccolò Paganini

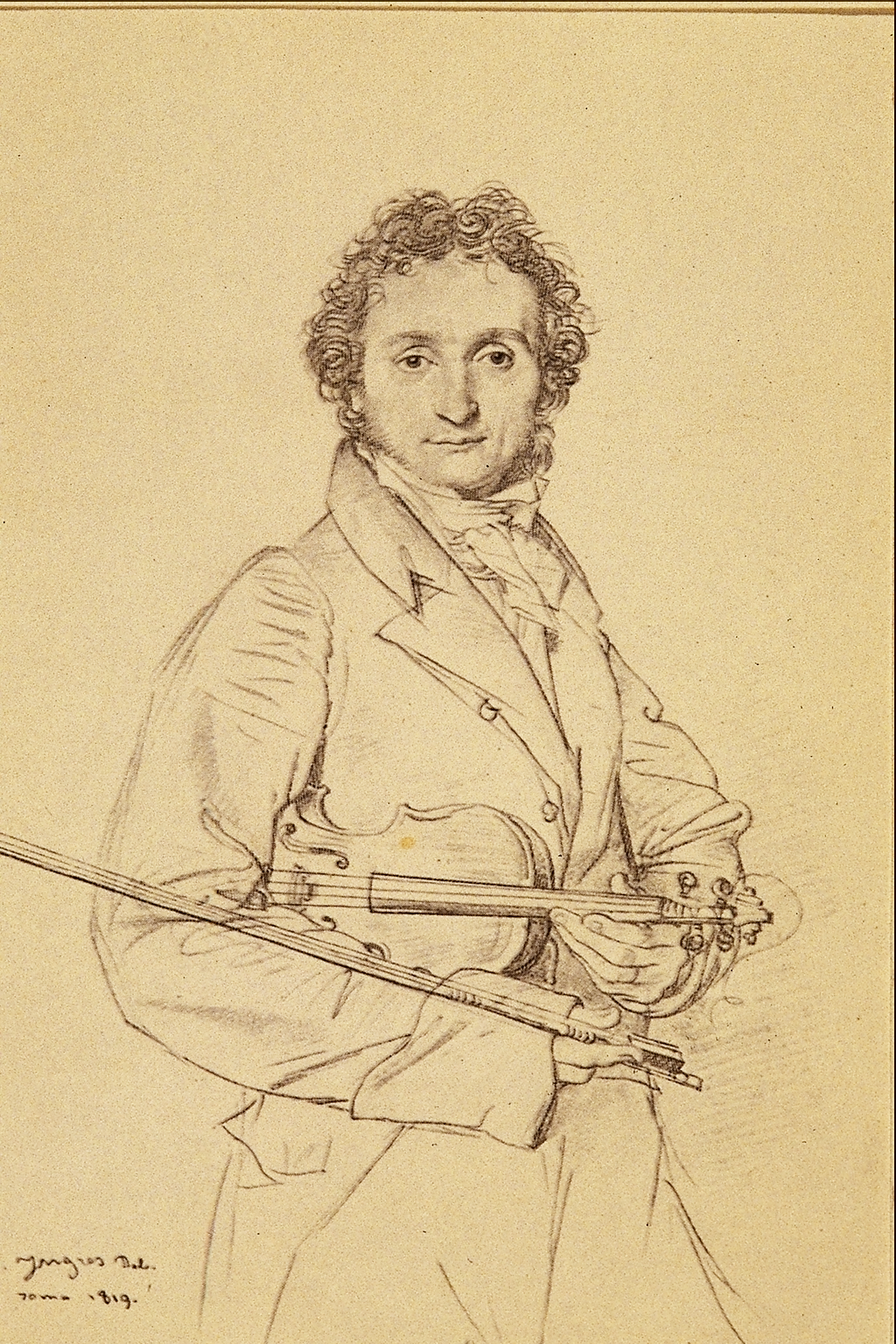
Paganini in 1818

The Violin Concerto No. 1, Op. 6, was composed by Niccolò Paganini and dates from the mid-to-late 1810s. It was premiered in Naples, Italy on 31 March 1819.

== Tonality ==
Paganini intended the Concerto to be heard in E♭ major: the orchestral parts were written in E♭, and the solo was written in D major with instructions for the violin to be tuned a semitone high, (a technique known as scordatura) enabling the soloist to achieve effects sounding in E♭ which would not be possible with normal tuning. An example of this is the opening of the third movement, where the violin plays a rapid downward scale A-G-F♯-E-D, both bowed and pizzicato, which is possible on an open D-string, but extremely difficult in the key of E♭. (i.e. playing B♭-A♭-G-F-E♭) Two strings would be required to play this downward scale, whereas only one string is required to play it in the key of D.

In addition, having the orchestra playing in E♭ appears to comparatively mute the sound of the orchestra compared to the solo violin, because the orchestral string section plays less frequently on open strings, with the result that the solo violin part emerges more clearly and brightly from the orchestral accompaniment.

While recordings in E♭ exist, most modern recordings and performances are played in the key of D.

=== Leslie Howard's arrangement ===
Scholar and musicologist Leslie Howard (known for his work on Paganini's contemporary Franz Liszt) arranged an edition of the concerto in the key of E♭, with reference both to Paganini's manuscript and the first edition. Howard's edition is the first to be published in the key of E♭ and with the solo part.

== Instrumentation ==
Paganini's original published scoring was for 1 flute, 2 oboes, 2 clarinets, 1 bassoon, 2 horns, 2 trumpets, 1 trombone, and strings.

In the years following the original publication of the work, Paganini occasionally expanded his orchestration, writing out some odd parts to add from time to time in performance: 2nd flute, contrabassoon, doubled the horns, added trombones 1 & 2 (moving the existing trombone part to trombone 3 basso), timpani, and banda turca (bass drum, crash cymbals, and suspended cymbal). He never added these into the one and only manuscript score.

== Style ==
The concerto shows the great influence of the Italian bel canto style, and especially on Paganini's younger contemporary Gioachino Rossini.

The later addition of instruments from a military band give this orchestration a distinct aggressive and militaristic sound.

== Structure ==
I. Allegro maestoso

II. Adagio

III. Rondo
Performed by Zino Francescatti and the Philadelphia Orchestra, under the baton of Eugene Ormandy

The concerto is in three movements:

1. Allegro maestoso – Tempo giusto (in D major; or E♭ major with scordatura)
2. Adagio (in B minor ending in B major; or, C minor ending in C major with scordatura)
3. Rondo. Allegro spirituoso – Un poco più presto (in D major; or E♭ major with scordatura)

Émile Sauret (1852–1920), a French violinist and composer, wrote a cadenza for the first movement, which has been described as one of the most technically difficult cadenzas.

== General References ==
- Vacchelli, Anna Maria (ed.), Howard, Leslie (arr.). (2007) Edizione nazionale delle opere di Niccolò Paganini: Primo concerto per violino e orchestra. Istituto Italiano per la Storia della Musica.
