= The Intro and the Outro =

1967 recording by the Bonzo Dog Doo-Dah Band

Song by Bonzo Dog Doo-Dah Band

from the album Gorilla
- Released: October 1967
- Length: 3:06
- Label: Liberty
- Songwriter: Vivian Stanshall
- Producers: Gerry Bron, Lyn Birkbeck

Official audio
- "The Intro and the Outro" (2007 remaster) on YouTube

"The Intro and The Outro" is a recording by the Bonzo Dog Doo-Dah Band. It appears on their debut album, Gorilla (1967). It is not so much a song as a comic monologue in which the speaker introduces the musicians who ostensibly appear on the recording. The recording fades out before the emcee completes the introductions and without the "orchestra" being able to play anything more than a vamp. The piece was written by Bonzo member Vivian Stanshall, who also provides the vocal. The Oxford English Dictionary credits this song as the first known use of the word "outro".

Stanshall first introduces the seven members of the Bonzo Dog Doo-Dah Band, who are credited with their actual instruments, over a vamp that resembles Duke Ellington’s "C Jam Blues". Following that, the imaginary line-up turns toward comedy. Some of the "musicians" named are actual performers credited with instruments that they did not play or with which they were not typically associated. Others are actors, politicians and other public figures not generally linked with musical performance in any way. Some of those named will now be unfamiliar to listeners outside mid-20th century Britain, such as Billy Butlin, Val Doonican, Max Jaffa and the comic strip character Lord Snooty from The Beano. Peter Scott, credited as playing the duck call, was a well-known British ornithologist.

== Personnel ==
According to Stanshall's monologue the Bonzos play the following instruments on the recording, although several of the band were multi-instrumentalists and may play other instruments as well.

Musicians

- "Legs" Larry Smith — drums
- Martin "Sam Spoons" Ash — rhythm pole
- Vernon Dudley Bohay-Nowell — bass guitar
- Neil Innes — piano
- Rodney Slater — alto saxophone
- Roger Ruskin Spear — tenor saxophone
- Vivian Stanshall — trumpet, spoken vocals

Technical

- Gerry Bron – producer
- Lyn Birkbeck – associate producer

As well as being mentioned in Stanshall's patter as playing the ukulele, Eric Clapton actually plays the ukulele on the recording.

=== Mentioned in the recording ===
- John Wayne – xylophone
- Robert Morley – guitar
- Billy Butlin – spoons
- Adolf Hitler – vibes ("looking very relaxed")
- Princess Anne – sousaphone
- Liberace – clarinet
- Garner Ted Armstrong – vocals
- Lord Snooty and his Pals – tap dancing
- Harold Wilson – violin
- Franklyn MacCormack – harmonica
- Eric Clapton – ukulele
- Sir Kenneth Clark – bass saxophone
- A sessions gorilla – vox humana
- The Incredible Shrinking Man – euphonium
- Peter Scott – duck call
- Casanova – horn
- General Charles de Gaulle – accordion
- Roy Rogers on Trigger
- Wild Man of Borneo – bongos
- Count Basie Orchestra – triangle
- The Rawlinsons – trombone
- Dan Druff – harp
- Quasimodo – bells
- Brainiac – banjo
- Val Doonican – "as himself"
- Max Jaffa – very appealing
- Zebra Kid and Horace Batchelor – percussion
- J. Arthur Rank – gong

== Controversies ==
The "sessions gorilla" portion of the recording originally ran "And now just arriving, Quintin Hogg on pig grunt". Hogg was a British politician at the time. He learnt of the piece prior to its release and objected to his name being used in such a context, namely the pun on his last name as "hog" (with one "g") is also another term for a pig. He managed to get Stanshall back into the studio to record the line about the sessions gorilla that is heard on the final recording. It is not known if any copies of the original version still exist. Controversy also grew out of the juxtaposition of The Princess Anne with Hitler.

== Cultural references ==
Vivian Stanshall is also known for appearing as the “Master of Ceremonies” on Mike Oldfield’s original recording of Tubular Bells, a role which involved introducing the instruments featured in the recording, most of which were played by Oldfield.

An excerpt of the song, with an adapted commentary sounding like Stanshall (actually performed by Bob Monkhouse), was used in a 1988 television advertisement, made at Passion Pictures and animated by Chuck Gammage, for the Cadbury Creme Egg.
