= The History of the Bonzos =

Greatest hits album by The Bonzo Dog Band
- Released: 1974
- Recorded: 1967–1972
- Genre: Comedy rock
- Length: 102m 26s
- Label: United Artists Records
- Producer: Various

Professional ratings
Review scores
Source	Rating
AllMusic	4.5/5 stars
Christgau's Record Guide	B−

The History of the Bonzos is a 2-disc vinyl album with 35 tracks recorded between 1967 and 1972 by The Bonzo Dog Band and the solo projects of its members, compiled by Andrew Lauder (who was head of Liberty/UA's A&R ). It was released in 1974.

== Track listing ==
Track listing as given on the original vinyl album cover, UK issue:

Side 1
No.	Title	Writer(s)	Length
1.	"The Intro and The Outro"	Viv Stanshall	3:06
2.	"Rockaliser Baby"	Stanshall, Neil Innes	3:27
3.	"Sport (The Odd Boy)"	Stanshall	3:32
4.	"Noises for the Leg"	Stanshall	2:15
5.	"King of Scurf"	Innes	4:56
6.	"Labio Dental Fricative" (Performed by Vivian Stanshall & The Sean Head Showband)	Stanshall	3:07
7.	"Hello Mabel"	Innes	2:45
8.	"Look at Me, I'm Wonderful"	Stanshall	1:45
Total length:			24:53

Side 2
No.	Title	Writer(s)	Length
1.	"Canyons of Your Mind"	Stanshall	2:45
2.	"Jollity Farm"	Leslie Sarony	2:23
3.	"You Done My Brain In"	Innes	1:40
4.	"My Pink Half of the Drainpipe"	Stanshall, Innes	3:30
5.	"Mr Apollo"	Stanshall, Innes	4:18
6.	"Hunting Tigers Out in Indiah"	Robert Hargreaves, Stanley Damerell, Tolchard Evans	3:05
7.	"Suspicion" (Performed by Vivian Stanshall & His Gargantuan Chums)	Doc Pomus, Mort Shuman	3:30
8.	"Mr Slater's Parrot"	Stanshall	2:18
9.	"Laughing Blues"	Mike Bradley	3:35
10.	"Narcissus"	Ethelbert Nevin	0:20
Total length:			27:34

Side 3
No.	Title	Writer(s)	Length
1.	"I'm the Urban Spaceman"	Innes	2:23
2.	"Bad Blood"	Stanshall	5:10
3.	"I Left My Heart in San Francisco"	George Cory, Douglass Cross	1:02
4.	"Tent"	Stanshall	3:20
5.	"Can Blue Men Sing the Whites?"	Stanshall	2:48
6.	"9 - 5 Pollution Blues" (Performed by The World)	Innes	4:20
7.	"Big Shot"	Stanshall	3:22
8.	"Release Me" (Performed by Roger Ruskin Spear & His Giant Kinetic Wardrobe)	Eddie Miller, Robert Yount, James Pebworth (as Dub Williams)	2:50
Total length:			25:15

Side 4
No.	Title	Writer(s)	Length
1.	"We Are Normal"	Stanshall, Innes	4:50
2.	"The Sound of Music"	Richard Rodgers, Oscar Hammerstein II	1:02
3.	"Kama-Sutra"	Stanshall, Innes	0:39
4.	"Rhinocratic Oaths"	Stanshall, Innes	3:23
5.	"Shirt"	Roger Ruskin Spear	4:29
6.	"Mickey's Son and Daughter"	Edward Lisbona, Tommie Connor	2:39
7.	"Blind Date" (Performed by Vivian Stanshall & biG Grunt)	Stanshall	3:05
8.	"Trouser Press"	Spear	2:17
9.	"Slush"	Innes	2:20
Total length:			24:44
