= Unpeeled (Bonzo Dog Band album) =

Compilation album by The Bonzo Dog Band
- Released: 1995
- Genre: Comedy rock
- Label: Strange Fruit Records (UK)

Professional ratings
Review scores
Source	Rating
AllMusic	3/5 stars

Unpeeled is a 1995 compilation of sessions recorded by The Bonzo Dog Band for the John Peel show on the BBC during the late sixties.

== Track listing ==
1. "Do the Trouser Press" (Roger Ruskin Spear) – 02:19
2. "Canyons of Your Mind" (Vivian Stanshall) – 03:09
3. "I'm the Urban Spaceman" (Neil Innes) – 02:38
4. "Hello Mabel" (Innes) – 02:41
5. "Mr Apollo" (Stanshall, Innes) – 04:17
6. "Tent" (Stanshall) – 02:37
7. "Monster Mash" (Bobby (Boris) Pickett, Leonard Capizzi) – 03:13
8. "Give Booze a Chance" (John Lennon) (cover of "Give Peace a Chance") 01:18
9. "We Were Wrong" (Stanshall) – 02:21
10. "Keynsham" (Innes) – 01:45
11. "I Want to Be With You" (Innes) – 02:04
12. "Mickey's Son and Daughter" (Edward Lisbona, Tommy Connor) – 02:39
13. "The Craig Torso Show" – 05:14
14. "Can Blue Men Sing the Whites?" (Stanshall) – 02:39
15. "Look at Me I'm Wonderful" (Stanshall) – 02:52
16. "Quiet Talk and Summer Walks" (Innes) – 03:40

== Personnel ==
- Vivian Stanshall, "Legs" Larry Smith, David Clague, Dennis Cowan, Neil Innes, Rodney Slater, Roger Ruskin Spear, Sam Spoons, Vernon Dudley Bohay-Nowell
- Liner Notes: John Peel
