= Rodney Slater =

Rodney Slater may refer to:

- Rodney Slater (musician) (born 1941), member of the Bonzo Dog Doo-Dah Band
- Rodney E. Slater (born 1955), former United States Secretary of Transportation
