= Beast of the Bonzos =

Greatest hits album by Bonzo Dog Band
- Released: 1971
- Genre: Comedy rock
- Label: United Artists Records UAS 5517
- Compiler: Martin Cerf, John Mendelsohn

Beast of the Bonzos is the US version of the UK album The Best of the Bonzos. This American best of album differs from the British in having different cover art, an extra flap with an article about the Bonzos by John Mendelsohn, and about half different songs.

== Track listing ==
=== Side One ===
1. "The Intro and the Outro"
2. "We are Normal"
3. "I Left My Heart in San Francisco"
4. "Tubas in the Moonlight"
5. "Rockaliser Baby"
6. "Piggy Bank Love"
7. "Hello Mabel"
8. "I'm the Urban Spaceman"

=== Side Two ===
1. "Mr. Apollo"
2. "Sport, the Odd Boy"
3. "Trouser Press"
4. "Rhinocratic Oaths"
5. "Look at Me, I'm Wonderful"
6. "Quiet Talks and Summer Walks"
7. "Canyons of Your Mind"
