= His Name Is Legs (Ladies and Gentlemen) =

Song by George Harrison

from the album Extra Texture (Read All About It)
- Released: 22 September 1975
- Genre: Funk rock
- Length: 5:46
- Label: Apple
- Songwriter(s): George Harrison
- Producer(s): George Harrison

"His Name Is Legs (Ladies and Gentlemen)" is a song by English rock musician George Harrison, released in 1975 as the closing track of his album Extra Texture (Read All About It). The song is a tribute to "Legs" Larry Smith, the drummer with the 1960s satirical-comedy group the Bonzo Dog Doo-Dah Band and one of many comedians with whom Harrison began associating during the 1970s. Smith appears on the recording, delivering a spoken monologue, while Harrison's lyrics similarly reflect the comedian's penchant for zany wordplay. The song serves as a precursor to Harrison's work with Monty Python members Eric Idle and Michael Palin, including his production of the troupe's 1975 single "The Lumberjack Song" and films such as Life of Brian (1979) that he produced under the aegis of his company HandMade Films.

Harrison recorded "His Name Is Legs" at his Friar Park home studio during sessions for his 1974 album Dark Horse. The song remained unfinished until he returned to it the following year while working in Los Angeles on Extra Texture. Aside from Harrison and Smith, the musicians on the recording include Tom Scott, Billy Preston, Willie Weeks and Andy Newmark, all of whom were part of Harrison's 1974 tour band. The song's arrangement reflects Harrison's adoption of the funk genre.

As with the album's humorous artwork, the inclusion of "His Name Is Legs" on Extra Texture marked a rare example of light-heartedness among a collection of mostly downbeat songs. Several commentators view the track as an indulgence by Harrison. These detractors cite the in-joke nature of the composition, together with the largely unintelligible vocals on the recording. Harrison acknowledged that the song's appeal might be limited to "maybe two people".

== Background ==
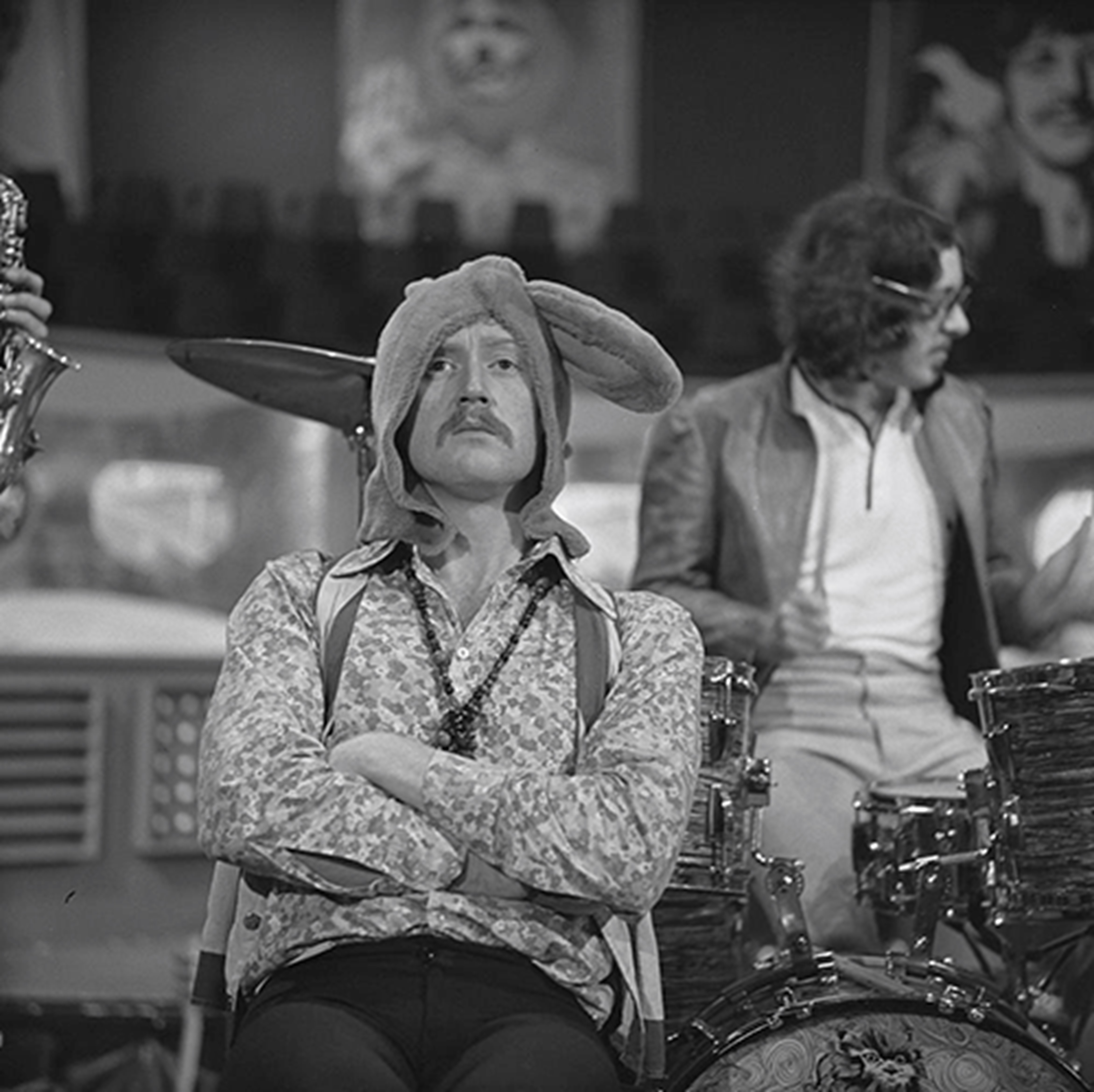
The Bonzos' Vivian Stanshall and drummer "Legs" Larry Smith in 1969

Although often noted for the serious, religious nature of his song lyrics, George Harrison was an avowed fan of British comedy, beginning with Peter Sellers and Spike Milligan's work in The Goon Show during the 1950s. In his autobiography, I, Me, Mine, Harrison writes of comedy – specifically, Monty Python's first TV series and the satirical Bonzo Dog Doo-Dah Band – as having "filled that empty space for me" in the late 1960s, when relationships with his Beatles bandmates had fractured. The Bonzo Dog Band (as they became known in 1969) were a favourite of the Beatles, who cast the group in their 1967 TV film Magical Mystery Tour. Harrison subsequently performed with the Bonzos' drummer, "Legs" Larry Smith, along with Eric Clapton and other members of Delaney & Bonnie and Friends, at John Lennon's "Peace for Christmas" charity concert, held at London's Lyceum Ballroom in December 1969. In I, Me, Mine, Harrison suggests an alternative scenario to the Beatles' 1970 break-up: "What should have happened is that the Bonzos and the Beatles ... turned into one great Rutle band with all the Pythons and had a laugh."

By 1973, Sellers and Milligan were among the comedians who formed part of Harrison's social circle at his Friar Park estate in Henley-on-Thames, Oxfordshire. This period coincided with the end of his marriage to Pattie Boyd, who has described their home as "a madhouse" during their final year together. Harrison became reacquainted with Smith through longtime Beatles aide Terry Doran. (Note: Smith recalls that he and Harrison shared a fascination for the Mel Brooks film The Producers, which they watched "every night" at Friar Park.) Harrison admired Smith as "a wonderfully eccentric person", a quality that had similarly inspired him about Sir Frank Crisp, the original owner of Friar Park. Author Dale Allison suggests that Smith became a court jester figure for Harrison, who wrote the song "His Name Is Legs (Ladies and Gentlemen)" as a tribute to Smith. In his autobiography, Harrison terms the composition "a piece of personal indulgence, like some other of my songs about things nobody else knows or cares about, except maybe two people".

== Composition ==
He's a wonderfully eccentric person ... He dresses crazily and says very funny things ... He'd say "Hello sausage" and things like: "everything's dinky doo". I thought "hello! this guy's funny".

– George Harrison, on Legs Larry Smith, 1979

Harrison wrote "His Name Is Legs" around Christmastime in 1973, on a piano at Friar Park. Author Ian Inglis describes it as a song "peppered with oblique references and in-jokes about [Smith's] idiosyncratic mannerisms and behavior". Harrison's lyrics incorporate some of Smith's favourite sayings, the first verse beginning:

Everything is dinky doo
Everything that you do
You the King of Lah di da
Pretty very out far ...

Examples of Smith's penchant for zany wordplay include the lines "Never over-sits he under-stands" and "Get lined up come Sikh come Czar" – the latter being partly a misappropriation of the French phrase "comme ci comme ça". In the second verse, the line "People think he's loopy loo when they look at his shoes" refers to the comedian's unusual dress sense, which included "toy cows grazing on his shoes", according to Harrison biographer Alan Clayson, while "rocking sausage roll" was Smith's phrase for rock 'n' roll.

The song title appears in the two bridge sections, the first of which states:

Everyone from Oxford town
Way down to the Rio Grande
Knows his harbour quays, his skintight hands
Are without seggs, his name is Legs.

Musically, the composition is in the funk rock style, while the device of introducing Smith to listeners recalls the show tune aspect of Harrison's collaboration with Mal Evans, "You and Me (Babe)", which closed former Beatle Ringo Starr's 1973 album Ringo. In the lyrics to "His Name Is Legs", Harrison biographer Simon Leng recognises the same "nonsense word games" favoured by Monty Python. Leng comments that the latter's composition "The Lumberjack Song" particularly resonated with Harrison during this period, as he sought to challenge the public's perception of him as a Beatle, in the same way that Michael Palin's character in the Python song challenged the stereotypes associated with an "all-action" lumberjack. (Note: Leng sees other overlaps between Harrison's attempts to establish his identity, separate from his Beatle past, and the insights offered in Monty Python's work, particularly in their sketch "Arthur 'Two Sheds' Jackson". During that sketch, an arts show interviewer repeatedly ignores Jackson's work as a composer of modern symphonies, concentrating instead on the trivial questions of how he acquired his nickname and whether he owns two garden sheds.)

== Recording ==
=== 1974 basic track ===
In the main hall there was a Steinway grand piano, and he burst in, sat down, gave me a nod, and started playing this song … I was greatly touched by the whole thing.

– Legs Larry Smith, 2014

Harrison taped "His Name Is Legs (Ladies and Gentlemen)" during sessions for his 1974 album Dark Horse, but it was one of a number of tracks he left unfinished. The sessions took place at his Friar Park studio, FPSHOT, in August–September that year, with Phil McDonald as recording engineer. Harrison played piano and electric guitar on the recording; the other musicians were Billy Preston (electric piano), Tom Scott (saxophones), Willie Weeks (bass) and Andy Newmark (drums). These four musicians then joined Harrison for tour rehearsals in Los Angeles, where he rushed to complete Dark Horse before undertaking a much-anticipated North American tour with Ravi Shankar. With Peter Sellers among his entourage, Harrison alternatively adopted comedy and his Hindu-aligned spiritual goals as a defence against expectations related to his Beatle past during the tour. (Note: As well as opening his shows with the theme from Monty Python's Flying Circus, Harrison quoted the lyrics to "The Lumberjack Song" to interviewers such as Ben Fong-Torres from Rolling Stone magazine, while citing Gandhi's exhortation to "create and preserve the image of your choice". For his part, Harrison chose to promote the image of a devoted servant of the Hindu god Krishna.)

When discussing "His Name Is Legs" with BBC Radio 1 DJ Paul Gambaccini in September 1975, Harrison said that after recording the basic track, he invited Smith to sing the first two lines of each of the bridges. Smith did these vocal parts in two takes, and improvised dialogue through the rest of the song each time. In Clayson's description, Smith sang the bridge sections in English "officer-and-gentleman tones" and adopted an American accent for the monologues.

=== 1975 overdubs ===
Even if you see [the words] written down, you still won't understand them. It's the craziest song – both lyrically and musically.

– Harrison discussing "His Name Is Legs" with Paul Gambaccini, Rockweek, September 1975

Harrison returned to the track in April 1975 when recording his album Extra Texture (Read All About It) at A&M Studios in Los Angeles. The sessions coincided with a period that author Gary Tillery describes as a "spiritual funk" for Harrison, in reaction to scathing reviews for his 1974 tour and the Dark Horse album. Harrison's despondency was alleviated by his new relationship with Olivia Arias, and a friendship begun with Monty Python star Eric Idle immediately after the Los Angeles premiere of the film Monty Python and the Holy Grail. Idle has spoken of them sharing "a dialogue that went on for about 48 hours" following the premiere, which led to Harrison producing a re-recording of "The Lumberjack Song" in London, in October 1975, for release as a UK single. The pair then wrote a comical sea shanty called "The Pirate Song" for a sketch in Rutland Weekend Television, Idle's TV show with Neil Innes, Smith's former bandmate. (Note: Harrison was keen to help establish Monty Python in the United States and, according to Michael Palin, he "envisaged a Harrison–Pythons road show with us doing really extraordinary things throughout the show, such as swinging out over the audience on wires".)

Overdubs on the 1974 basic track for "His Name Is Legs" included tack piano, played by Canadian musician David Foster, and a new horn arrangement, played by Scott and Chuck Findley, another member of Harrison's tour band the previous year. Scott and Findley recorded their contributions at A&M Studios over 2–3 June, with each musician overdubbing two horn parts.

The released recording begins with an introductory bass riff from Weeks, which is then joined by Foster's tack piano. Commentators note the lack of clarity in the mix, which author Elliot Huntley attributes to the "three-pronged piano attack" and the low level of Harrison and Smith's vocals. At times during the sections featuring Smith's improvised dialogue, Harrison let both recorded takes run simultaneously, and he admitted to Gambaccini that he chose to mix the track in this way "so people have to strain with headphones to hear what it is".

== Release and reception ==
Inner sleeve for the Extra Texture LP; copyright Apple Records

"His Name Is Legs" was released on 22 September 1975 as the final track on Extra Texture (Read All About It). Together with Roy Kohara's album artwork, which "tried to incorporate a 'wacky' theme", according to authors Chip Madinger and Mark Easter, the song's inclusion contrasted with the melancholic musical content of Extra Texture. The artwork included an inner-sleeve photo of Harrison "grin[ning] like a Monty Python choirboy", in the words of Village Voice critic Robert Christgau, while the face labels credited production to "Ohnothimagen" (Oh, not him again) and showed the Apple Records logo reduced to an apple core. (Note: The customised Apple logo presaged the company's closing, Extra Texture being the final studio album released on the label.) With the "Ohnothimagen" moniker, which also appeared below the LP's inner-sleeve photo and in advertising for the album, Harrison acknowledged his recent unpopularity with music critics. While this gesture was intended as self-deprecation on Harrison's part, Smith has cited it as an example of Harrison's lack of confidence at the time and his need for "a cuddle now and then". Smith was listed in the performer credits as appearing "courtesy of the Oxfordshire County Council".

Author Robert Rodriguez describes "His Name Is Legs" as a "comedy number" and "a self-indulgent in-joke" that appeared to show Harrison "doubling down on efforts to alienate his audience", after the bad press he had received over the winter of 1974–75. On release, Dave Marsh of Rolling Stone said that the song "might be Harrison's way of countering charges of humorlessness" but that "since neither Smith nor Harrison is very funny, it does more to confirm the charges." In the NME, Neil Spencer referred to the image of Harrison with "a chirpy smirk plastered across his dial" as "misleading", given the album's overall mood, and added: "'His Names Is Legs (Ladies and Gentlemen)' is the odd track out because it's (ulp) not serious. It seems like an attempt to recapture some of the innocent light-heartedness of Beatle days." Ray Coleman of Melody Maker predicted that Extra Texture would "re-establish [Harrison] as a powerful artist with an ear for unusual but attractive tunes allied to some quirky lyrics", and he described the closing song as an "up-tempo splash of fun, and it jumps, too".

In the 1978 edition of their book The Beatles: An Illustrated Record, Roy Carr and Tony Tyler said that Harrison had "desperately" employed "last-minute devices" to save Extra Texture, by featuring "'zany' ex-Bonzo Dog Band drummer 'Legs' Larry Smith on a track, and by instructing his graphic designers to 'get a little humour into the packaging'. They do; and 'Legs' duly sings; but it is all too little, too late." Writing in 1981, NME critic Bob Woffinden identified the song and the album art, as well as the single "You", as evidence that Harrison was attempting to re-engage with his listeners. Woffinden welcomed this approach but, noting the lack of a lyric sheet with the album, he added: "['His Name Is Legs'] is not a success, since most of the vocals are lost in the raucous mix; Larry might have had pearls of wisdom to impart, but who could tell?" More recently, Richard Ginell of AllMusic has described the song as a "baffling salute" to Smith, while former Mojo editor Mat Snow dismisses it as "a throwaway among throwaways".

Also writing for AllMusic, Lindsay Planer views "His Name Is Legs" as "somewhat silly but nonetheless thoroughly entertaining", a song that "[allows] Harrison the opportunity to close the disc on a lighter note and unleash his admittedly askew and undeniably rich sense of humor". In his review for Rough Guides, Chris Ingham calls the track a "manically intricate tribute" and considers it to be a redeeming feature of Extra Texture, along with "Tired of Midnight Blue". Writing for Goldmine magazine in January 2002, Dave Thompson described it as "whacked" and "a six-minute semi-jam" that should not be "overlook[ed]".

== Legacy ==
Snow, Huntley and Inglis each discuss "His Name Is Legs" as a precedent for Harrison's well-received work with Idle. Snow writes that, as unlikely as it seemed during Harrison's fallow period of 1975, "surreal English comedy would provide him with a new career." Aside from Harrison's production of "The Lumberjack Song", for which he again used the Ohnothimagen moniker, their collaborations began with his guest appearance on Rutland Weekend Television, which aired on BBC2 on 26 December 1975. In 1978, Harrison participated in The Rutles: All You Need Is Cash, a TV film starring Idle, Innes and Palin that satirised the Beatles' history, and he formed HandMade Films that year in order to fund the production of Monty Python's third movie, Life of Brian (1979), in which he also appeared. HandMade became Britain's most successful independent film company and went on to make other films involving one or more members of Monty Python, including Time Bandits (1981), The Missionary (1982), A Private Function (1984) and Nuns on the Run (1990). (Note: Harrison also joined the Pythons on stage in New York in April 1976, as part of the chorus in "The Lumberjack Song", and later produced their show at the Hollywood Bowl.)

Leng recognises an increasing Python-based comedy influence in Harrison's songwriting and musical arrangements, beginning with his 1979 track "Soft-Hearted Hana" and subsequently including "Save the World", with that song's "groove … horn charts and moog riffs" reminiscent of "His Name Is Legs", and "Greece". Following his guest appearance on "His Name Is Legs", Smith became part of a coterie of local musicians known as the Henley Music Mafia, which also included Harrison, Alvin Lee, Jon Lord and Joe Brown. Smith appeared in the HandMade comedy Bullshot (1983) and also designed the cover for Harrison's 1982 album Gone Troppo.

== Personnel ==
- George Harrison – vocals, piano, electric guitar, backing vocals
- Legs Larry Smith – vocals
- Billy Preston – electric piano
- Tom Scott – saxophones, horn arrangement
- Chuck Findley – trumpet, trombone
- Willie Weeks – bass
- Andy Newmark – drums, shaker
- David Foster – tack piano

== Sources ==
- Dale C. Allison Jr., The Love There That's Sleeping: The Art and Spirituality of George Harrison, Continuum (New York, NY, 2006; ISBN 978-0-8264-1917-0).
- Keith Badman, The Beatles Diary Volume 2: After the Break-Up 1970–2001, Omnibus Press (London, 2001; ISBN 0-7119-8307-0).
- Pattie Boyd with Penny Junor, Wonderful Today: The Autobiography, Headline Review (London, 2007; ISBN 978-0-7553-1646-5).
- Roy Carr & Tony Tyler, The Beatles: An Illustrated Record, Trewin Copplestone Publishing (London, 1978; ISBN 0-450-04170-0).
- Harry Castleman & Walter J. Podrazik, All Together Now: The First Complete Beatles Discography 1961–1975, Ballantine Books (New York, NY, 1976; ISBN 0-345-25680-8).
- Alan Clayson, George Harrison, Sanctuary (London, 2003; ISBN 1-86074-489-3).
- Peter Doggett, You Never Give Me Your Money: The Beatles After the Breakup, It Books (New York, NY, 2011; ISBN 978-0-06-177418-8).
- The Editors of Rolling Stone, Harrison, Rolling Stone Press/Simon & Schuster (New York, NY, 2002; ISBN 0-7432-3581-9).
- Joshua M. Greene, Here Comes the Sun: The Spiritual and Musical Journey of George Harrison, John Wiley & Sons (Hoboken, NJ, 2006; ISBN 978-0-470-12780-3).
- George Harrison, I Me Mine, Chronicle Books (San Francisco, CA, 2002; ISBN 0-8118-3793-9).
- Olivia Harrison, George Harrison: Living in the Material World, Abrams (New York, NY, 2011; ISBN 978-1-4197-0220-4).
- Bill Harry, The George Harrison Encyclopedia, Virgin Books (London, 2003; ISBN 978-0-753508220).
- Elliot J. Huntley, Mystical One: George Harrison – After the Break-up of the Beatles, Guernica Editions (Toronto, ON, 2006; ISBN 1-55071-197-0).
- Chris Ingham, The Rough Guide to the Beatles, Rough Guides/Penguin (London, 2006; 2nd edn; ISBN 978-1-84836-525-4).
- Ian Inglis, The Words and Music of George Harrison, Praeger (Santa Barbara, CA, 2010; ISBN 978-0-313-37532-3).
- Peter Lavezzoli, The Dawn of Indian Music in the West, Continuum (New York, NY, 2006; ISBN 0-8264-2819-3).
- Simon Leng, While My Guitar Gently Weeps: The Music of George Harrison, Hal Leonard (Milwaukee, WI, 2006; ISBN 1-4234-0609-5).
- Ian MacDonald, Revolution in the Head: The Beatles' Records and the Sixties, Pimlico (London, 1998; ISBN 0-7126-6697-4).
- Thomas MacFarlane, The Music of George Harrison, Routledge (Abingdon, UK, 2019; ISBN 978-1-138-59910-9).
- Chip Madinger & Mark Easter, Eight Arms to Hold You: The Solo Beatles Compendium, 44.1 Productions (Chesterfield, MO, 2000; ISBN 0-615-11724-4).
- Douglas McCall, Monty Python: A Chronology, 1969–2012, McFarland (Jefferson, NC, 2014; ISBN 978-0-7864-7811-8).
- Barry Miles, The Beatles Diary Volume 1: The Beatles Years, Omnibus Press (London, 2001; ISBN 0-7119-8308-9).
- The Pythons, The Pythons Autobiography, Orion (London, 2005; ISBN 978-0-7528-6425-9).
- Robert Rodriguez, Fab Four FAQ 2.0: The Beatles' Solo Years, 1970–1980, Backbeat Books (Milwaukee, WI, 2010; ISBN 978-1-4165-9093-4).
- Nicholas Schaffner, The Beatles Forever, McGraw-Hill (New York, NY, 1978; ISBN 0-07-055087-5).
- Mat Snow, The Beatles Solo: The Illustrated Chronicles of John, Paul, George, and Ringo After The Beatles (Volume 3: George), Race Point Publishing (New York, NY, 2013; ISBN 978-1-937994-26-6).
- Bruce Spizer, The Beatles Solo on Apple Records, 498 Productions (New Orleans, LA, 2005; ISBN 0-9662649-5-9).
- Gary Tillery, Working Class Mystic: A Spiritual Biography of George Harrison, Quest Books (Wheaton, IL, 2011; ISBN 978-0-8356-0900-5).
- Bob Woffinden, The Beatles Apart, Proteus (London, 1981; ISBN 0-906071-89-5).
