= Gorilla (Bonzo Dog Doo-Dah Band album) =

Studio album by Bonzo Dog Doo-Dah Band
- Released: October 1967
- Genres: Comedy; satire; trad jazz; music hall; psychedelic pop
- Length: 35:25
- Labels: Liberty; BGO Records (Reissue)
- Producers: Gerry Bron, Lyn Birkbeck

Bonzo Dog Doo-Dah Band chronology
Gorilla (1967)	The Doughnut in Granny's Greenhouse (1968)

British reissue
- Sunset SLS 50160

Professional ratings
Review scores
Source	Rating
AllMusic	3/5 stars
The Encyclopedia of Popular Music	5/5 stars
Rolling Stone	Positive
The Rolling Stone Record Guide	3/5 stars

Gorilla is the debut album by Bonzo Dog Doo-Dah Band, released by Liberty Records, LBL 83056, in 1967. In 2007, EMI reissued the album on CD with seven bonus tracks.

== Musical style ==
The album includes "Jazz, (Delicious Hot, Disgusting Cold)" which savagely parodied their early "trad" jazz roots and featured some of the most deliberately inept jazz playing ever recorded—the record company only allowed two hours of studio time per track, so it was completed in a single take to allow for the far more complex "The Intro and the Outro". The band deliberately swapped instruments to increase the degree of incompetence.

In "The Intro and the Outro" every member of the band was introduced and played a solo, starting with genuine band members, before including such improbable members as John Wayne on xylophone, Adolf Hitler on vibes, and J. Arthur Rank on gong. Other 'band members' included Val Doonican, Horace Batchelor and Lord Snooty and His Pals.

The versatility of the band is shown in the wide variety of styles parodied on the album: as well as trad jazz noted above, there is 1920s-style music ("Jollity Farm", "I'm Bored"), Beatles music of the "Penny Lane" era ("The Equestrian Statue"), lounge music ("San Francisco"), calypso ("Look Out There's a Monster Coming"), Elvis Presley ("Death-cab for Cutie"), music hall ("Mickey's Son and Daughter"), film noir ("Big Shot"), Wurlitzer ("Music for the Head Ballet"), and bubblegum ("Piggy Bank Love").

== Recording ==
The album was recorded on a four-track tape recorder, as was typical for the UK in 1967. Due to the limited number of tracks, most of the non-band "personnel" on "The Intro and the Outro" are simply faded in and out, and few notice they are absent in the later stages of the track.

== Legacy ==
The song "Death Cab for Cutie" inspired the name of the band of the same name.

== Track listing ==
Side one

1. "Cool Britannia" (Vivian Stanshall, Neil Innes) – 1:00
2. "The Equestrian Statue" (Innes) – 2:49
3. "Jollity Farm" (Leslie Sarony) – 2:29
4. "I Left My Heart in San Francisco" (George Cory. Douglass Cross) – 1:04
5. "Look Out, There's a Monster Coming" (Stanshall) – 2:55
6. "Jazz, Delicious Hot, Disgusting Cold" (Bonzo Dog Band) – 3:11
7. "Death Cab for Cutie" (Stanshall, Innes) – 2:56
8. "Narcissus" (Ethelbert Nevin) – 0:27

Side two

1. "The Intro and the Outro" (Stanshall) – 3:04
2. "Mickey's Son and Daughter" (Eddie Lisbonna, Tommie Connor) – 2:43
3. "Big Shot" (Stanshall) – 3:31
4. "Music for the Head Ballet" (Innes) – 1:45
5. "Piggy Bank Love" (Innes) – 3:04
6. "I'm Bored" (Stanshall) – 3:06
7. "The Sound of Music" (Oscar Hammerstein II, Richard Rodgers) – 1:21

== US version ==
The album was issued in the US on Imperial as LP-9370 (mono) and LP-12370 (stereo), but minus the track "Big Shot". The original issue of the album had the same booklet issued with the UK album.

== Bonus tracks on 2007 CD reissue ==
1. "My Brother Makes the Noises for the Talkies"
2. "I'm Gonna Bring a Watermelon to My Girl Tonight"
3. "Ali Baba's Camel" (previously unreleased, early version)
4. "On Her Doorstep Last Night" (Hargreaves, Damerell, Tilsley)
5. "Alley Oop"
6. "Button Up Your Overcoat"
7. "The Craig Torso Show" (I Remember You/With a Little Help from My Friends/I Left My Heart in San Francisco/Oh Carol)

== Sleeve notes (Stanshall) ==
"Dedicated to Kong who must have been a great bloke."

== Personnel ==
Musicians

- Vivian Stanshall – lead vocals, trumpet, euphonium, tuba, ukulele
- Neil Innes – piano, harpsichord, guitar, backing vocals, lead vocals on "The Equestrian Statue"
- Vernon Dudley Bowhay-Nowell – bass guitar, banjo, baritone saxophone, bass saxophone, whistle
- Rodney Slater – alto saxophone, baritone saxophone, bass saxophone, clarinet, trombone, bass clarinet
- Sam Spoons – double bass, percussion, spoons
- "Legs" Larry Smith – drums, tuba, tap dance
- Roger Ruskin Spear – tenor saxophone, trumpet, xylophone, bells
- Dave Clague – bass guitar (on unconfirmed tracks)

Technical

- Gerry Bron – producer
- Lyn Birkbeck – associate producer
- Roger Ruskin Spear – engineer
- Neil Innes – musical director
- Vivian Stanshall – cover design, liner notes
