= The Doughnut in Granny's Greenhouse =

Studio album by Bonzo Dog Band
- Released: November 1968
- Studio: Morgan, London
- Genre: Comedy rock, psychedelic pop, avant-garde
- Length: 38:30
- Label: Liberty (UK); Imperial (US)
- Producer: Gus Dudgeon; Gerry Bron

Bonzo Dog Band chronology
Gorilla (1967)	The Doughnut in Granny's Greenhouse (1968)	Tadpoles (1969)

Professional ratings
Review scores
Source	Rating
AllMusic	4.5/5 stars
Rolling Stone	positive
The Village Voice	B

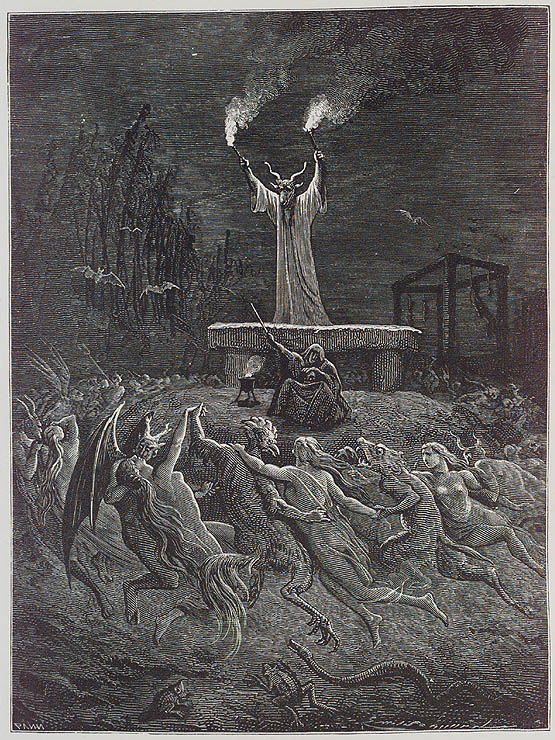
Depiction of the traditional Witches' Sabbath as evoked vividly in the track Eleven Moustachioed Daughters (Engraving La danse du Sabbat, artist Émile Bayard: Illustration from History of Magic by Paul Christian, Paris, 1870)

The Doughnut in Granny's Greenhouse is the second album by the British comedy rock group Bonzo Dog Doo-Dah Band. In the United States, it was released as Urban Spaceman and added their U.K. hit single "I'm the Urban Spaceman" to the track listing.

== Background ==
By 1968, the group's sound had expanded beyond their music hall and jazz roots, drawing inspiration from the blues and psychedelic rock movements that had grown in popularity at the time. They recorded the album at the newly established Morgan Studios in London. The phrase "the doughnut in granny's greenhouse" is obscure British slang for the lavatory. The band first heard it when Michael Palin told them a joke featuring it.

The chorus of "We Are Normal" features the lyric "We are normal and we want our freedom", a reference to a line from the 1963 play The Persecution and Assassination of Jean-Paul Marat as Performed by the Inmates of the Asylum of Charenton Under the Direction of the Marquis de Sade or Marat/Sade, also quoted in "The Red Telephone", a song by the American band Love from their 1967 album Forever Changes. The track also features the playful rhyming interjection "We are normal and we dig Bert Weedon" in which Stanshall pays fleeting tribute to one of the most influential guitarists of his day.

The track 11 Moustachioed Daughters is a darkly comic (and remarkably detailed) evocation of the traditional Witches' Sabbath and features lyrics referencing the traditional hallucinogenic flying ointment prepared from Atropa belladonna (and other Solanaceous plants - including the fabled mandrake, said to shriek when uprooted). Stylistically, the track is also a homage to the original 1963 recording "The Feast of the Mau-Mau", by one of Vivian Stanshall's favourite musical artists Screamin' Jay Hawkins.

In 2007 the U.K. version of "Doughnut" was re-issued by EMI on CD with 5 bonus rare or unreleased tracks.

== Sleeve notes ==
The instruction that "The noises of your bodies are a part of this record." can be found on the booklet that came with the gatefold edition.

== Track listing ==
Side 1
No.	Title	Writer(s)	Length
1.	"We Are Normal"	Innes, Stanshall	4:49
2.	"Postcard"	Innes, Stanshall	4:23
3.	"Beautiful Zelda"	Innes	2:25
4.	"Can Blue Men Sing the Whites"	Stanshall	2:49
5.	"Hello Mabel"	Innes	2:46
6.	"Kama Sutra"	Innes, Stanshall	0:40

Side 2
No.	Title	Writer(s)	Length
7.	"Humanoid Boogie"	Innes	3:03
8.	"Trouser Press"	Spear	2:18
9.	"My Pink Half of the Drainpipe"	Stanshall	3:34
10.	"Rockaliser Baby"	Innes, Stanshall	3:32
11.	"Rhinocratic Oaths"	Innes, Stanshall	3:22
12.	"11 Moustachioed Daughters"	Stanshall	4:49

Bonus tracks on 2007 re-issue CD
No.	Title	Writer(s)	Length
13.	"Blue Suede Shoes" (previously unreleased)	Carl Perkins	1:38
14.	"Bang Bang" (previously unreleased)	Sonny Bono	2:40
15.	"Alley Oop" (Girls version)	Dallas Frazier	2:32
16.	"Canyons Of Your Mind" (Single version)	Vivian Stanshall	3:02
17.	"Mr. Apollo" (German version)	Neil Innes, Vivian Stanshall	4:10

== Personnel ==
- Vivian Stanshall - vocals, spoken word, trumpet, tuba, percussion, phonofiddle, euphonium, bagpipes, congas
- Neil Innes - vocals, piano, organ, harpsichord, Mellotron, accordion, guitars, dulcimer, vibraphone, congas
- Rodney Slater - saxophones, bass saxophone, trumpet, oboe, cornet, trombone
- Roger Ruskin Spear - saxophones, vocals on 'Trouser Press', guitar, trumpet, clarinet, cornet, xylophone, accordion, glockenspiel, tam-tam
- Larry Smith - drums, congas, tap dance, vocals
- Joel Druckman - bass guitar, spoken word and vocals on 'We Are Normal' and 'Trouser Press'
- Dave Clague - bass guitar (on unconfirmed tracks)

Technical

- Gerry Bron, Gus Dudgeon - producers
- Andy Johns, Terry Brown - engineers
- Vivian Stanshall - cover design, liner notes
- Anthony Bowes, David Stamford, Yves Debraine - cover photos
