= Bill Posters Will Be Band =

Comic musical group

Bill Posters Will Be Band was a comic musical group formed by musicians who were members of The Bonzo Dog Band and Bob Kerr's Whoopee Band. The band was formed late 1983 by Biff Harrison, Jim "Golden Boots" Chambers, Evil John Gieves Watson, Sam Spoons, Hugh Crozier and Dave Clennel.

They regularly performed at the jazz venue The Bull's Head at Barnes in South West London. The final line-up featured Chambers, Harrison, Watson, Spoons, Peter Shade and Megs Etherington. Occasionally "special guests" were allowed onstage, notably Roger Ruskin Spear and Rodney Slater, both from the Bonzo Dog Doo Dah Band.

Their final outing was on 28 December 2014.

Members of Bill Posters formed part of Bonzo Bills, who continued to play at The Bull's Head.
