= Unpeeled =

Unpeeled may refer to:

- Unpeeled (Bonzo Dog Band album), a compilation album by The Bonzo Dog Band
- Unpeeled (Cage the Elephant album), a studio album by Cage the Elephant
