= Narcissus (music) =

"Narcissus" is a piece of music composed for the piano in 1891 by Ethelbert Nevin. It is fourth of the five pieces in the suite Water Scenes. The composer recalled the Greek myth of Narcissus and, upon rereading the story, the music came quickly. The first draft was written immediately and was revised after a break for dinner. It was then sent for publication as the composer was so confident in the work that he did not play it until receiving the proofs. When published, it was a great success, selling over 125,000 copies of sheet music and has been a musical standard ever since.

It has a simple, sweet structure which flows easily and so is a standard piece used in piano teaching.

The piece was used for a light comical duet which was recorded by Sir Norman Wisdom and Joyce Grenfell in 1952. This is also known as The Laughing Song.

It also appears (with a short conversation following) as a track on Gorilla, the 1967 debut album of the Bonzo Dog Doo-Dah Band, and features in the queue for the Spirit of London dark ride at Madame Tussauds in London.
