= Rodney Slater (musician) =

Member of the Bonzo Dog Doo-Dah Band, playing saxophones and other musical instruments

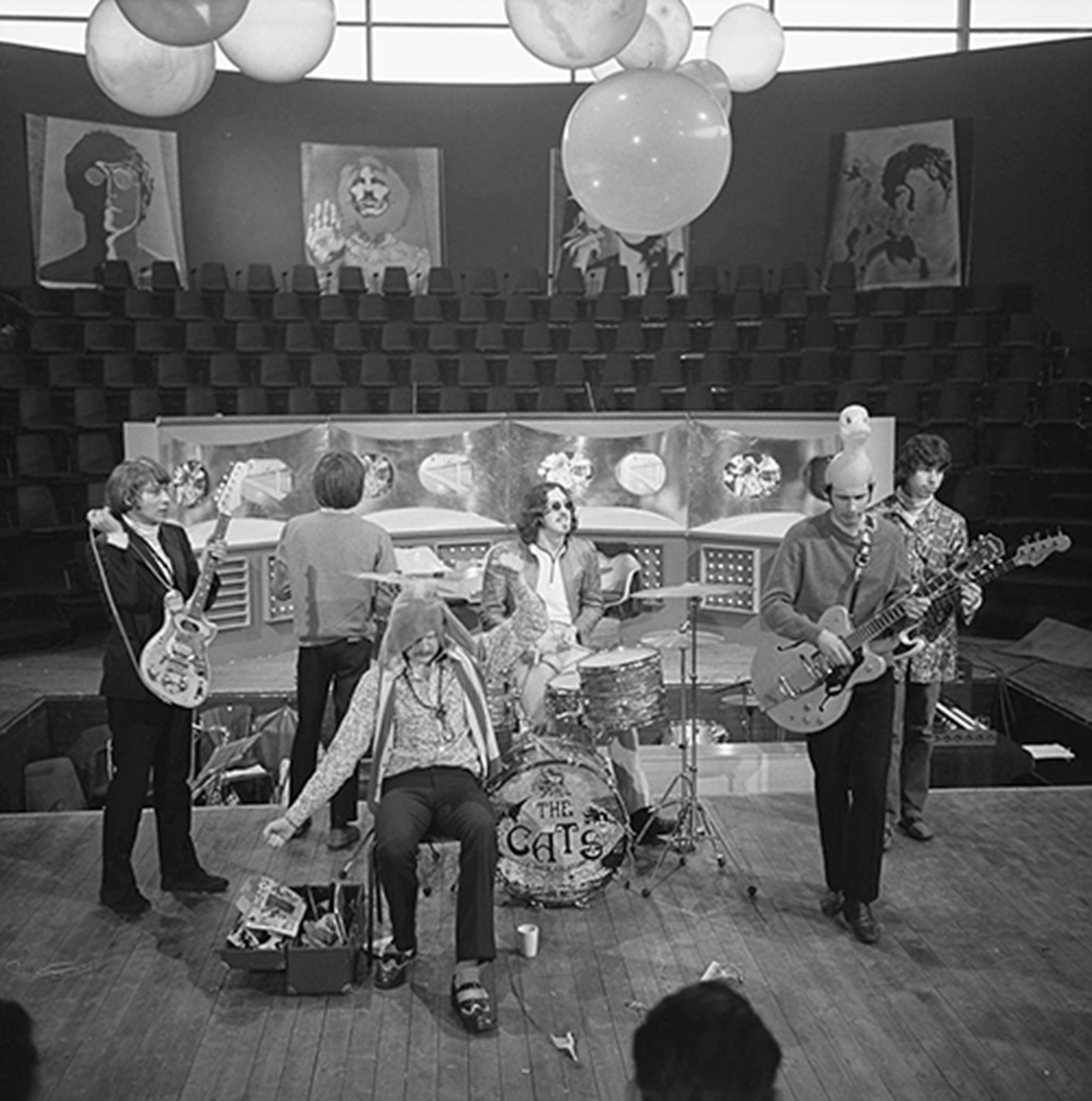
- Rodney Slater (left) with the Bonzo Dog Doo-Dah Band (1968)

Background information
- Born: 8 November 1941 (age 84); Crowland, England, U.K.
- Genres: Rock, pop
- Occupation: Musician
- Instruments: Saxophone, clarinet, trombone
- Years active: 1962-present
- Member of: Bonzo Dog Doo-Dah Band

Rodney Desborough Slater (born 8 November 1941 in Crowland, Lincolnshire) is a member of the Bonzo Dog Doo-Dah Band, playing saxophones and other musical instruments (particularly winds).

== Career ==
=== Bonzo Dog Doo-Dah Band ===
He was a founder member of the Bonzo Dog Doo-Dah Band. The band was officially formed on 25 September 1962, at Slater’s home at 164c Rosendale Road, West Dulwich, when Vivian Stanshall and Rodney met and quickly bonded, after being introduced by Slater's flatmate Tom Parkinson. At the time, Slater was already playing in a traditional jazz band at college with Parkinson on sousaphone, and Chris Jennings on trombone.

In the 2004 BBC Four documentary Vivian Stanshall: The Canyons of His Mind, Slater claims that the name was inspired by playing a Dadaist word game using cut-up technique, which involves writing words or phrases on paper, tearing the paper into strips and then randomly re-assembling the strips to form new phrases. One of the phrases created was "Bonzo Dog Dada Band": Bonzo Dog after Bonzo the dog, a popular British cartoon character created by artist George Studdy in the 1920s, and Dada after the early 20th-century art movement. Vivian would then say shortly after that he wanted to form a band with Slater with that name, although sometime after, “Dada” changed to “Doo-Dah”. The “Bonzo Dog Doo-Dah Band” was formed by Stanshall, Slater, and Chris Jennings, to name a few.

He was a core member of the band, and performed on their top five hit "I'm the Urban Spaceman" and on all subsequent recordings except 1972's Let's Make Up And Be Friendly. The Bonzo Dog Doo-Dah Band appeared in the Beatles' 1967 TV film Magical Mystery Tour and also in the ground-breaking ITV television series Do Not Adjust Your Set, which featured future Monty Python members Eric Idle, Terry Jones and Michael Palin. At the time, Slater owned a pet parrot, a pet that Vivian adored, so, Stanshall wrote the song Mr. Slater's Parrot, in 1970.

Slater appeared with the band when they reformed in 2006 performing with them at various shows over the next few years. He was also active in a side project “Three Bonzos and a Piano” with fellow Bonzos Roger Ruskin Spear and Sam Spoons as well as keyboard player Dave Glasson, Andy Roberts on guitar and occasionally 'Legs' Larry Smith.

=== Parrotopia! ===
In August 2017 Rodney Slater's Parrots released his debut album Parrotopia!, which contained music, dialogue and recitations. The album contains his first works as a writer.

== Discography ==
=== Bonzo Dog Doo-Dah Band ===
==== Albums ====
| Title | Year |
|---|---|
| Gorilla | 1967 |
| The Doughnut in Granny's Greenhouse | 1968 |
| Tadpoles | 1969 |
| Keynsham | 1969 |
| Pour l'Amour des Chiens | 2007 |

==== Singles ====
| A-Side | B-Side | Year |
|---|---|---|
| My Brother Makes the Noises for the Talkies | I'm Going to Bring a Watermelon to My Girl Tonight | 1966 |
| Alley Oop | Button Up Your Overcoat | 1966 |
| Equestrian Statue | The Intro and The Outro | 1967 |
| I'm the Urban Spaceman | The Canyons of Your Mind | 1968 |
| Mr. Apollo | Ready-Mades | 1969 |
| I Want to Be with You | We Were Wrong | 1969 |
| You Done My Brain In | Mr Slater's Parrot | |

=== Solo ===
| Title | Year |
|---|---|
| Parrotopia! | 2017 |
