= Tadpoles (album) =

Studio album by Bonzo Dog Band
- Released: 9 June 1969 (US); 1 August 1969 (UK)
- Studios: Trident Studios, London
- Genres: Comedy rock, psychedelic pop, trad jazz
- Length: 35:51
- Labels: Imperial (US); Liberty (UK)
- Producer: Gus Dudgeon

Bonzo Dog Band chronology
The Doughnut in Granny's Greenhouse (1968)	Tadpoles (1969)	Keynsham (1969)

I'm The Urban Spaceman
- Sunset SLS 50350 - British reissue

Tadpoles is the third album by the Bonzo Dog Band. It is largely a compilation of their work from the television show Do Not Adjust Your Set, on which they were the house band (although all the songs were specially re-recorded for the album). The US version of the album had a track list slightly different from that of the UK version: the US version removed "I'm the Urban Spaceman" and added "Readymades" the B-side of their follow-up single "Mr. Apollo".

The UK version was reissued on vinyl by Sunset Records in the early 1970s, re-titled I'm the Urban Spaceman.

In 2007 the album was reissued on CD with its original title and artwork, by EMI with five bonus tracks, only one of which ("Boo!") had actually been performed on 'Do Not Adjust Your Set' and was therefore the only genuine outtake from the album's original sessions.

== Sleeve notes ==
The original LP sleeve had seven holes cut out of the front cover, and multiple images printed on an insert card (or inner sleeve of the US version) helped listeners to visualize what band members were thinking by moving the card back and forth.

Pictured (left to right) on the front cover are Larry Smith, Vivian Stanshall, and Neil Innes. On the back cover are Dennis Cowan, Roger Ruskin Spear, and Rodney Slater.

Professional ratings
Review scores
Source	Rating
AllMusic	3/5 stars
Rolling Stone	(favorable)

== Track listing ==
No.	Title	Writer(s)	Length
1.	"Hunting Tigers Out in 'Indiah'"	Robert Hargreaves, Stanley Damerell, Tolchard Evans	3:06
2.	"Shirt"	Roger Ruskin Spear	4:27
3.	"Tubas in the Moonlight"	Spear	2:23
4.	"Dr. Jazz"	King Oliver, Walter Melrose	2:40
5.	"Monster Mash"	Bobby "Boris" Pickett, Leonard Capizzi	2:59
6.	"I'm the Urban Spaceman"	Neil Innes	2:24
7.	"Ali-Baba's Camel"	Noel Gay	3:31
8.	"Laughing Blues"	Bradley	3:44
9.	"By a Waterfall"	Irving Kahal, Sammy Fain	3:09
10.	"Mr. Apollo"	Innes, Vivian Stanshall	4:20
11.	"Canyons of Your Mind"	Stanshall	3:04

=== Bonus tracks on 2007 CD reissue ===
1. "Boo!" [Stanshall, Innes]
2. "Readymades" [Stanshall, Innes]
3. "Look At Me I'm Wonderful" [Stanshall]
4. "We Were Wrong" [Stanshall]
5. "The Craig Torso Christmas Show" (The Lady Is a Tramp/The Last Waltz/Calling All Workers) [Innes, Stanshall, Spear]

== Personnel ==
- Vivian Stanshall - vocals, recorder, tuba
- Neil Innes - guitar, piano, vocals
- Rodney Slater - saxophones
- Roger Ruskin Spear - saxophones
- Dennis Cowan - bass guitar
- Larry Smith - drums
