= The Best of The Bonzo Dog Band =

The Best of the Bonzo Dog Band

Greatest hits album by The Bonzo Dog Band
- Released: 1990
- Recorded: 1967–1971
- Genre: Comedy rock
- Length: 72:13
- Label: Rhino Records

The Best of the Bonzo Dog Band is a CD collecting the best cuts from albums of The Bonzo Dog Band. It was released in 1990 on Rhino Records.

== Track listing ==
1. "The Intro and the Outro" 3:05
2. "Bonzo Dog Band / Ali-Baba's Camel" 3:34
3. "Hello Mabel" 2:49
4. "Kama Sutra" 0:41
5. "Hunting Tigers Out In 'Indiah'" 3:07
6. "Shirt" 4:28
7. "I'm Bored" 3:07
8. "Rockaliser Baby" 3:29
9. "Rhinocratic Oaths" 3:23
10. "Tent" 3:12
11. "Beautiful Zelda" 2:27
12. "Can Blue Men Sing the Whites?" 2:50
13. "The Bride Stripped Bare By 'Bachelors'" 2:41
14. "Look At Me, I'm Wonderful" 1:50
15. "Canyons of Your Mind" 3:06
16. "Mr. Apollo" 4:21
17. "Trouser Press" 2:21
18. "Bonzo Dog Band / Ready-Mades" 3:11
19. "We Are Normal" 4:52
20. "I'm the Urban Spaceman" 2:25
21. "Trouser Freak" 2:53
22. "The Sound of Music" 1:23
23. "Suspicion" 3:30
24. "Big Shot" 3:28
