= The Peel Sessions (Bonzo Dog Band album) =

EP by The Bonzo Dog Band
- Released: 1990
- Recorded: 1969
- Genre: Comedy rock
- Length: 16:42
- Label: Strange Fruit Records

The Peel Sessions is an EP of music by The Bonzo Dog Band recorded in 1969. This is one of a series of original recordings made in the BBC studios for the John Peel shows on BBC Radio 1 known collectively as the Peel Sessions. It was released in 1990 on Strange Fruit Records under license from BBC Records and Tapes. Distributed by Dutch East India Trading.

== Track listing ==
1. "We're Going to Bring It On Home" 4:32.58
2. "Monster Mash" 3:17.25
3. "Sofa Head" 5:54.12
4. "Tent" 2:57.20
