= Ruskin Spear =

British painter (1911–1990)

Ruskin Spear CBE RA
- Born: Augustus John Ruskin Spear; 30 June 1911; Hammersmith, London, England
- Died: 16 January 1990 (aged 78); Hammersmith, London, England
- Education: Royal College of Art
- Known for: Painting, drawing
- Notable work: Citizen James (1962); Francis Bacon (1984)
- Children: Roger Ruskin Spear

Ruskin Spear, CBE, RA (30 June 1911 – 16 January 1990) was an English painter and teacher of art, regarded as one of the foremost British portrait painters of his day. He is the father of Bonzo Dog Doo-Dah Band member Roger Ruskin Spear.

== Biography ==
=== Early life and education ===
Born in Hammersmith to a working-class family, Spear was the youngest of five children. His father was a coach painter, while his mother worked as a cook. Spear contracted polio at the age of two, and later attended the local Brook Green (PD) School, a London County Council school for the "Physically Defective". Awarded an LCC scholarship to the Hammersmith School of Art, Spear followed on with studies at the Royal College of Art, where he later was made a Royal Academician and tutor in 1944, at the age of 33. Spear attended the local art school before going on to the Royal College of Art in 1930.

=== Teaching ===
He began his teaching career at Croydon School of Art, later teaching at the Royal College of Art from 1948 to 1975, where his students included Sandra Blow.

=== Art ===
Initially influenced by Walter Sickert, the Camden Town Group, and the portraiture of the Euston Road School, his work often has a narrative quality, with elements of humour and satire. As one of the thirty eight Official War Artists in Britain in the Second World War, between 1942 and 1944, Spear was commissioned by the War Artists' Advisory Committee, under the chairmanship of Kenneth Clark, given a short-term contract, producing several works for the scheme.

Because he used a wheelchair due to childhood polio, much of his work concerned his immediate surroundings. He rendered the citizens of Hammersmith relaxing in and around the local pubs, theatres and shops. In 1980, a retrospective of Spear's work was held at the Royal Academy in London.

Spear's paintings are held in important public collections in the United Kingdom, including the Tate Gallery Collection, Arts Council England, National Portrait Gallery, the Imperial War Museum, Government Art Collection and the Royal Academy of Arts, and worldwide.

=== Personal life ===
He was appointed a Commander of the Order of the British Empire (CBE) in 1979. Spear was the father of musician Roger Ruskin Spear (born 1943). Roger Ruskin Spear would find fame in the 1960s, as a member of the Satirical group The Bonzo Dog Doo-Dah Band.

=== Death ===
Spear died in Hammersmith on 16 January 1990, at the age of 78. The New York Times states he died following a short illness.
