= Larry Smith (musician) =

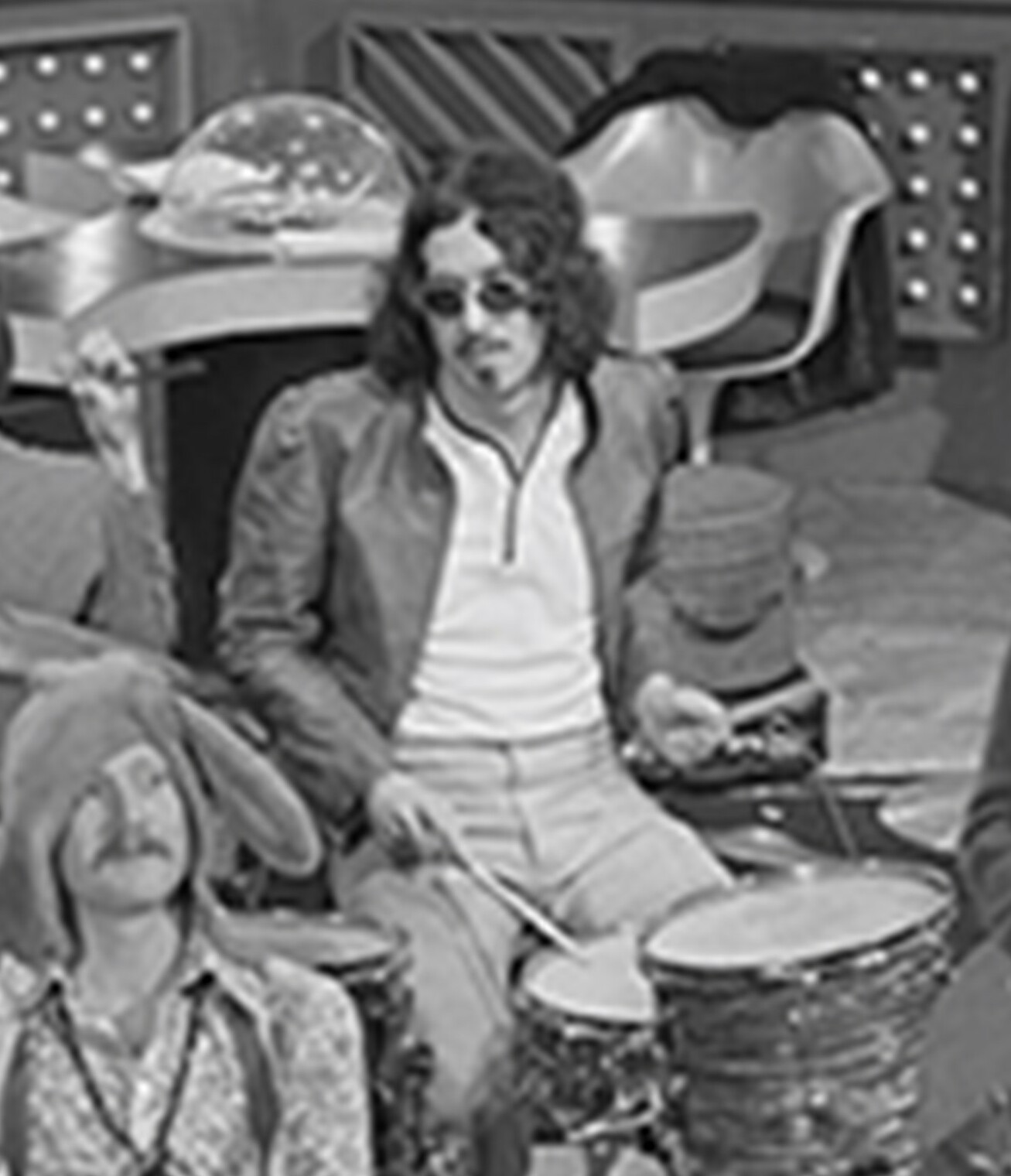
- Smith on drums with the Bonzo Dog Doo-Dah Band in 1968

Background information
- Born: Larry Smith; January 18, 1944 (age 82); Oxford, England
- Genres: Rock; pop
- Occupation: Musician
- Instruments: Drums; tap dancer; tuba
- Member of: Bonzo Dog Doo-Dah Band

Larry Smith, often known as "Legs" Larry Smith (born 18 January 1944), is an English drummer, known from the satirical comedy jazz (and later rock) group the Bonzo Dog Doo-Dah Band.

== Life and career ==
=== Early life and education ===
Smith was born in Oxford and grew up in Marston. He suffered from rheumatic fever and consequently missed school while he was convalescing. During this time, he began painting, and was encouraged by a teacher to enrol in the Oxford School of Art (now part of Oxford Brookes University) where he studied graphic design. Following this, he continued studying at the Central School of Arts and Crafts, where he met Vivian Stanshall. Whilst at art college, he would experience the beginning of his first of many persona portrayals:

I remember once dressing up as a rocker in leather gear, greasy hair and boots and storming into the Principal's office pretending to be my brother. 'Where's that Legs Larry, where is he? Where's my brother?' I yelled coarsely. The Principal kind of stiffened and said nervously, 'Oh, my goodness, you might find him either in Ladbroke's or the White Lion, I think'. It was wonderful....they had no idea it was me. Which was the beginning of me adopting various personae in the Bonzos.....like my Mr Wonderful who still features in current Bonzo shows.

=== Bonzo Dog Doo-Dah Band ===
Smith was originally invited to join the Bonzo Dog Doo-Dah Band by Viv Stanshall to be a tuba player and tap dancer. Following the release of their first LP, Gorilla, Smith also became the band's drummer.

As the drummer he became a core member of the band, and performed on their top five hit "I'm the Urban Spaceman" and on all subsequent recordings. The Bonzo Dog Doo-Dah Band appeared in the Beatles' 1967 TV film Magical Mystery Tour and also in the ground-breaking ITV television series Do Not Adjust Your Set, which featured future Monty Python members Eric Idle, Terry Jones and Michael Palin.

On 28 January 2006, with other surviving members of the Bonzo Dog Doo-Dah Band, Smith played a reunion concert at the London Astoria. A countrywide tour, which began in Ipswich and ended with two shows at the Shepherd's Bush Empire with Adrian Edmondson and Phill Jupitus, followed during November 2006. The Shepherd's Bush Empire shows were filmed for TV broadcast by the BBC and also released on DVD. A further (and sold-out) Bonzo Dog Doo-Dah Band concert at the London Astoria in June 2008 saw Smith perform with them; his 'Mr Wonderful' stage persona was a highlight of that concert.

=== Solo work ===
In 1969, Smith was the first member of the Bonzo Dog Band to release a record outside the group, albeit as part of another 'group'. Under the pseudonym 'Topo D. Bill', a one-off musical collective that included Keith Moon of The Who, Chris Squire and Tony Kaye from Yes and fellow Bonzo Roger Ruskin Spear, Smith released a non-comedic cover version of Jim Pepper's song "Witchi Tai To" as a single on the Charisma label. The less serious B-side – titled "Jam" – was an original Smith/Kaye composition; they collaborated again on the track "Rusty", written and recorded for the Bonzos' 1972 reunion/contractual obligation LP Let's Make Up And Be Friendly.

Following the dissolution of the original Bonzo Dog Band, Smith toured with Eric Clapton and Elton John and tap-danced in Elton John's song "I Think I'm Going To Kill Myself" from the album Honky Château (1972). He is also featured in the song "Legs Larry at Television Centre" on John Cale's 1972 album The Academy in Peril, for which he provides the voice of a television director.

In March 2009, Smug Records released "Legs" Larry Smith's – 'Call Me, Adolf!', a five-track digital EP produced by Gus Dudgeon.

Smith's first full-length solo album, Mr Wonderful, was released in 2023 by Right Recordings.

=== Work with George Harrison ===
Smith was a close friend of ex-Beatle George Harrison for many years, and designed the cover for his Gone Troppo album (1982). He also sang the theme song of, and appeared in, the Harrison-backed film Bullshot (1983), a HandMade Films production.

Harrison wrote and recorded a song about Smith called "His Name Is Legs (Ladies and Gentlemen)", released on his album Extra Texture (Read All About It) (1975).

=== Later works ===
Smith has designed album covers, exhibited paintings, appeared in award-winning commercials, and created stage-sets.

== Discography ==
=== Studio albums ===
==== Albums ====
Title	Year
Gorilla	1967
The Doughnut in Granny's Greenhouse	1968
Tadpoles	1969
Keynsham	1969
Let's Make Up and Be Friendly	1972
Pour l'Amour des Chiens	2007

==== Singles ====
A-Side	B-Side	Year
My Brother Makes the Noises for the Talkies	I'm Going to Bring a Watermelon to My Girl Tonight	1966
Alley Oop	Button Up Your Overcoat	1966
Equestrian Statue	The Intro and The Outro	1967
I'm the Urban Spaceman	The Canyons of Your Mind	1968
Mr. Apollo	Ready-Mades	1969
I Want to Be with You	We Were Wrong	1969
You Done My Brain In	Mr Slater's Parrot	1970
Slush	Music From Rawlinson End	1972
Slush	Slush	1972
Slush	King of Scurf	1972
No Matter Who You Vote For, The Government Always Gets In	No Matter Who You Vote For, The Government Always Gets In	1992
