= Bonzo Dog Doo-Dah Band =

British band led by Vivian Stanshall

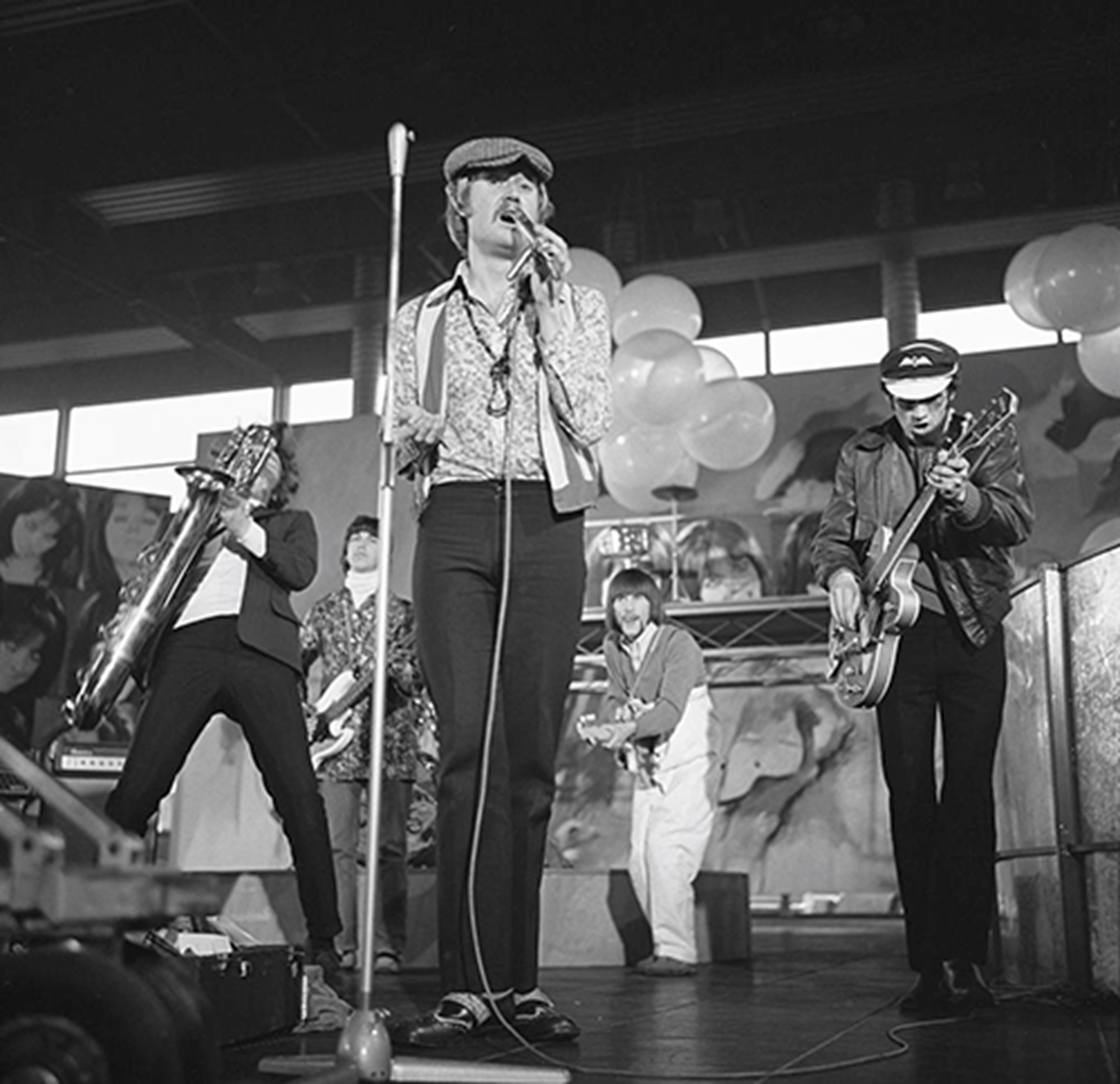
- The band appearing in June 1968 on Fenklup (Dutch television)

Background information
- Also known as: The Bonzo Dog Band; The Bonzos; The Bonzo Dog Dada Band
- Origin: London, England
- Genres: Comedy; satire; music hall; pop; rock; psychedelia; trad jazz; doo-wop
- Years active: 1962–1970; 1972; 1988; 2006–2019
- Labels: Parlophone; Liberty; Imperial; United Artists
- Spinoffs: The World; BiG GRunt; GRIMMS; Bob Kerr's Whoopee Band; Bill Posters Will Be Band; Three Bonzos and a Piano; Bonzo Bills
- Past members: Vivian Stanshall; Neil Innes; Martin "Sam Spoons" Ash; Vernon Dudley Bowhay-Nowell; Dave Clague; Joel Druckman; Dennis Cowan; Sidney Nicholls; Leon 'Lenny' Williams; Rodney "Rhino" Desborough Slater; Roger Ruskin Spear; "Legs" Larry Smith; Bob Kerr; see: § Band members.

The Bonzo Dog Doo-Dah Band (also known as the Bonzo Dog Band or the Bonzo Dog Dada Band or the Bonzos) was a comedic music band created by a group of British art-school students in the 1960s. Combining elements of music hall, trad jazz and psychedelia with surreal humour and avant-garde art, the Bonzos came to public attention through appearances in the Beatles' 1967 film Magical Mystery Tour and the 1968 ITV comedy show Do Not Adjust Your Set.

== History ==
=== Formation and early years (1962–1966) ===
The Bonzo Dog Doo-Dah Band was officially formed on 25 September 1962, at 162c Rosendale Road, West Dulwich, when Vivian Stanshall (lead vocals, tuba and other wind instruments) and fellow art student Rodney Slater (saxophone/clarinet) bonded over the late-night transatlantic broadcast of a boxing match between Floyd Patterson and Sonny Liston, after being introduced by Slater's flatmate Tom Parkinson. At the time, Slater was already playing in a traditional jazz band at college with Parkinson on sousaphone, and Chris Jennings on trombone. Trumpeter Roger ('Happy' Wally) Wilkes and banjo-player Trevor Brown were the founders of this loose conglomerate at the Royal College of Art, although the lineup is thought to have been exceptionally fluid and constantly revolving, consisting of as many as forty to fifty rotating members if Stanshall's later recollections are to be believed.

Stanshall joined the band in September 1962. He and Slater rechristened it The Bonzo Dog Dada Band. In the 2004 BBC Four documentary Vivian Stanshall: The Canyons of His Mind, Slater claims that the name was inspired by playing a Dadaist word game using cut-up technique, which involves writing words or phrases on paper, tearing the paper into strips and then randomly re-assembling the strips to form new phrases. One of the phrases created was "Bonzo Dog Dada Band": Bonzo Dog after Bonzo the dog, a popular British cartoon character created by artist George Studdy in the 1920s, and Dada after the early 20th-century art movement.

In the early 1960s comedic pop records by artists such as Charlie Drake, Bernard Cribbins and Spike Milligan were popular in the UK and enjoyed chart success alongside pop music parodies by pop cabaret acts such as the Barron Knights, and this fledgling version of the Bonzos was already slowly turning its style from more orthodox music towards the comedy-tinged 1920s popular jazz-style sound of groups such as the Alberts and the Temperance Seven.

This original lineup (centred on Stanshall, Slater, Wilkes, Brown, Parkinson, Jennings, saxophonist Claude Abbo and drummer Danny Hedge) soon imploded. Flatmates Stanshall, Slater and Parkinson had seriously overspent their Autumn Term's grant money on good food, clothing and musical instruments, and in December they were evicted for non-payment of rent and – thanks to Stanshall's failed attempt at making scrumpy in the bath – damage to the property.

Stanshall and Slater then parted ways. Slater dedicated himself to the resurrection of the band. In 1963 the two reunited with Wilkes. They added new band members: Goldsmiths College lecturer Vernon Dudley Bowhay-Nowell on banjo, double bass and later bass guitar; and Neil Innes, his lodger, songwriter/pianist and later guitarist. Bowhay-Nowell was already familiar with the band's earlier incarnation and happily came on board.

Innes proved pivotal to the band's continued existence and their later success. He had a musical education and a philosophical bent, and he marshaled the band's disparate talents into something resembling cohesion. Innes has spoken often about his first meeting with Slater and Stanshall in a London pub—Stanshall wore a Victorian frock coat, checked trousers, pince-nez glasses and large rubber false ears on his head whilst carrying a euphonium under his arm.

The band worked with trombonist John Parry and drummer Ed Chamberlain before Slater recruited Martin Ash, a percussionist who later took the stage name of Sam Spoons. Spoons secured the band their first regular pub gig at The Kensington in Notting Hill, where they were joined by banjo player "Big" Sid Nicholls. Nicholls in turn introduced Roger Ruskin Spear (son of the British artist Ruskin Spear) to the band. Spear was interested in sculpture and the manufacture of early electronic gadgets, objets d'art, and sound-making systems, and had played in a one-off scratch band with Slater and Innes. From his own defunct band The Jungle Orchestra, Spear brought with him trumpeter Leon "Lenny" Williams to replace the departing Wilkes.

Band members continued to come and go throughout 1963 and 1964 but by 1965 the band had settled to a stable lineup of Stanshall (lead vocal/mime), Slater (clarinet/saxophone), Innes (piano/guitar/vocals), Bowhay-Nowell (basses/banjo), Spoons (drums/percussion), Spear (saxophone/devices), Nicholls (banjo), Williams (trumpet), Parry (trombone) and Raymond Lewitt (tuba). The line-up changed again later that year with the departure of Parry (who later became a founding member of The Pasadena Roof Orchestra), and the final 'classic' Bonzos band member, "Legs" Larry Smith, joined to replace the outgoing Lewitt. Smith was a long-standing friend of Stanshall's, the two having been students together at Central College of Art. Stanshall had long had designs on somehow insinuating his erstwhile drinking companion—Smith was a notorious bon viveur—into the band despite his lack of any apparent musical talent, with a view to exposing the world to Larry's undoubted charisma. While Smith's musical input at this point was, by his own admission, limited, he still brought a keen sense of showmanship to the Bonzos; strongly influenced by the movie The Rise and Fall of Legs Diamond, Larry adopted the name 'Legs' and took up tap-dancing, a skill he developed to such an entertaining level that it earned him a solo 'tap-dance extravaganza' spot in the band's stage show.

By this point the band had turned semi-professional and were playing regular gigs at the Deuragon Arms in Homerton, East London and at the Tiger's Head in Catford, South London, where their performances soon gathered an enthusiastic following. It was around this time that the band were approached by budding show business impresario Reg Tracey, who offered to manage them and introduce them to the dubious but lucrative delights of Northern England's working men's club circuit. They proved popular on the club circuit and the lifestyle and steady income generated convinced the band members to turn fully professional. As a consequence they never stopped working and the clubs introduced them to all manner of 'unusual' characters who later populated their song catalogue.

Thanks to Tracey's contacts, the band made their TV debut in February 1966, performing "(Won't You Come Home) Bill Bailey" on the children's show Blue Peter, introduced by John Noakes. In spring, Bob Kerr replaced Leon Williams and shortly after this, Sid Nicholls left.

In April, Tracey secured them a record deal with Parlophone. Their first single, a cover of the 1920s song "My Brother Makes the Noises for the Talkies", was backed with "I'm Going To Bring A Watermelon to My Girl Tonight".

A second single, "Alley Oop" backed with "Button Up Your Overcoat" followed in October of that year. Neither single sold well, and this eventually spelled the end for their hapless manager Reg Tracey when the band came to the attention of rival manager Gerry Bron, whose contacts in the industry were more impressive and held more promise for the now driven and ambitious Stanshall, who had by this point assumed de facto leadership of the band. Tracey threatened legal action for breach of contract and the band had to be bought out of the agreement.

=== Move from jazz to rock (1967) ===
Although The Bonzos had started out playing and parodying trad jazz and 1920s-style popular music, by 1967 they were contemplating embracing a more contemporary style of rock music, in order to counter claims that they sounded too much like The Temperance Seven or the fictional, studio-concocted New Vaudeville Band. In fact although they were now exclusively managed by Gerry Bron, The Bonzos were invited to perform live as the New Vaudeville Band in order to capitalise on the fictional group's recent chart success with "Winchester Cathedral"—an offer The Bonzos immediately declined in favour of retaining their own artistic control. However, Bob Kerr happily agreed to help form a real New Vaudeville Band, allegedly taking the bulk of his former bandmates' stage act with him, a move which finally forced The Bonzos' hand over the change of direction (Kerr later went on to create his own long-standing early Bonzos/Vaudevilles-style band, Bob Kerr's Whoopee Band, which included other ex-Bonzos Sam Spoons and Vernon Bowhay-Nowell in its future line-ups). According to Neil Innes, The Bonzos had learned a salutary lesson about the pitfalls of show business:

Our trumpeter then was Bob Kerr, great player, and a fun guy. But he was friends with (songwriter and producer) Geoff Stephens, who'd made "Winchester Cathedral" with session men. And he knew Bob, so he rang Bob up saying: 'What am I going to do? "Winchester Cathedral"'s a hit, and I've got no band to promote it.' So Bob came, flushed with excitement, to the rest of us at our digs, saying, 'We can be The New Vaudeville Band!' and we said, 'Certainly not, no way!' So, Bob couldn't understand this, so we said, 'Well, go, you go and do it then, if you want to. Go, never darken our towels again!', kind of thing. But the next thing, on Top of the Pops, was the New Vaudeville Band, with the singer looking exactly like Viv, in a sort of lamé suit, all the musicians wearing the kind of suits we were wearing, with two-tone shoes. They'd even nicked the cutout comic speaking balloons, which we made out of hardboard, with a fret saw, and painted white, and then wrote, 'Wow, I'm really expressing myself!' to hold over somebody's head while they did a saxophone solo. There was the entire image, and for the next few weeks people were saying to us, 'Hey, you're like that New Vaudeville Band!' And that's when I think Legs Larry Smith said, "Well, look ...'—he'd always been arguing for doing some more modern material, so we all said, 'Right, now we start writing our own stuff.' "

The situation proved serendipitous, however, as they were able to capitalise on the burgeoning spirit of the times by combining their jazz stylings with increasingly fashionable psychedelic touches. As their popularity increased (especially among other musicians), they were asked by Paul McCartney to appear in the Beatles' Magical Mystery Tour film at the end of 1967, performing "Death Cab For Cutie".

Around this time they were also hired as the resident band on Do Not Adjust Your Set, an afternoon children's television comedy show notable for starring several future members of Monty Python (Eric Idle, Terry Jones and Michael Palin), Denise Coffey, and David Jason in the cast. The band performed every week as well as sometimes participating in sketches.

After signing with the US-based Liberty Records label, the Bonzos released their first album, Gorilla (1967), produced by Gerry Bron. The LP included "Jazz: Delicious Hot, Disgusting Cold" which parodied their early "trad" jazz roots and featured deliberately inept jazz playing. The record label had allowed them two hours of studio time per track, so "Jazz" was completed in a single take to allow more time for the far more complex "The Intro and the Outro". In this number every member of the band was introduced and played a solo, starting with the genuine band members before including such improbable guest musicians as John Wayne on xylophone, Adolf Hitler on vibes, J. Arthur Rank on gong, Prime Minister Harold Wilson on violin, the Wild Man of Borneo, Val Doonican, Horace Batchelor, and Lord Snooty and His Pals. The music was based on an excerpt from Duke Ellington's "C Jam Blues".

The first album was recorded on a four-track tape recorder, as was typical for 1967. Due to the limited number of tracks, most of the fictional non-band "guest stars" were simply faded in and out as required.

"Adolf Hitler on vibes" sample from "The Intro and the Outro"
10 second sample from the album "The History of the Bonzos"

By December 1967, bassist Vernon Dudley Bowhay-Nowell and drummer Sam Spoons had been summarily fired from the band. Vernon had spent much of the year ill and had missed numerous recording sessions as a result, while Sam Spoons' musical ability in the studio had now been judged unsatisfactory according to Stanshall's increasingly perfectionist criteria. For all that, however, it was "Legs" Larry Smith who now moved to occupy the drum stool, despite his limited playing experience. Meanwhile, session player Dave Clague, who had deputised for Vernon on various "Gorilla" recording sessions, was hired as replacement bassist.

=== "Urban Spaceman" and beyond (1968–1970) ===
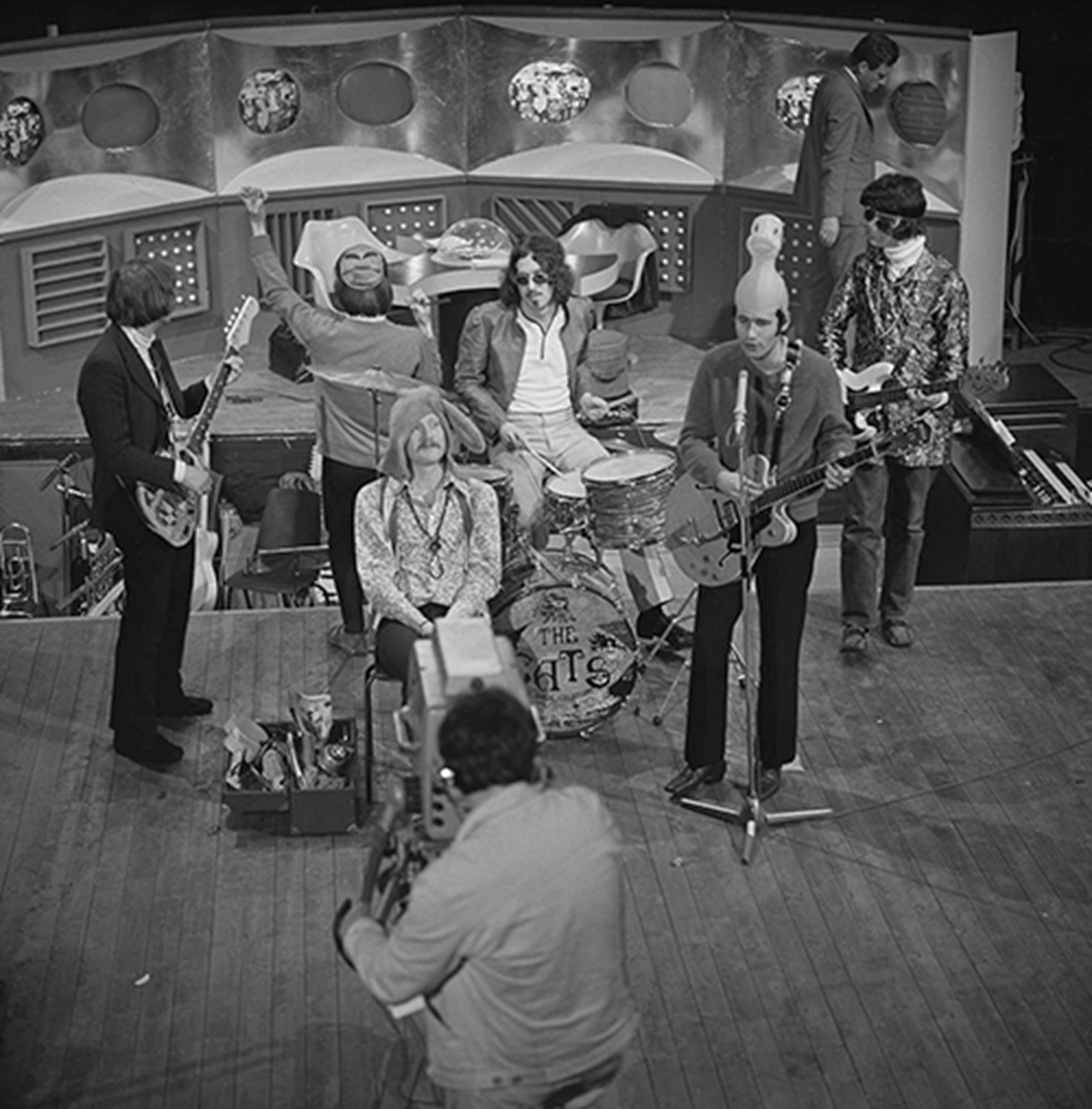
The Bonzos in the Netherlands (June 1968)

The Bonzos began to be featured more regularly on television and radio during 1968. The group also became a popular live attraction off the back of their ongoing tour schedule, continuing with the working men's clubs and now also taking in the nightclub and university circuits. All this hard work began to pay off when the group achieved a Top Five hit single in October with Neil Innes' "I'm the Urban Spaceman", produced by Paul McCartney and Gus Dudgeon under the collective pseudonym "Apollo C. Vermouth".

The same year, the Bonzos recorded their second album at Morgan Studios, with The Doughnut in Granny's Greenhouse (the title being a euphemism for an outside toilet), released that November, showcasing a marked change in musical direction from Gorilla. After an introductory series of straight-faced street interviews with bewildered pedestrians (conducted by current bassist Joel Druckman and featuring the public's reactions to Vivian Stanshall cavorting about wearing only his underpants, shoes and a papier-mache rabbit head) self-proclaimed 'breezy opener' "We Are Normal" soon launches itself towards a faintly terrifying Zappa-esque psychedelic crescendo. Elsewhere, "Can Blue Men Sing the Whites?" rather savagely teases some of the heavy-hitters of the then fashionable British Blues boom against a reasonably authentic Brit-blues musical backdrop of its own. Other songs such as "Postcard" and "My Pink Half of the Drainpipe" skewer parochial suburban British pastimes and attitudes, while the anarchic "Trouser Press"—featuring a 'solo' by Roger Ruskin Spear on a genuine trouser press he had had fitted with a pickup—later gave its name to the American anglophile rock magazine Trouser Press. 1920s-style croon-along "Hello Mabel" (complete with musical flock of sheep) is the only real reminder of The Bonzos' original musical style, while "Eleven Moustachioed Daughters", Stanshall's darkly tribal homage to Screamin' Jay Hawkins' "Feast of the Mau-Mau", closes the LP in an unexpectedly nightmarish manner.

By the end of 1968, The Bonzos wanted to be successful in the US. Their manager Gerry Bron, however, thought they should be consolidating their success in England before rushing off to conquer The States, and this difference of opinion led to a parting of the ways (although the two parties amicably retained their publishing and agency deals). The band had recently been courted by Tony Stratton Smith who was more sympathetic to their desire to crack America and promised to deliver what they wanted, and by Christmas he was their new manager.

The 1968–69 period is also known for its personnel changes within the band. Over a single 12-month period, the bass slot vacated by Vernon Dudley Bowhay-Nowell was filled by Dave Clague and then Joel Druckman (an American whose monotone drawl can be heard to humorous effect throughout the "Doughnut" album), before the band recruited the more temperamentally suitable and amenable Dennis Cowan early in 1969—just in time for the recording sessions for their next album. Clague was surprised at his dismissal and to find that he was only considered a 'hired' musician whilst he was playing with them, despite appearing on every episode of the first series of Do Not Adjust Your Set.

Throughout 1968 and 1969, The Bonzos also found time to record a large number of radio sessions for BBC Radio 1's Top Gear programme hosted by John Peel, where they took the opportunity to try out more experimental works such as the musical suite SofaHead and an extended concept piece co-written with Arthur Brown titled The Brain Opera (which aside from brief excerpts released in 1971 by Arthur Brown's Kingdom Come remained unrealised). These regular appearances on Peel's show kick-started Stanshall's long and fruitful association with Peel and BBC Radio, which continued until Stanshall's death in 1995.

As 1969 began, it seemed that American success was on the horizon for The Bonzos. In April Stratton Smith secured them the support slot on a high-profile tour of the U.S. with The Who, and some appearances at the Fillmore East with The Kinks as well as a string of club dates. Gerry Bron's misgivings were revealed to be well-founded, however, when Smith proved to be out of his depth, and The Bonzos' first American sojourn was so badly organised and promoted that the promised 'tour' ended up amounting to little more than the Fillmore appearances and a few scattered low-profile club dates, with much twiddling of thumbs in between. The Bonzos' act had been well received by the few audiences who witnessed it, but it was far from the triumphant adventure they had expected. Upon their return to the UK in May they parted company with Smith, and it was now that Stanshall made the ultimately disastrous decision to take on the day-to-day management of the band himself.

By this point, the band had also decided to drop the 'Doo-Dah' from their name and now became officially known as, simply, The Bonzo Dog Band. In June they released their new album Tadpoles. Most of the songs on this album had already been performed by the group on Do Not Adjust Your Set, and the album had originally been conceived as a kind of 'soundtrack album' for the recently ended TV show. As a result, much of the material was something of a throwback to the Gorilla era musically, even though most of the songs (with the exception of a few vintage tracks that dated as far back as the 1966 Parlophone sessions) had been re-recorded especially for the LP. Also included was a version of the band's latest single, the almost proto-metallic "Mr. Apollo". Despite the album's rag-bag nature and the fact the band themselves did not regard it as part of their discography proper, it ironically proved to be their best-selling original LP.

In August they appeared at the 1969 Isle of Wight Festival where tap-dancing drummer "Legs" Larry Smith was an onstage hit with his lubricious footwork, camp 'showbiz superstar' persona and rapport with the audience. This part of the act became so popular that guest drummers such as Keith Moon, Aynsley Dunbar or Jim Capaldi were often deputised to sit in for Smith during live performances.

It was at this point the stress of managing the group's affairs, while simultaneously writing half of their material and performing front of stage, began to take a serious toll on Stanshall's physical and mental health. Nevertheless, he and the others opted to embark upon a second American tour during September. Innes said that when the band picked him up at his house to drive to the airport, Stanshall answered the door with his head completely shaved, which gave him a startled, almost frightened look. True to bad form, the trip was cut short after Roger Ruskin Spear suffered a personal family tragedy and shockingly no-one from the UK office saw fit to inform him or the others about it until well after the event. An understandably enraged Spear immediately abandoned the tour and returned to the UK. Initially the band attempted to fulfill the remaining dates without him, but the tour really began to derail after a rancorous press interview where Stanshall and Innes complained about recent events and the general lack of support and promotion from their record company. Their candour only led to the band and Liberty Records becoming further alienated from each other. When Stanshall also began displaying signs of a complete nervous collapse under the strain of his duties as front man and manager, he and the band quickly decided to cut the tour short at great expense to their future ambitions. As a collective, they never returned to America.

It was a chastened Bonzo Dog Band who returned to the UK, and with Spear rejoining them they regrouped to complete work on their fourth album Keynsham. The titular Keynsham (pronounced CANE-sham) is a small town near Bristol in south-west England. According to Neil Innes, the name of the album derived from an oft-repeated advertisement played on Radio Luxembourg in the 1950s and early 1960s, which promoted a method of forecasting results for football matches (and using these results in football pools). In the advertisement, which was of great length, Horace Batchelor, inventor of 'the amazing Infra Draw method', would spell his postal address of K-E-Y-N-S-H-A-M for those listeners who wished to purchase his secret. Batchelor had earlier been name-checked (alongside "Zebra Kid") performing on percussion in "The Intro and the Outro".

As for the Keynsham album itself, it is an intense, surreal, but near-impenetrable conceptual piece that depicts the town of Keynsham as an enclosed psychiatric hospital, populated by anxious and disturbed characters in search of meaning or enlightenment. However this only becomes even slightly apparent to the listener once they have read Vivian Stanshall's original liner notes (which unfortunately are usually omitted from reissues of the album), although there are a few clues to the theme in the short linking passages between songs. Despite the vagueness of the concept, Keynsham remains for the most part a strong musical collection. Innes' songwriting in particular had developed in subtlety and maturity, to a point that equalled many 'serious' artists of the era. Stanshall's songs, such as "Tent", while still overtly humorous had now taken on a much darker aspect, or, as with "Sport (The Odd Boy)" a new and urgent poignancy. Even "Mr Slater's Parrot", Stanshall's sole concession to The Bonzos sound of old, had an unsettlingly manic edge to it.

Although the band considered Keynsham their creative zenith, unfortunately their artistic satisfaction did not translate into healthy record sales on its release in November. This perceived lack of success, exacerbated by Stanshall's continuing problems and the rapidly deteriorating relationship with Liberty Records, effectively destroyed the group's morale for good.

Disheartened and at a creative impasse, the core members elected to go their separate ways while they were still on good terms (with the notable exception of founder member Rodney Slater, who claims not to have even known the band were breaking up until Stanshall announced it on stage). In January 1970 they summoned the collective will to go out on a high by embarking on a lengthy farewell tour of the UK. As popular as ever in a live setting and with the creative pressure finally off them, the tour went surprisingly well and The Bonzos played their final gig at Loughborough University in March.

=== First reunion (1972) ===
While the group formally disbanded in 1970, their record company compelled them to reunite in late 1971 to fulfil a contractual obligation and record a final album. Titled Let's Make Up and Be Friendly, the album was released in 1972. The edition of the Bonzo Dog Band that made the Friendly LP featured only Stanshall, Innes and bassist Dennis Cowan from the "classic" earlier line-ups, although Roger Ruskin Spear appears on one track, and "Legs" Larry Smith on two. Rodney Slater is also listed as appearing "in spirit" in the album's credits.

The band also made live appearances in the UK in 1974, appearing (at least) at Rutherford College, part of the University of Kent, and Goodricke College, part of the University of York.

=== Second reunion (1988) ===
Various members of The Bonzos (including Stanshall and Innes) reconvened in 1988 to record a new single, "No Matter Who You Vote For the Government Always Gets In (Heigh Ho)". The recording was meant to tie in with a then-current British election, but was not released at the time; instead, the single came out just prior to the next British general election in 1992. It was also Stanshall's final recording with the band; he died in a house fire in 1995.

One of the Bonzos' song titles, "Cool Britannia", was revived as a media label for the culture of the United Kingdom throughout most of the 1990s, inspired by 1960s pop culture and associated with the Labour government of Tony Blair.

=== Third reunion (2006–2008) ===
On 28 January 2006 most of the surviving members of the band played a concert at the London Astoria, to celebrate the band's official 40th anniversary. Neil Innes, "Legs" Larry Smith, Roger Ruskin Spear, Rodney Slater, Bob Kerr, Sam Spoons and Vernon Dudley Bowhay-Nowell appeared. There were also a number of special guests attempting with various degrees of success to be Vivian Stanshall, one of two members of the band not still living (the other being bass player Dennis Cowan). The various Stanshall impersonators included Stephen Fry, Ade Edmondson, Phill Jupitus and Paul Merton (who needed to read the words to "Monster Mash" from cue cards at the show). The classic Bonzo stage antics were in evidence, including performances on the Theremin Leg and Trouser Press. The show was filmed and was broadcast on BBC Four and also released on DVD in May 2006.

A countrywide tour, with Ade Edmondson and Phill Jupitus, followed during November 2006, starting in Ipswich and ending with two nights at the Shepherd's Bush Empire, where Paul Merton and Bill Bailey joined in for a handful of songs. David Catlin-Birch (lead guitar and vocals) joined the band for the tour; Catlin-Birch has also been a member of World Party and The Bootleg Beatles.

Officially calling themselves The Bonzo Dog Doo-Dah Band again, the group released a live double CD of the Astoria concert titled Wrestle Poodles... And Win! on 13 November 2006.

On 10 December 2007, the band released their first new studio album in 35 years, a 28-track album titled Pour l'Amour des Chiens.

The reunited line-up were due to perform again in 'The Bonzo Dog Doo-Dah Band Christmas Show' on Friday 21 December and Saturday 22 December 2007 at the Shepherd's Bush Empire in London, but the shows were postponed without explanation. The shows were later played in 2008.

An ultimatum with Innes around this time forced his hand and he stepped down as band leader, leaving the rest of the Bonzos 'in charge'.

=== Recent events (2008–2019) ===
Whilst Vernon allied with Bob Kerr to play as 'Bonzomania', Roger, Rodney and Sam remained together and joined up with pianist David Glasson (ex Whoopee Band) and performed as Three Bonzos and a Piano. Since October 2008, they have undertaken regular gigs. They have included appearances from "Legs" Larry Smith and Vernon Dudley Bowhay-Nowell. Three Bonzos and a Piano launched a new CD Hair of the Dog at the Bloomsbury Theatre, London on 6 February 2010, featuring new numbers from all band members and some re-workings of older favourites. Larry and Vernon were at the Bloomsbury gig. In 2012 they released another CD, Bum Notes.

Innes toured the United States in 2009 and 2010, having performed a number of shows in 2009 in the UK. He subsequently played with the Idiot Bastard Band, along with Phill Jupitus, Adrian Edmondson, and Raw Sex drummer Rowland Rivron. They played a mixture of original comedy songs and covers, including some Bonzos numbers.

In 2009, Angry Penguin Ltd published the first history of the band, Jollity Farm, written by Bob Carruthers and edited by David Christie, with comprehensive interviews with all the core members of the group. The first release also included a limited edition DVD featuring the band's 2007 reunion performance at the Shepherd's Bush Empire, which included several performances from that show which had not been previously released.

A configuration under the name 'Almost the Bonzo Dog Doo Dah Band' performed from 2012, more regularly featuring Legs and the now 82-year-old Vernon. This grouping played their final gig together as a five-piece, alongside Andy Roberts, Dave Glasson and the eleven-piece Keynsham Town Band in Milton Keynes. The following week, Sam Spoons' "Bill Posters Will Be Band" played their last, and the week after, "Bob Kerr's Whoopee Band" (with Vernon guesting) also disbanded. Spoons died on 27 September 2018 following a long illness.

In 2019 the members of the band became embroiled in a legal battle with "Anglo Atlantic Media Limited" which had trademarked their name, two years previously, without their permission. One of the directors of Anglo Atlantic Media Limited is their former promoter Bob Carruthers. The trademark had made it impossible to perform or record under the band name. In November, 2019, the case was eventually decided in the band's favour, although with the demise of Sam Spoons and also Neil Innes a month after the decision, the surviving band members have not performed under that name again.

== Band members ==
=== Pre-1966 ===
The first lineup of the Bonzo Dog Doo Dah Band consisted of members of the unnamed jazz band formed, firstly, by members of the St. Martin's College Jazz Band in September 1959 and then added to by members of the Royal College of Art Jazz Band in October 1961. Initial members of the Bonzo Dog Doo Dah Band:

- Rodney "Rhino" Desborough Slater – clarinet from September 1959 (St. Martin's College Jazz Band)
- Tom Parkinson – sousaphone from September 1959 (St. Martin's College Jazz Band)
- Chris Jennings – trombone from September 1959 (St. Martin's College Jazz Band)
- Roger "Happy Wally" Wilkes – trumpet from October 1961 (Royal College of Art Jazz Band)
- Trevor Brown – banjo from October 1961 (Royal College of Art Jazz Band)

Once Vivian Stanshall was added as vocalist in September 1962, two other members joined the band:

- Ian Cunningham – saxophone
- Danny Hedge – drums

Cunningham was replaced by Claude Abbo in early December, and at the end of 1962, the band split, with only Stanshall, Slater and Wilkes remaining. Other members during the band's formative years included Leon "Lenny" Williams, John Parry, Raymond Lewitt and Sydney "Big Sid" Nicholls.

=== 1966–1970 ===
The following were members of the group from their first single "My Brother Makes The Noises for the Talkies" in 1966 to their break-up in 1970:

- Vivian Stanshall – trumpet, tuba, euphonium, lead vocals
- Neil Innes – piano, guitar, keyboards, vocals
- Rodney Slater – saxophones
- Roger Ruskin Spear – tenor saxophone, xylophone and various contraptions
- "Legs" Larry Smith – drums, tuba
- Martin "Sam Spoons" Ash – percussion (left in late 1967)
- Vernon Dudley Bowhay-Nowell – bass, banjo (left in late 1967)
- Bob Kerr – trumpet (left in late 1966)
- Dave Clague – bass (late 1967 to early 1968)
- Joel Druckman – bass (early to mid 1968)
- Dennis Cowan – bass (joined in mid 1968)

Stanshall and Innes were the band's principal songwriters, with occasional contributions from Spear and Smith.

=== Session/guest musicians ===
The band often used guest musicians on stage and in the recording studio. Additional musicians over the years included: "Borneo" Fred Munt, Chalky Chalkey, Aynsley Dunbar, Jim Capaldi, Anthony 'Bubs' White, Andy Roberts, Dave Richards, Dick Parry, Hughie Flint, Tony Kaye, and Glen Colson. Keith Moon, who became great friends with both Stanshall and Smith, played drums for part of The Bonzos' set at the 1969 Plumpton Festival (The Who were headlining that night). Moon also played drums for the majority of the Bonzos set at Bristol Locarno, using one drumstick and a brick. He was on a West Country tour with his valet, Dougal Butler who describes it in his book Full Moon.

=== Post-1972 ===
After the band's demise, both Innes and Stanshall became founding members of Grimms along with the members of The Scaffold and The Liverpool Scene.

Dennis Cowan died aged 28 on 3 June 1975. Vivian Stanshall died aged 51 on 5 March 1995. Martin Ash, alias Sam Spoons, died aged 76 on 27 September 2018. Neil Innes died aged 75 on 29 December 2019. Vernon Dudley Bowhay-Nowell died aged 91 on 1 November 2023.

=== Gallery ===
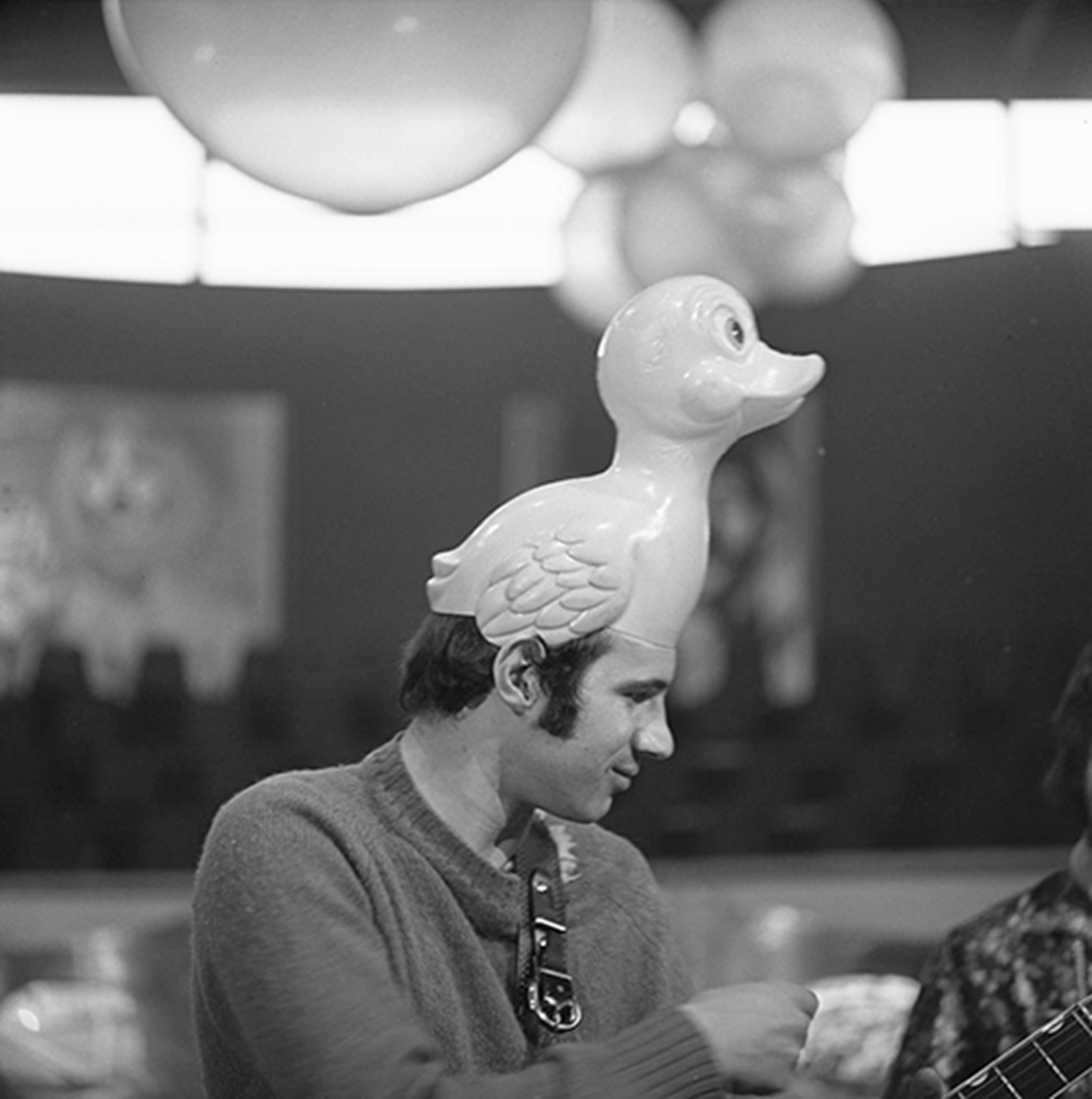
Neil Innes on the Dutch TV show Fenklup, 1968

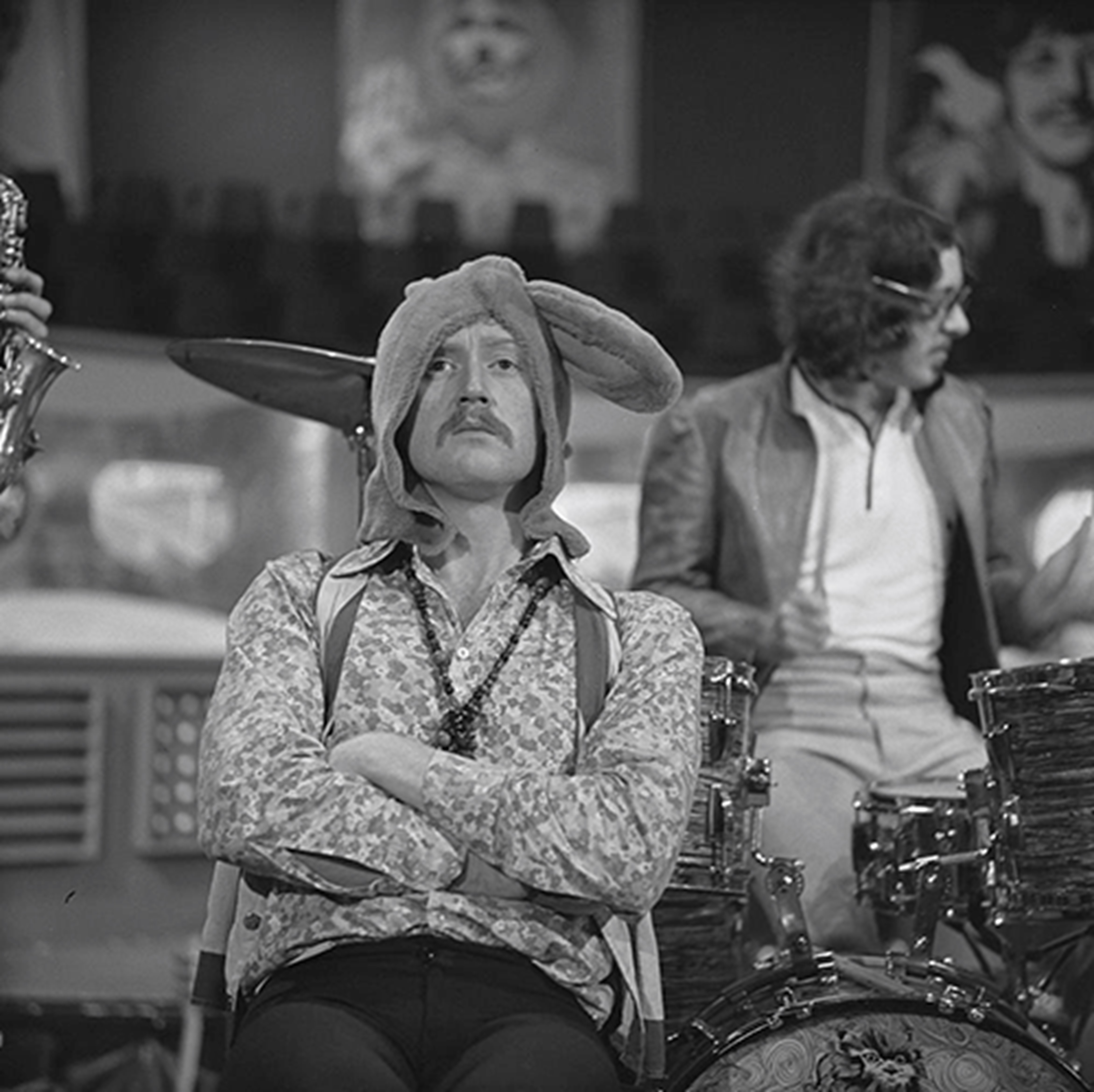
Vivian Stanshall and "Legs" Larry Smith (Fenklup, 1968)

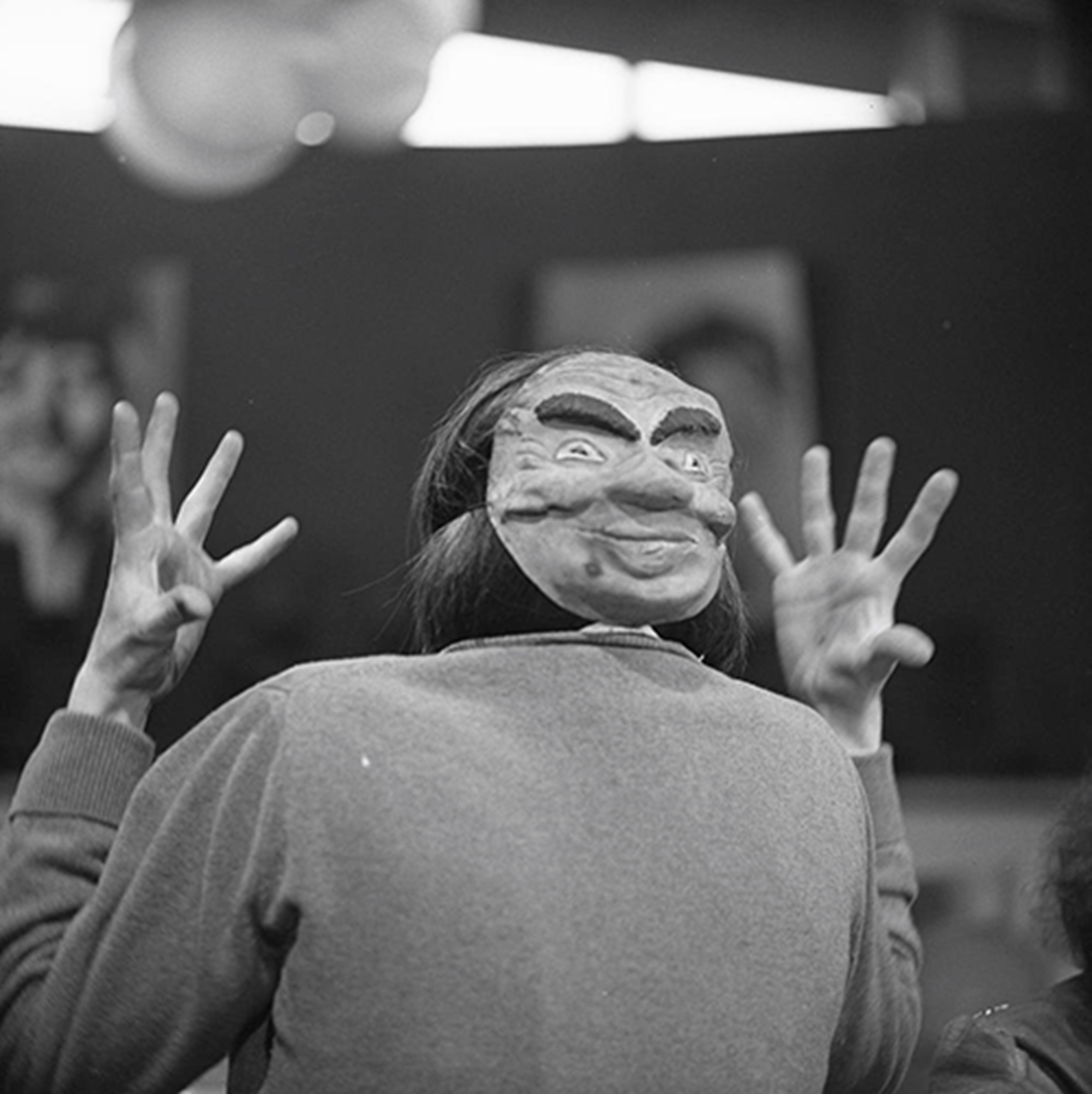
Roger Ruskin Spear (Fenklup, 1968)

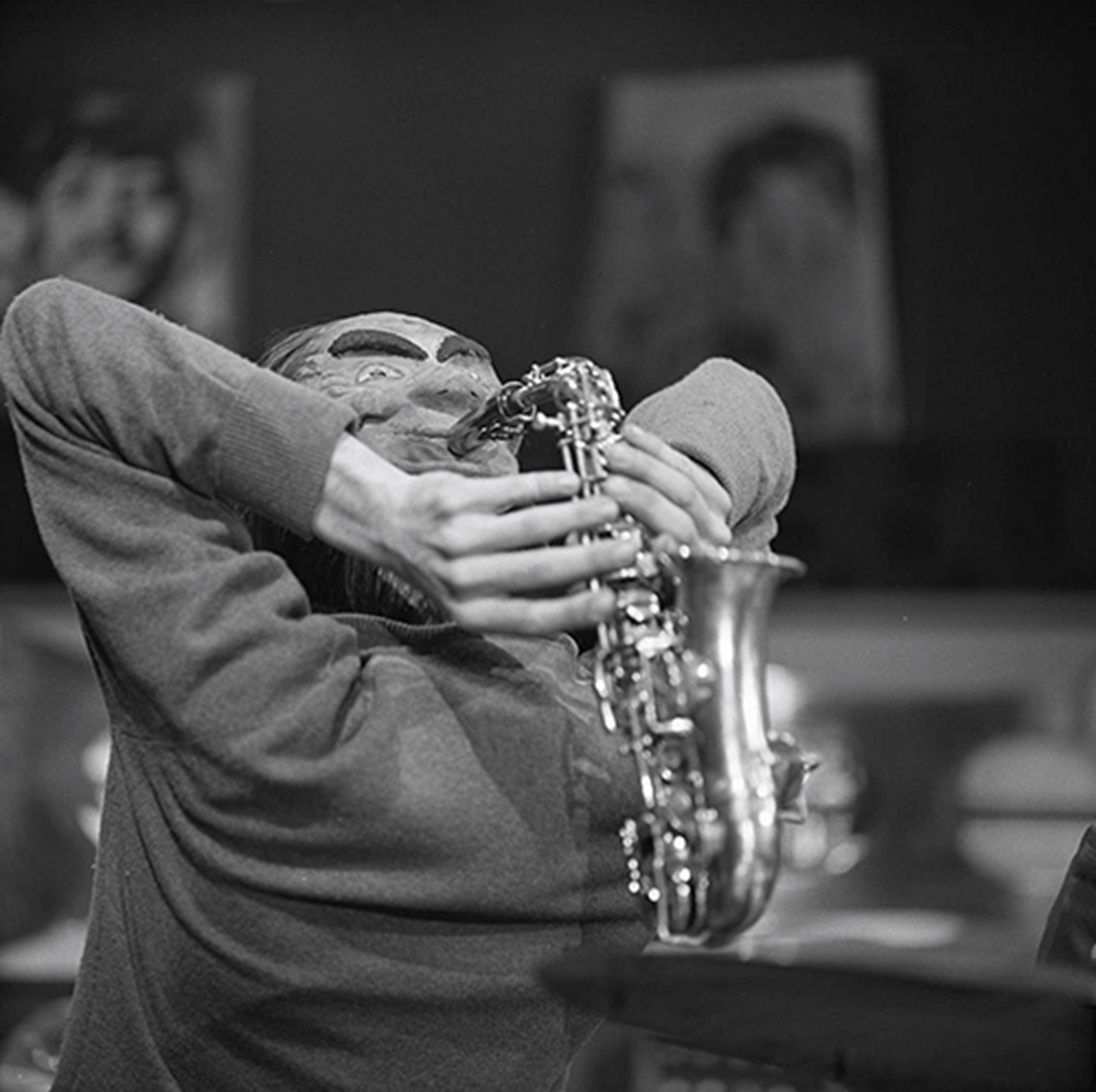
Roger Ruskin Spear (Fenklup, 1968)

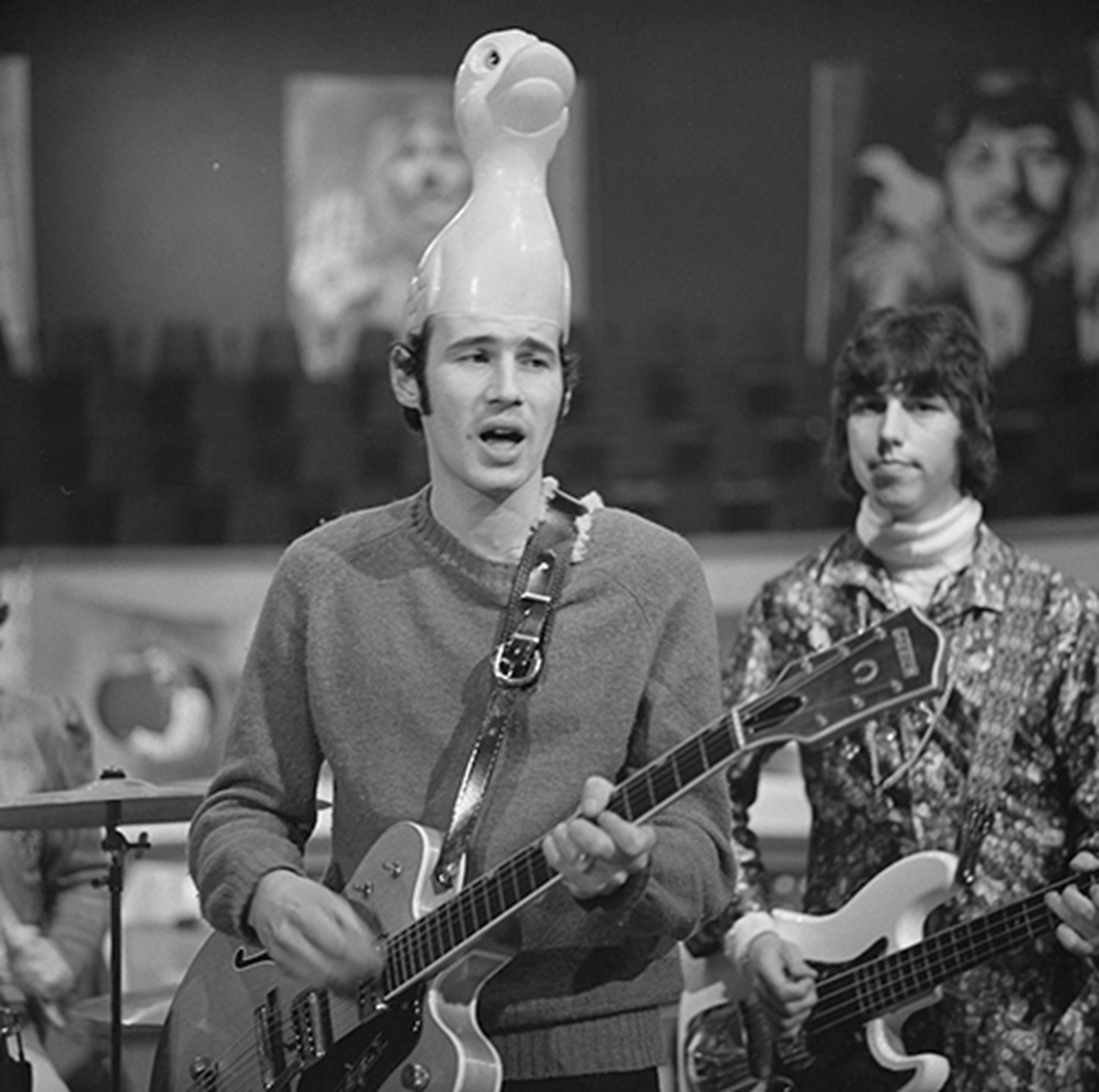
Neil Innes and not identified bassist (Fenklup, 1968)

== Tributes ==
Indie-rock band Death Cab for Cutie took their name from the song performed by the Bonzos in Magical Mystery Tour. The psychedelic rock band Poisoned Electrick Head took their name from a phrase coined in the Bonzo's song, "My Pink Half of the Drainpipe". Also, cult 1990s UK Indie band Sofa Head took their name from the Bonzo's song of the same name (which itself did not receive an official release until 1987).

== Television and film ==
The Bonzos appeared weekly on the Associated-Rediffusion later Thames Television show Do Not Adjust Your Set. Recordings of most of their performances still exist, with the first series having been released on DVD. As well as famous songs, the last episode of that series featured the still unreleased track "Metaphorically Speaking". Two songs from the band's set on BBC 2's Colour Me Pop have been repeated on television regularly, with a third, "Mr. Apollo", shot by a fan at home with a 8mm cine camera pointed at the screen. The Bonzos were also featured on various other TV shows during their heyday, including New Faces in 1966 (not to be confused with the 1970s ITV talent show of the same name), Blue Peter and German TV's Beat-Club (on which they performed Little Sir Echo and Canyons in Your Mind in the 31 December 1968, Episode No. 38). More recently, the last ever TV appearance by the original band, performing "Noises for the Leg" in December 1969 on the BBC, has recently surfaced and can viewed on YouTube.

As well as their appearance in the Beatles' film Magical Mystery Tour, the band made a short "silent" film The Adventures of the Son of Exploding Sausage in 1969 with a soundtrack of only music. The film culminates with a live performance of "We Are Normal" on a farm. An early feature, in an Autumn 1967 Pathé Newsreel, has the band miming to "The Equestrian Statue" and "Music for the Head Ballet", shot in London's Speakeasy. Short newsreel footage of their appearances at both the 1969 Plumpton and Isle of Wight festivals also exist.

== Discography ==
=== Studio albums ===
- 1967 Gorilla (as The Bonzo Dog Doo-Dah Band)
- 1968 The Doughnut in Granny's Greenhouse (chart No. 40) (as The Bonzo Dog Band and released as Urban Spaceman in the US)
- 1969 Tadpoles (chart No. 36) (as Bonzo Dog Band)
- 1969 Keynsham (as Bonzo Dog Band)
- 1972 Let's Make Up and Be Friendly (as Bonzo Dog Band)
- 2007 Pour l'Amour des Chiens (as The Bonzo Dog Doo-Dah Band)

=== Singles ===
- 1966 "My Brother Makes the Noises for the Talkies" / "I'm Going to Bring a Watermelon to My Girl Tonight" (Parlophone R5430)
- 1966 "Alley Oop" / "Button Up Your Overcoat" (Parlophone R5499)
- 1967 "Equestrian Statue" / "The Intro and The Outro" (Liberty LBF 15040)
- 1968 "I'm the Urban Spaceman" / "Canyons of Your Mind" (UK Singles Chart: No. 5) (Liberty LBF 15144)
- 1969 "Mr. Apollo" / "Ready-Mades" (Liberty LBF 15201)
- 1969 "I Want to Be with You" / "We Were Wrong" (Liberty LBF 15273)
- 1970 "You Done My Brain In" / "Mr Slater's Parrot" (Liberty LBF 15314)
- 1972 "Slush" / "Music From Rawlinson End" (United Artists UP 35358) (single credited to Neil Innes) (withdrawn from release)
- 1972 "Slush" / "Slush" (U.S.) (United Artists UP 50943) (promotional version)
- 1972 "Slush" / "King of Scurf" (U.S.) (United Artists UP 50943)
- 1992 "No Matter Who You Vote For, The Government Always Gets In (Heigh Ho)" CD EP Single (China Records WOK 2021)

=== Compilations and miscellaneous ===
- 1970 The Best of the Bonzos
- 1971 The Alberts, The Bonzo Dog Doo Dah Band, The Temperance Seven
- 1971 Beast of the Bonzos
- 1974 The History of the Bonzos
- 1983 Some of the Best of the Bonzo Dog Band
- 1984 The Very Best of the Bonzo Dog Doo-Dah Band
- 1990 The Bestiality of the Bonzos
- 1990 The Best of the Bonzo Dog Band
- 1990 The Peel Sessions (4-track extended play 12" & CD single)
- 1992 Cornology (3-CD set)
- 1995 Unpeeled
- 1999 Anthropology: The Beast Within
- 2000 New Tricks
- 2002 The Complete BBC Recordings (revised re-release of Unpeeled)
- 2006 Wrestle Poodles... And Win! (live reunion album)
- 2007 Expanded EMI CD remasters of all five original studio LPs, including rare and unreleased bonus tracks)
- 2010 Songs the Bonzo Dog Band Taught Us: A Prehistory of the Bonzos ('20s & '30s novelty songs later covered by The Bonzos)
- 2011 A Dog's Life (3-CD set – revised re-release of Cornology using the 2007 remasters)
- 2013 Two Original Classic Albums (budget re-release of Gorilla and Doughnut remasters)
- 2014 Original Album Series (first five albums in mini LP sleeves)
- 2017 The End of the Show: Lost Treasures 1967–2016 (4-CD box set of live and studio rarities)
- 2024 Still Barking - A comprehensive 20-disc (17 CDs & 3 DVDs) box set encompassing the period 1966-1972, including the five original band albums, singles, outtakes, rarities and live material, plus surviving radio and TV appearances.

== Videography ==
- 1967 Do Not Adjust Your Set (9 episodes released 2005, Bonzo Dog Band performs a song in each)
- 1967 Magical Mystery Tour (Bonzo Dog Band performs "Death Cab For Cutie")
- 2005 Inside The Bonzo Dog Doo Dah Band: A Critical Review (2 DVDs + 50-page book by Chris Welch)
- 2006 The Bonzo Dog Doo-Dah Band 40th Anniversary Celebration (London Astoria Theatre, 28 January 2006)
- 2007 Pour l'Amour des Chiens (disc 2, DVD—excerpts from above concert)

== See also ==
- Literary nonsense
- The Liverpool Scene
- The Alberts
- The Rutles
- Spike Jones
