= Bob Kerr's Whoopee Band =

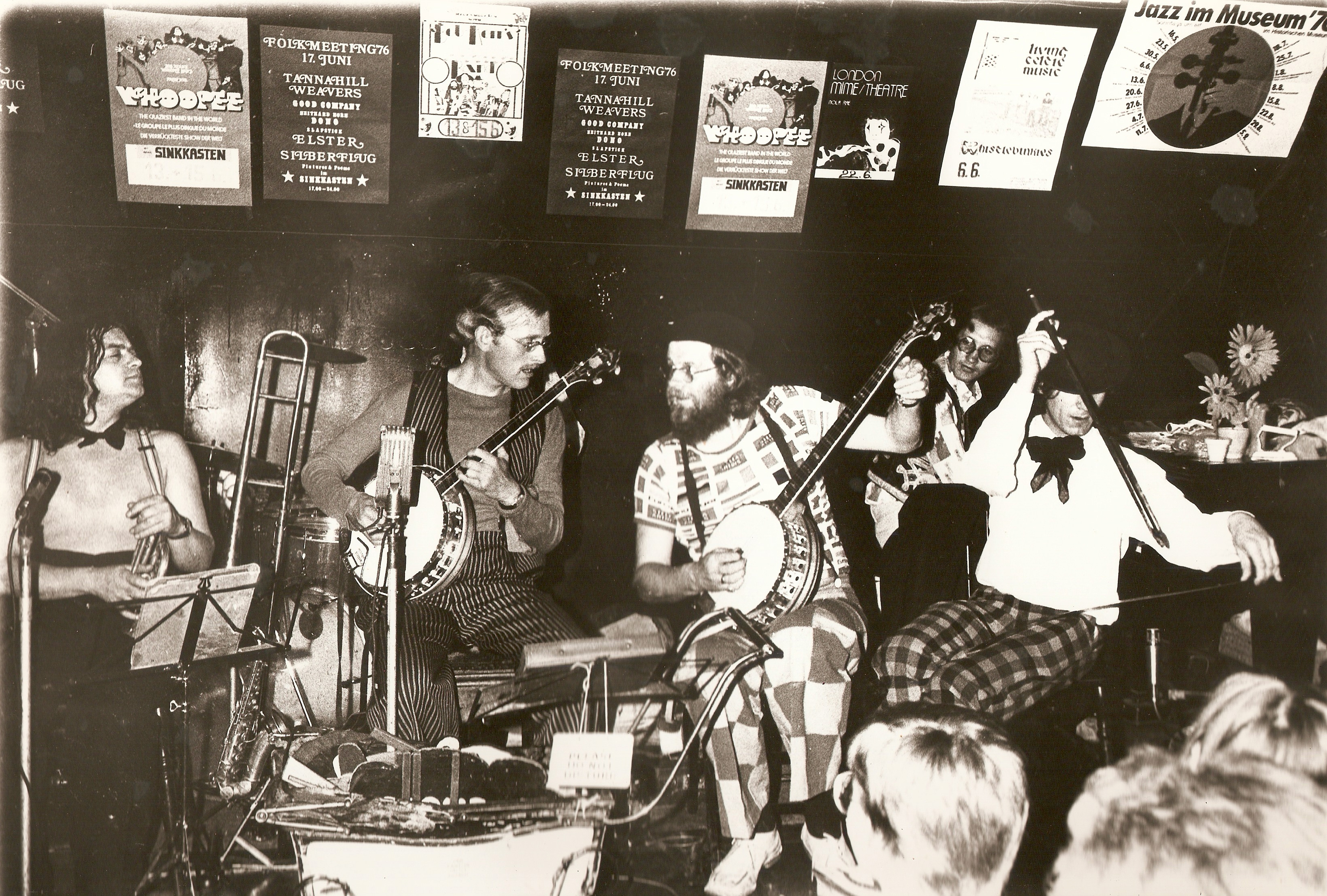
Bob Kerr's Whoopee Band in Germany (1976)

Bob Kerr's Whoopee Band, also billed as Bob Kerr and His Whoopee Band, is a jazz band which started in 1967 and continues to perform today. It was an offshoot of the eclectic Bonzo Dog Doo-Dah Band, and shared many similarities with other outfits of the time such as The New Vaudeville Band and The Temperance Seven. Founder Bob Kerr had been a member of both the Bonzos and the New Vaudeville Band.

== Membership ==
Started in 1967, by 1971, for the album Making Whoopee, the band's membership consisted of Bob Kerr, Vernon Dudley Bowhay Nowell, Sam Spoons, James Chambers, John "Evil Gieves" Watson, Biff Harrison, Franklin Tomes and David Glasson. Kerr, Nowell and Spoons had all been members of the Bonzo Dog Band.

In 1976, for the album The Whoopee Band, the membership consisted of Evil John Gieves Watson (banjo), Vernon Dudley Bowhay Nowell (tenor banjo), Biff Harrison, David Glasson (piano), Jim "Golden Boots" Chambers, and Bob Kerr.

For an August 1977 gig, the membership consisted of Bob Kerr (trumpet, trombone), Vernon Dudley Bowhay-Nowell (banjo), "Gentleman Frankie" Tooms (sousaphone), Sam Spoons (drums), "Evil John" Gieves Watson (banjo), Biff Harrison (clarinet, saxophone), Jim "Golden Boots" Chambers (saxophone), and David "Mr. Piano" Glasson (piano).

In 1978, for the Hard Pressed album, the membership consisted of Bob Kerr (cornet), Jim "Golden Boots" Chambers (alto sax), Vernon Dudley Bowhay Nowell (tenor banjo), "Evil" John Gieves Watson, Biff Harrison, David Glasson (piano), Sam Spoons (drums) and Frank Tooms.

In 1981, for the Things That Go Bump in the Mike album, the membership consisted of Bob Kerr, Jim Chambers, Vernon Dudley Bowhay Nowell, Biff Harrison, Sam Spoons, Hugh Crozier (piano) and Frank Tooms.

Two years later, the band split with Biff Harrison, Sam Spoons, Jim Chambers and John Gieves Watson moving off to the Bill Posters Will Be Band. This band continued with Megs Etherington and another former Whoopee member, Peter Shade.

By the time of a 1987 performance in Germany, the Whoopee Band consisted of Bob Kerr - tuba, Vernon Dudley Bowhay-Nowell - banjo, Richard White - clarinet, Hugh Crozier - piano, Frank Tomes - sousaphone and Colin Bowden - drums

Members of Bob Kerr's Whoopee Band are Bob Kerr, John "The Professor" Percival, Malcolm Sked, Bert Lamb and Henri Harrison.

== Former members ==
Former members of the band have included:

- Vernon Dudley Bowhay-Nowell
- Ian Howarth
- Frankie Tomes
- Sam Spoons
- Hugh Crozier
- Evil John Gieves Watson
- Biff Harrison
- Jim "Golden Boots" Chambers
- David "Mr Piano" Glasson
- Sean Moyses
- Dangerous Dave Keech
- Spike Botterill
- Mad Henry Davis
- Clive Fenton
- Tim Phillips
- Fred Ward
- Sir Alan Buckley
- Phil Buckley
- Richard White
- Dave Turner
- Roscoe (The Binman) Birchmore
- Graham Collicott
- Mike Hobbs
- Mike Kemp
