= Martin Ash =

British percussionist and art lecturer (1942–2018)

Martin Ash (8 February 1942 – 27 September 2018) was a British performer, percussionist, artist and art lecturer better known to many by his stage name Sam Spoons, the percussionist of Bonzo Dog Doo-Dah Band.

== Early life and education ==
He was born on 8 February 1942 in Bridgwater but moved to Barnstaple when he was 12. He was the first student to gain an A-Level in art at Barnstaple Grammar School, before moving to Plymouth to study illustration (NDD Honours). From 1963 to 1966 he studied industrial design at the Royal College of Art.

== Career ==
=== Musician ===
He joined The Bonzo Dog Doo Dah Band in early 1964, leaving in December 1967, and rejoining in 2006. Ash was also a member of Bob Kerr's Whoopee Band recording with the band on their eponymous LP.

Credited as Sam Spoons, Ash appeared on all the early Bonzo Dog Doo Dah Band singles and debut album Gorilla (1967). He was co writer and arranger of "Jazz, Delicious Hot, Disgusting Cold", which formed part of the Guest House Paradiso (1999) film soundtrack.

In 2006, Ash and other surviving members of The Bonzo Dog Doo Dah Band reunited - along with Stephen Fry, Ade Edmondson and Phill Jupitus - for a reunion tour.

=== Artist and lecturer ===
He worked as a senior art lecturer at Chelsea School of Art from 1972 until retirement.

A posthumous solo art exhibition, which Ash had been working on, was presented by White Moose gallery at Tapeley Park in Instow, from 14 October to 16 October 2018, titled KerbArt : A Solo Exhibition by Martin Ash (AKA Sam Spoons).

== Death ==
Ash died on 27 September 2018, aged 76, from cancer. His funeral was held at North Devon Crematorium in Barnstaple.
