= Roger Ruskin Spear =

English artist and musician (born 1943)

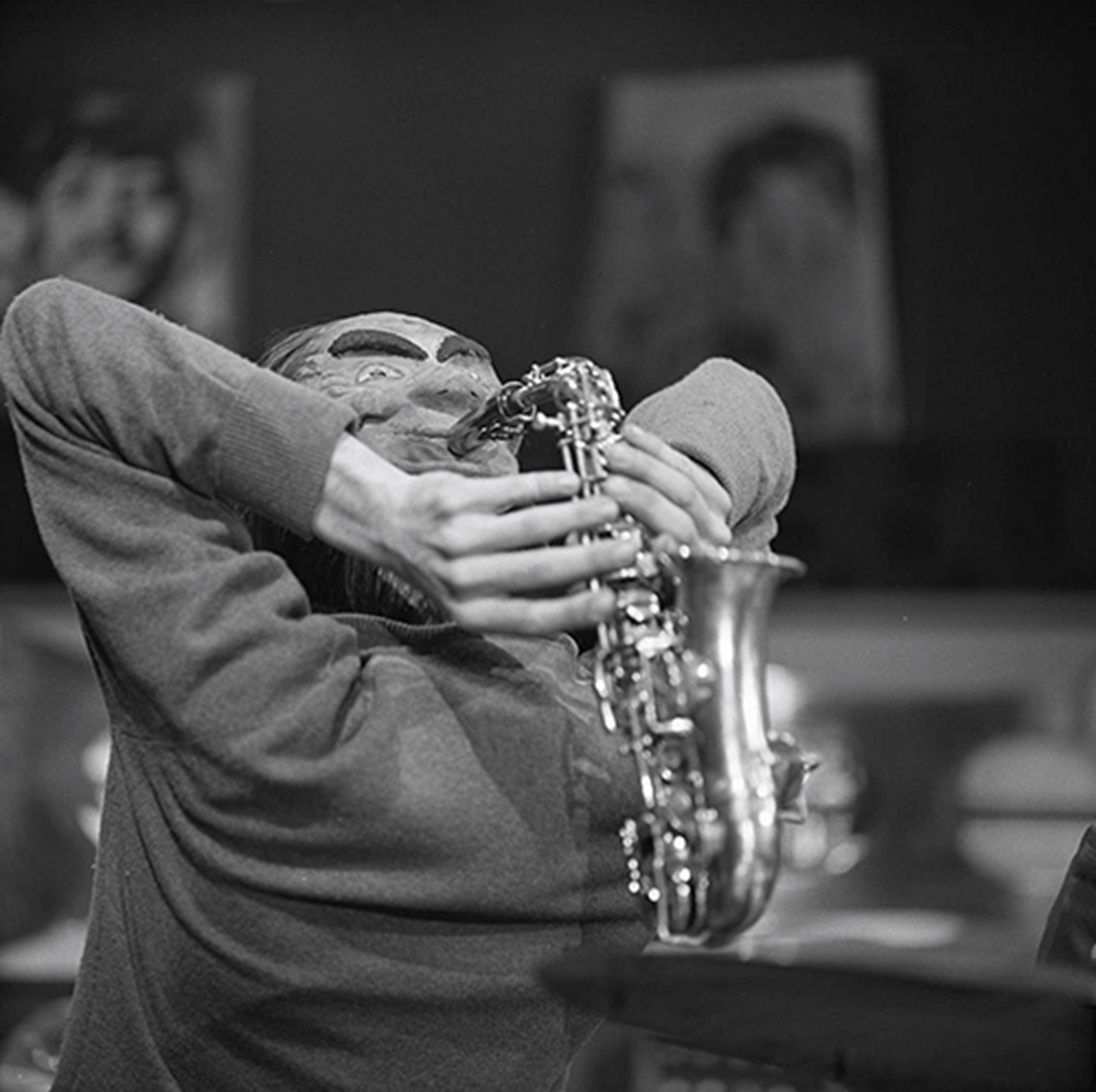
- Spear in the Bonzo Dog Doo-Dah Band in 1968.
- Born: 29 July 1943 (age 83); Hammersmith, London, England
- Education: Ealing Technical College and School of Art
- Father: Ruskin Spear
- Musical career
- Genres: Rock, pop
- Occupation: Musician
- Instruments: Saxophone, clarinet, trumpet, piano, guitar
- Member of: Bonzo Dog Doo-Dah Band

Roger Ruskin Spear (born 29 June 1943) is an English sculptor, multimedia artist and multi-instrumentalist who was a member of the Bonzo Dog Doo-Dah Band.

== Early life ==
Spear was born in Hammersmith, London, as the son of the satirical artist and lecturer Ruskin Spear (1911–1990). He grew up in Chiswick before attending Ealing Technical College and School of Art.

== Career ==
=== Bonzo Dog Doo-Dah Band ===
After Spear dissolved his jazz band New Jungle Orchestra at the end of 1964, he joined the Bonzo Dog Doo-Dah Band. He wrote such songs as "Shirt", "Tubas in the Moonlight" and "Trouser Press". He is known for his robot creations and the theremin part in "Noises for the Leg", amongst other tunes.

=== Later works ===
After the Bonzos parted company, Spear was a member of the short-lived band biGGrunt, with Vivian Stanshall. He also toured with his solo show "Roger Ruskin Spear and his Giant Kinetic Wardrobe" (a.k.a. "Giant Orchestral Wardrobe"). In 1979 Spear formed Tatty Ollity with Dave Glasson (a former member of Bob Kerr's Whoopee Band), Sam Spoons and Dave Knight. The band released a single, "Punktuation", on Rough Trade. In 1982 Spear took part in The Cut Price Comedy Show, a weekly confection of corny sketches and ironic end-of-the-pier jokes. Produced by ITV region TSW and screened on the then-new Channel 4, it ran for ten programmes and was then dropped.

In 1985 Spear and Dave Glasson formed the Slightly Dangerous Brothers, producing a single, "Let's Talk Basic", with a video featuring some of Spear's robot creations. In 1991 Spear played saxophone in Vivian Stanshall's show Rawlinson Dog Ends at the Bloomsbury Theatre, London. Spear had also played on Stanshall's album Teddy Boys Don't Knit (1981 Charisma CAS 1153).

Spear appeared on albums such as Go Man Gorman (1977), a solo outing for John Gorman of the Scaffold. He was also a member and co-founder of Bill Posters Will Be Band.

Until 2014, Spear performed regularly with Three Bonzos and a Piano, which is made up of Rod Slater and Sam Spoons, both former members of the Bonzo Dog Band, together with Dave Glasson on piano and, often, Andy Roberts – formerly of the Liverpool Scene and the Scaffold – on guitar.

Spear later played with an amalgamation of Bill Posters and Bonzo musicians called BonzoBills, involving Sam Spoons, Biff Harrison, Dave Glasson, Megs Etherington, Chris Lowe and Jim Heath (a former member of Harry Strutter's Hot Rhythm Orchestra).

In addition to his musical activities, Spear taught 3D design part-time at the Chelsea College of Art. One of his students was Mick Jones, later the co-founder and lead guitarist of punk rock band the Clash.

== Discography ==
=== Bonzo Dog Doo-Dah Band ===
==== Albums ====
Title	Year
Gorilla	1967
The Doughnut in Granny's Greenhouse	1968
Tadpoles	1969
Keynsham	1969
Let's Make Up and Be Friendly	1972
Pour l'Amour des Chiens	2007

==== Singles ====
A-Side	B-Side	Year
My Brother Makes the Noises for the Talkies	I'm Going to Bring a Watermelon to My Girl Tonight	1966
Alley Oop	Button Up Your Overcoat	1966
Equestrian Statue	The Intro and The Outro	1967
I'm the Urban Spaceman	The Canyons of Your Mind	1968
Mr. Apollo	Ready-Mades	1969
I Want to Be with You	We Were Wrong	1969
You Done My Brain In	Mr Slater's Parrot	1970
Slush	Music From Rawlinson End	1972
Slush	Slush	1972
Slush	King of Scurf	1972
No Matter Who You Vote For, The Government Always Gets In	No Matter Who You Vote For, The Government Always Gets In	1992

=== Solo ===
Title	Release type	Year
Rebel Trouser	Extended play	1971
Electric Shocks	Long Play	1972
Unusual	Long Play	1974
Electric Shocks Plus	Compact Disc	2002
