= I'm the Urban Spaceman =

Single by Bonzo Dog Doo-Dah Band

from the album Tadpoles
- B-side: "The Canyons of Your Mind" (Stanshall)
- Released: 11 October 1968 (UK); 18 December 1968 (US)
- Recorded: March 1968
- Studio: Chappell Recording Studios, London
- Genre: Comedy rock, psychedelic pop
- Length: 2:23
- Label: Liberty Records (UK); Imperial Records (US)
- Songwriter: Neil Innes
- Producer: Apollo C. Vermouth (alias of Paul McCartney)

Bonzo Dog Doo-Dah Band singles chronology
"Equestrian Statue" (1967)	"I'm the Urban Spaceman" (1968)	"Mr. Apollo" (1969)

Official audio
- "I'm the Urban Spaceman" at Beat-Club on YouTube

"I'm the Urban Spaceman" is a song released as a single in October 1968 by British band the Bonzo Dog Doo-Dah Band. It was their most successful single, reaching number 5 in the UK singles charts. It was written by Neil Innes, who won an Ivor Novello Award for it in 1968, and produced by Paul McCartney under the pseudonym "Apollo C. Vermouth".

The B-side, "The Canyons of Your Mind", was written by the Bonzo's frontman Vivian Stanshall.

== Composition and recording ==
According to Neil Innes who wrote the song, "urban spaceman" refers to the "urban spaces" (brownfield sites for redevelopment) in postwar Manchester. He intended the song to be a satire on the vacuous consumerism of 1960s advertising, and 'Urban Spaceman' the ideal figure in advertising who "doesn't exist in real life". The tune itself was inspired by the siren of a passing ambulance. Innes said:

I know this sounds all very pretentious, but the point was that I was, in my pompous little way, trying to sort of say, "Well, here's urban space. What about an urban spaceman? What would he be? He'd be the product of the advertising world, a glossy magazine or an advert on the tube. And an ambulance went by and went "nananananana" and so I thought, "Well, there's a tune."

The song was recorded at Chappell Recording Studios in Mayfair, London, and produced by Paul McCartney. Vivian Stanshall, who was out one night with Paul McCartney, complained about the strictness of their producer/manager Gerry Bron, and McCartney responded with an offer to produce "Urban Spaceman" for them. McCartney played the ukelele on the song, and the recording session lasted 8 hours. To end the song, Stanshall attached a trumpet mouthpiece and a funnel to a garden hose which he blew and whirled above his head to create the tune. McCartney, however did not mix the song; the band had spent most of the budget recording the song, the engineer Gus Dudgeon then took the multitrack to Decca Studios and secretly mixed the song while the Moody Blues were having a break during their recording session.

== Performance ==
A well-known staging of the song involves Innes performing solo while a female tap dancer performs an enthusiastic but apparently under-rehearsed routine around him. This skit originally appeared in a 1975 edition of Rutland Weekend Television, with Lyn Ashley as the dancer, and was revived in the 1982 film Monty Python Live at the Hollywood Bowl with Carol Cleveland taking over the role. Their association with members of Monty Python started on Do Not Adjust Your Set written by future members of the Python, and they performed on the show.

== Charts ==
Chart (1975)	Peak position
Australia (AMR)	12
Austria (Ö3 Austria Top 40)	19
South Africa (Springbok)	13
UK Singles (Official Charts)	5
West Germany (GfK)	39
