= Split album =

Music album which includes tracks by two or more separate artists

A split album (or split) is a music album that includes tracks by two or more separate artists. Split albums differ from "various artists" compilation albums in that they generally include several tracks of each artist, or few artists with one or two tracks each, instead of multiple artists with only one or two tracks each. There are also singles and EPs of the same variety, which are often called "split singles" and "split EPs" respectively.

== History ==
Split albums were initially done on vinyl records, with music from one artist on one side of the record and music from a second artist on the opposite side. As vinyl albums declined as a mass medium, CD issues followed the practice of combining music from two artists. Since the early 1980s, the format has been used widely by independent record labels, and artists in punk rock, emo, hardcore, grindcore, black metal, noise and indie rock circles. Splits usually receive an underground fanbase even if the artists featured are mainstream, as the success of split albums is most often not of a mainstream proportion.

== Examples ==
- Ella Fitzgerald and Billie Holiday at Newport by Ella Fitzgerald and Billie Holiday, was recorded live at the 1957 Newport Jazz Festival, and released in 1958
- 12 Songs of Christmas is a 1964 album of Christmas music by Frank Sinatra, Bing Crosby, and Fred Waring's Pennsylvanians
- Historic Performances Recorded at the Monterey International Pop Festival by the Jimi Hendrix Experience and Otis Redding is a live album recorded at the Monterey Pop Festival in June 1967
- The Alberts, The Bonzo Dog Doo Dah Band, The Temperance Seven by The Alberts, Bonzo Dog Doo-Dah Band and The Temperance Seven was released in 1971
- King Tubby Meets Vivian Jackson by reggae artist Yabby You and dub master King Tubby was released in 1976
- Xanadu (soundtrack) by Olivia Newton-John and Electric Light Orchestra (ELO), and is the soundtrack to the 1980 musical, Xanadu
- Faith / Void Split by Hardcore punk groups Void and the Faith was released on Dischord Records in 1982
- As I Lay Dying / American Tragedy by metalcore bands As I Lay Dying and American Tragedy was released in 2002
- Speakerboxxx/The Love Below by Big Boi and Andre 3000 of Outkast, released in 2003
- Leviathan / Xasthur by U.S. black metal artists Leviathan and Xasthur was released by Profound Lore Records in 2004
- Bowling for Soup Presents: One Big Happy! by pop punk bands Bowling for Soup, The Dollyrots, and Patent Pending, was released in September 2012, in support of the three bands' UK tour of the same name.
- West Coast vs. Wessex by U.S. punk rock band NOFX and the British folk punk artist Frank Turner was released in 2020
- Pompeii // Utility by rappers Earl Sweatshirt and Mike, and production team Surf Gang, released in 2026
