= John R. T. Davies =

English audio engineer and musician (1927–2004)

John Ross Twiston Davies (20 March 1927 – 25 May 2004) was an English audio engineer, who specialised in restoring classic jazz records. He was also a working musician and a member of The Temperance Seven.

Davies was born in Wivelsfield, Sussex, England, the son of a dermatologist. He was a trombonist, trumpeter and alto saxophonist. In the early 1950s, he was a member of the Crane River Jazz Band led by Ken Colyer which spearheaded interest in the original New Orleans jazz style. Later he achieved chart success with the 1960s jazz revival band The Temperance Seven. The group's recording of "You're Driving Me Crazy" reached the top of the UK Singles Chart in 1961. One of his eccentricities, captured in old photographs, was to wear a fez.

For many he was considered "the world's leading specialist in the art of sound restoration", specifically in regard to jazz and blues existing on pre-magnetic tape media such as shellac 78s. He was particularly interested in recordings from 1917 to 1940.

Davies developed many methods for restoring old recordings and disliked modern techniques for removing surface noise. While he appreciated attempts to 'clean up' recordings and to create new versions of old recordings for modern audiences, such as the stereophonic remastered recordings by Robert Parker, in general he said he preferred remasterings which "keep everything and do as little as possible" to the original recording, and thought the remastering engineer should "Add nothing, take nothing away". The presence of his name on the credit of a reissue is generally considered the mark of a quality product.

He started his own record label called Ristic (after his childhood nickname) in the late 1940s which produced reissued recordings from 1949 to 1972.

Davies was always generous with his time and his collection and wanted it to be available for other people to use for research and reissues after his death. The Borthwick Archive at York University has accepted the entire collection and is housing it in ideal conditions, and making a transfer suite available so that his wish can be carried out. Information about the collection collated from the collection catalogue is also available online from the University of York Digital Library, and a small selection of the tracks have been made available to listen to online.
