= Douglas Yeo =

American bass trombonist (born 1955)

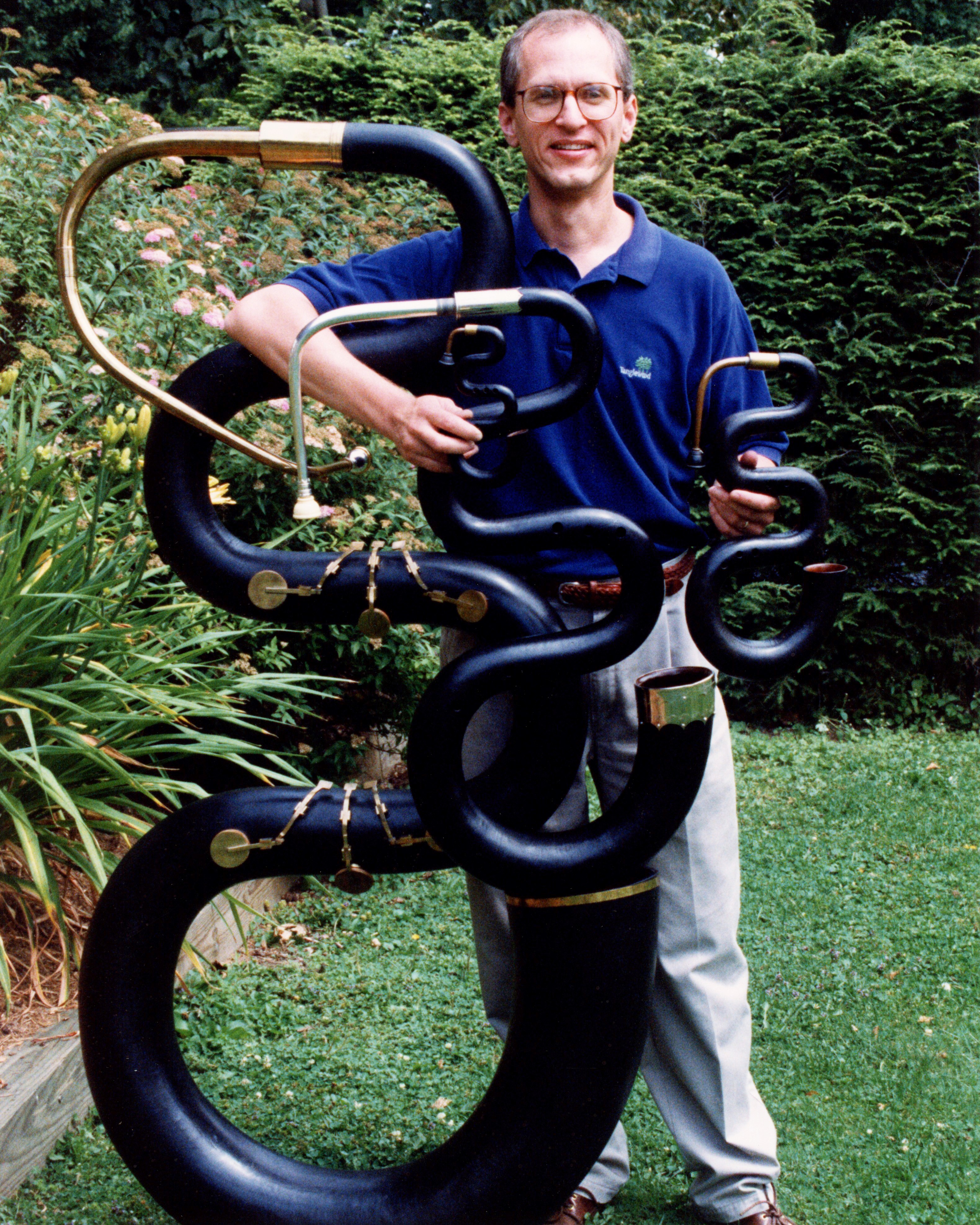
- Yeo in 1998

Background information
- Born: 1955 (age 70–71); Monterey, California, U.S.
- Genres: Classical music; Period performance; Brass band
- Occupations: Bass trombonist; Professor
- Instruments: Bass trombone; Serpent; Ophicleide; Sackbut; Buccin
- Years active: 1981–present
- Formerly of: Boston Symphony Orchestra; New England Brass Band
- Website: yeodoug.com

Douglas Yeo (born 1955) is an American bass trombonist who played in the Boston Symphony Orchestra from 1985 to 2012, where he held the John Moors Cabot Bass Trombone Chair. He was also on the faculty of the New England Conservatory. In 2012 he retired from the BSO and accepted a position as professor of trombone at the Arizona State University School of Music, a position he held until 2016. From 2019 to 2023, he was trombone professor at Wheaton College (Illinois), and he was professor of trombone at University of Illinois Urbana-Champaign from 2022 to 2024.

== Early life and education ==
Yeo's 1973 senior yearbook photo at Jefferson Township High School

Born in Monterey, California in 1955, Yeo first learned to play the trombone as a child living in Valley Stream, New York. He continued while living in the Oak Ridge section of Jefferson Township, New Jersey, graduating in 1973 from Jefferson Township High School.

Yeo earned a bachelor of music degree with honors from Wheaton College in Illinois and a Master of Arts degree from New York University. His principal teachers were Edward Kleinhammer and Keith Brown.

== Career ==
Before joining the Boston Symphony Orchestra/Boston Pops Orchestra in May 1985, Yeo was a member of the Baltimore Symphony Orchestra, (1981–1985). He also served as a faculty member of the Peabody Conservatory of Music, in Baltimore, and The Catholic University of America in Washington, D.C..

For four years, Yeo performed with the Goldman Band, the Vienna Philharmonic Orchestra, the Mostly Mozart Festival Orchestra, the Gerry Mulligan Big Band, and in orchestral pits for Broadway shows.

From 1998 to 2008, he was music director of the New England Brass Band, which released five compact disc recordings under his direction. In 2006, the New England Brass Band, under Mr. Yeo's direction, won first place in the Honors Section at the North American Brass Band Association National Championship, held in Louisville, Kentucky.

=== Retirement ===
He announced his retirement from the BSO, effective on August 27, 2012, at the conclusion of the Tanglewood 75th anniversary season. He moved to Arizona, where he was appointed Professor of Trombone at Arizona State University (Tempe).

== Awards and recognition ==
In 2014, he was the recipient of the International Trombone Association's highest honor, the ITA Award, presented to him "in recognition of his distinguished career and in acknowledgement of his impact on the world of trombone performance." He was given the International Trombone Association's Lifetime Achievement Award in 2024, "in recognition of his lifelong commitment to the trombone and a career that has reflected a commitment to excellence and achievement.

== Notable performances ==
Yeo has been a soloist with the Boston and Baltimore Symphony Orchestras; on both occasions becoming the first bass trombonist to perform as soloist with either orchestra.

In 1991, he gave the premiere of Vaclav Nelhybel's Concerto for Bass Trombone with the New England Conservatory Wind Ensemble.

He performed John Williams' Tuba Concerto with the Boston Pops Orchestra under Mr. Williams, becoming the first bass trombonist to perform the piece.

He gave the first performance of Lawrence Wolfe's Wildfire with the University of Washington Wind Ensemble in 1995.

He has premiered compositions by Norman Bolter including Temptation for serpent and string quartet, Ancestors for digeridoo, shofar and serpent, and La Grotte Cosquer for tenor and bass trombones.

In May 1997, he performed Simon Proctor's Concerto for Serpent and Orchestra with the Boston Pops Orchestra under the direction of John Williams.

In 1982, 1999, 2004, 2014, 2017, and 2018 he was a featured guest artist and clinician at the International Trombone Festival.

In 1999 he also performed the Christopher Brubeck Concerto for Bass Trombone and Orchestra with the Boston Pops Orchestra.

In 2000, his performance of the finale of the Brubeck Concerto, "James Brown in the Twilight Zone", was broadcast on television as part of the "Evening at Pops" series on the Public Broadcasting Service (PBS).

== Discography ==
His first solo recording, Proclamation, with The Black Dyke Mills Band, featured premieres of four newly commissioned works: Proclamation by Gordon Langford, Rainy Day in Rio by Goff Richards, Triptych by Lawrence Wolfe, and Tribute to George Roberts, arranged by Bill Geldard.

His second solo recording, Take 1, featured live solo performances given in concert from 1975 to 1997 including Alan Hovhannes' Symphony Number 34, Opus 310 for Bass Trombone and Strings.

His solo recording, Cornerstone, of arrangements of hymns and gospel songs for bass trombone and piano, was released in 2000.

In March 2002, he recorded Two of a Mind, an album of solos and duets with British tenor trombonist Nick Hudson, accompanied by the Williams Fairey Band and pianist David Chapman.

An album released in 2003, Le Monde du Serpent, features his playing serpent in repertoire spanning over three centuries.

== Historic brass speciality ==
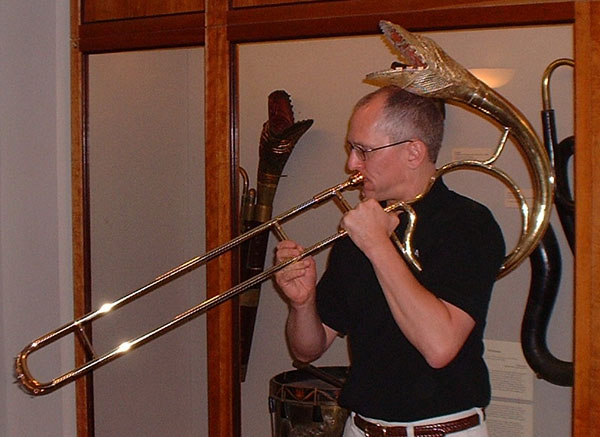
Douglas Yeo playing a buccin, Boston, 2006

In addition to playing the bass trombone, Yeo has played bass trumpet, contrabass trombone, and has become a leading exponent of historical brasses such as the buccin, serpent, ophicleide and bass sackbut.

In 2001, Yeo joined the orchestra of Boston Baroque for performances of Monteverdi's L'Orfeo (on bass sackbut) and Handel's Music for the Royal Fireworks (on serpent), the latter of which released in 2003 on the Telarc label. He joined Boston's Handel and Haydn Society for performances of Berlioz' Symphonie Fantastique (playing ophicleide) in 2002 and in the Monteverdi Vespers of 1610 (playing bass sackbut) in 2003.

In 2005, Yeo played serpent with wind players from the Handel & Haydn Orchestra on the Divertimento in B flat [St. Antoni Chorale] attributed to Haydn and in Henry Purcell's Dido and Aeneas. Also in 2005, he played ophicleide in the first North American performance on original instruments of Berlioz's Romeo and Juliet with Chorus pro Musica in Boston.

In June of the same year, Yeo presented a paper on serpent and ophicleide players in brass bands at the Great American Brass Band Festival's History Conference (Danville, Kentucky) and also performed a solo on ophicleide accompanied by the Athena Brass Band.

Yeo presented a recital of music for serpent at the 2000 Historic Brass Festival at the University of Connecticut (Storrs, Connecticut), and has lectured on the serpent at the Boston Museum of Fine Arts, the National Music Museum in Vermillion, South Dakota and the Metropolitan Museum of Art in New York City. He is named in the New Grove II Dictionary of Music's article on the serpent.

== Other activities ==
In addition to Yeo serving in teaching positions at New England Conservatory of Music, Arizona State University, Wheaton College, and University of Illinois Urbana-Champaign, he served on the faculty of the annual Hamamatsu International Wind Instrument Academy and Festival (Hamamatsu, Japan) eight times, and has been guest artist and teacher at the International Trombone and Tuba Festival (Beijing, China), the Dutch Bass Trombone Open (Amsterdam, The Netherlands), and the Nagoya Trombone Festival (Nagoya, Japan).

== Published work and research ==
Yeo has written more than forty articles on the trombone and orchestral playing for various publications, including International Musician, The Instrumentalist, The Brass Herald, Christianity Today, the Historic Brass Society Journal, the International Trombone Association Journal, and the T.U.B.A. Journal.

He did extensive research in the Boston Symphony archives, resulting in the publication of four photo/historical articles on BSO brass players from 1881 to the present; he mounted an exhibit at Symphony Hall on the history and hobbies of members of the Boston Symphony from 1881 to the present during the 1993–94 season. In 2000, he wrote a trombone teaching curriculum for the University of Reading's (United Kingdom) Music Teaching in Private Practice Initiative of their Department of Arts and Humanities in Education.

He is the co-author, along with Edward Kleinhammer, of Mastering the Trombone (Ensemble Publications. 1997), and is author of The One Hundred: Essential Works for the Symphonic Bass Trombonist (Encore Music Publishers, 2017/2024), and Serpents, Bass Horns and Ophicleides in the Bate Collection (Oxford University Press, 2019). In 2021, he published two books, Homer Rodeheaver and the Rise of the Gospel Music Industry (University of Illinois Press), co-authored with Kevin Mungons, and An Illustrated Dictionary for the Modern Trombone, Tuba, and Euphonium Player (Rowman & Littlefield).

Yeo was the plaintiff in a 1994 court case, Yeo vs. Lexington, that tested important issues in scholastic media law. In 1997 Yeo won on appeal to the First Circuit Court of Appeals but subsequently lost at the First Circuit Court of Appeals (en banc) and carried the case to the US Supreme Court which declined to hear it.
