= Buccin =

French trombone with serpent-like bell

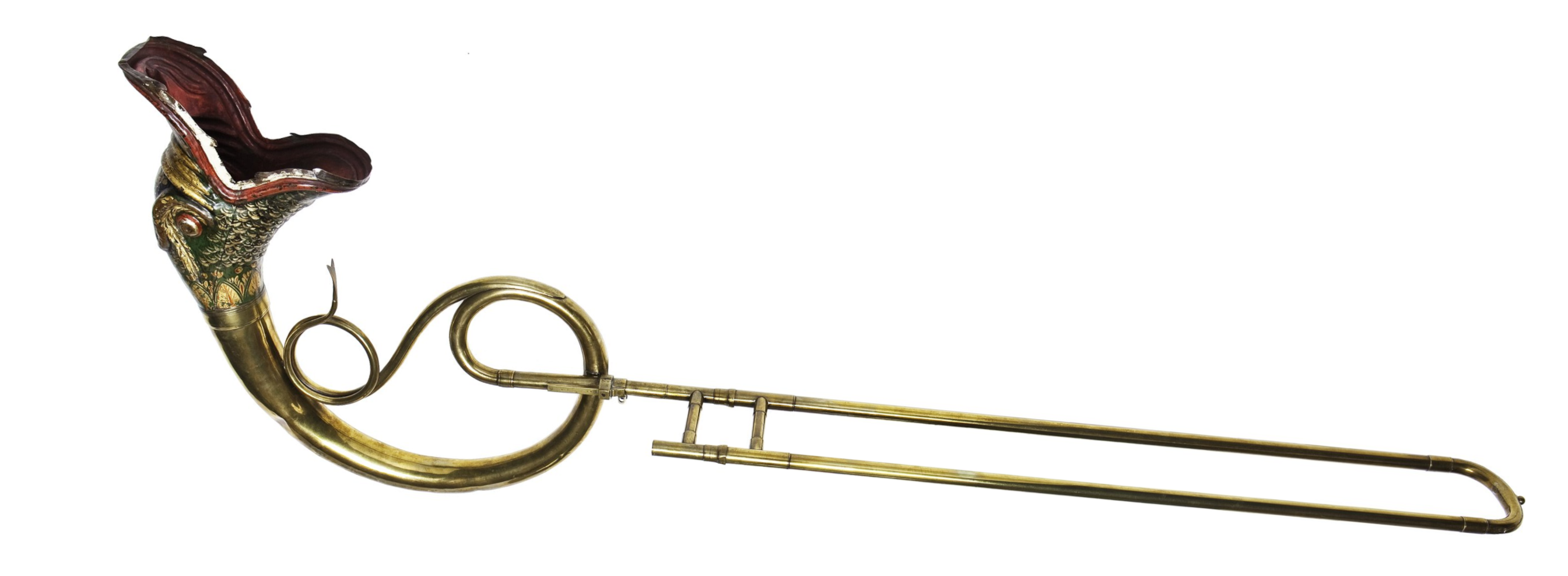
- Buccin in the St Cecilia's Hall collection, University of Edinburgh

Brass instrument
- Classification: Wind; Brass; Aerophone
- Hornbostel–Sachs classification: 423.22 (Sliding aerophone sounded by lip vibration)

Playing range
- E_{2} to B♭_{4}

Related instruments
- Trombone; Natural trumpet; Cornu; Buccina; Basson russe

The buccin, or buccin à tête de serpent, is a visually distinctive trombone popularized in military bands in France between 1810 and 1845 which subsequently faded into obscurity. It should not be confused with another instrument also called "buccin", revived in France in 1791 and modeled after the ancient Roman buccina which could deliver only four distinct notes.

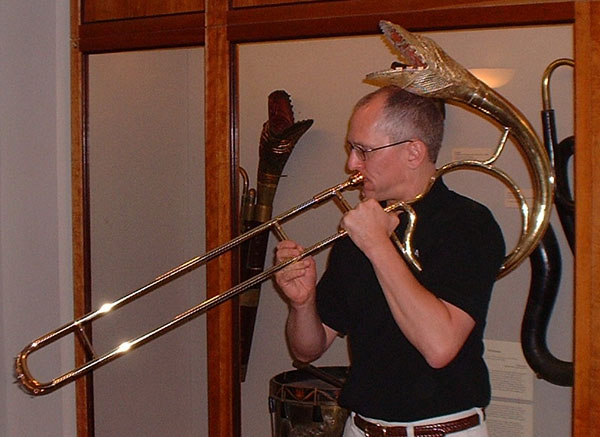
Douglas Yeo with a buccin

In the New Grove Dictionary of Music and Musicians, Arnold Myers devotes but two sentences to this type of buccin: "A form of trombone with a bell terminating in a stylized serpent's or dragon's head, often with a metal tongue, free to flap, protruding. Berlioz scored for buccin in the Kyrie and 'Resurrexit' of his Messe solennelle of 1824."

The exact date of the invention of the buccin has not been documented and apart from Berlioz's Messe, there is little in the way of surviving music for it. Yet we do know that the buccin was popularized in military bands in France between 1810 and 1845. Parades, outdoor festivals and civic celebrations were an important part of French cultural life from the time of the Revolution (1789) through most of the 19th century. The visual appeal of band members in uniform playing instruments with zoomorphic heads (in addition to the buccin, serpents, bass horns, bassoons and Russian bassoons—a form of upright serpent—all were made with decorative bells) was indisputable and manufacturers were quick to supply more and more exotic designs. The buccin bell was often vividly painted red, green and gold and the protruding metal tongue included by many makers would flap while marching and playing.

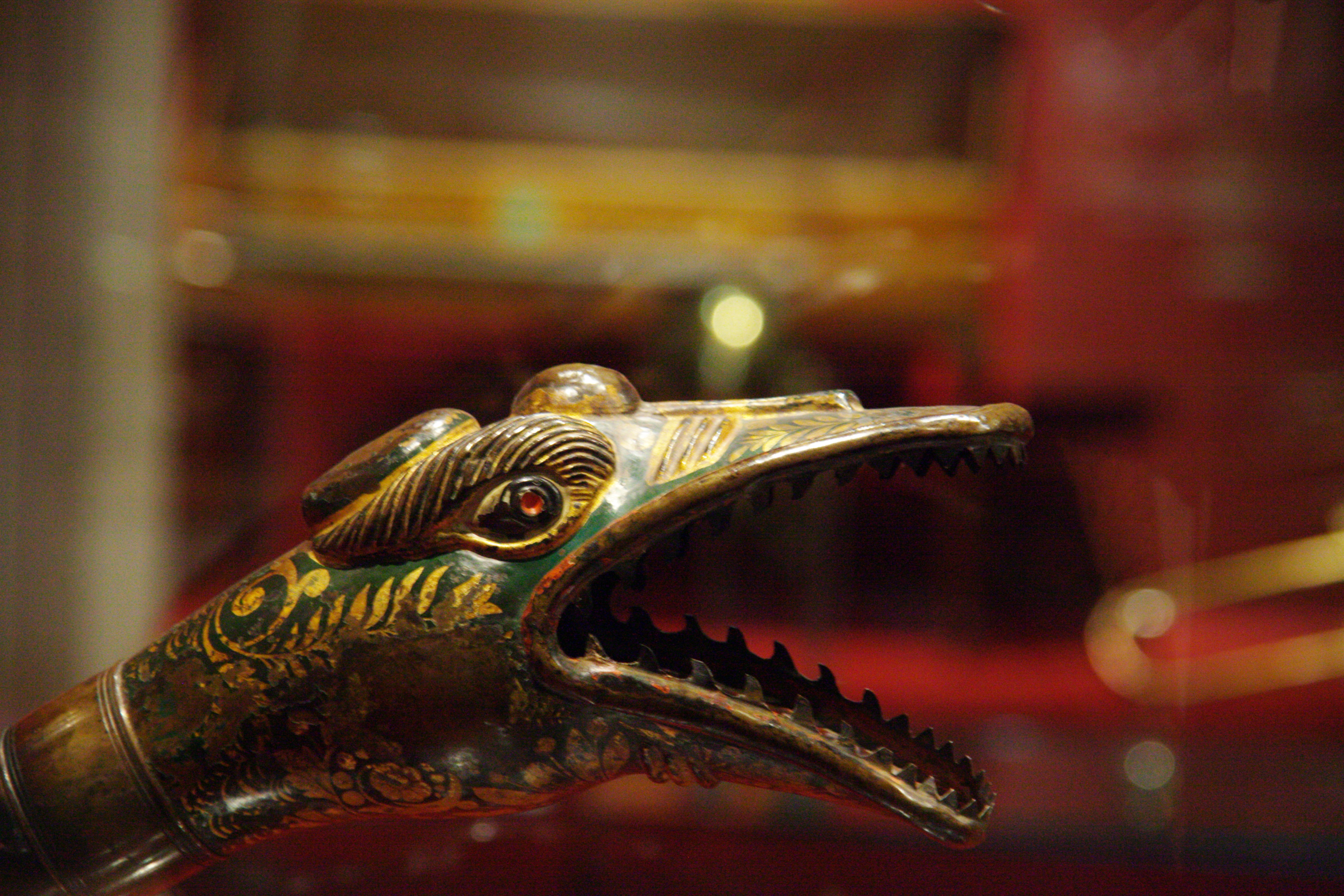
Bell of a buccin (MDMB 369), 1800–1860, in the musical instrument collection of the Museu de la Música de Barcelona

The sound of the buccin is something of a cross between a trombone and a French horn. At soft volumes it has a very warm, delicate sound because the bell is made of hammered tin or very thin brass. But it is also capable of an extreme fortissimo. Not everyone agrees on how to pronounce the name of the instrument, with variants including "boo-san", "bue-san", "boo-seen", "buk-kin" and "buck-sin".

There are more than 60 buccins in museums throughout the United States and Europe.. When the International Trombone Association was founded in 1972, it chose the buccin for its logo, after an instrument owned by New England Conservatory of Music in Boston. Lyon (France) seems to have been a center of buccin manufacturing with buccins made there currently on display in Paris (Dubois & Couturier) and Boston (Tabard). The photo above shows Douglas Yeo with a buccin made by another Lyon maker, François Sautermeister (c. 1830) that was restored in 2004 (and a new slide made after historical models) by James Becker of Osmun Music. Beautiful buccins by Guichard (Paris) are on display in Edinburgh and Brussels and the Metropolitan Museum of Art in New York has an extensive collection of buccins made in France, Italy and Belgium. John Webb, an English maker, has made modern reproduction buccins, one of which may be heard played by Ben Peck of Berlioz Historical Brass on Clifford Bevan's "Les Mots de Berlioz" on the CD Le Monde du Serpent. Stephen Wick played buccin on the premier recording of Berlioz's Messe under John Eliot Gardiner.
