= The Temperance Seven =

1950s British band

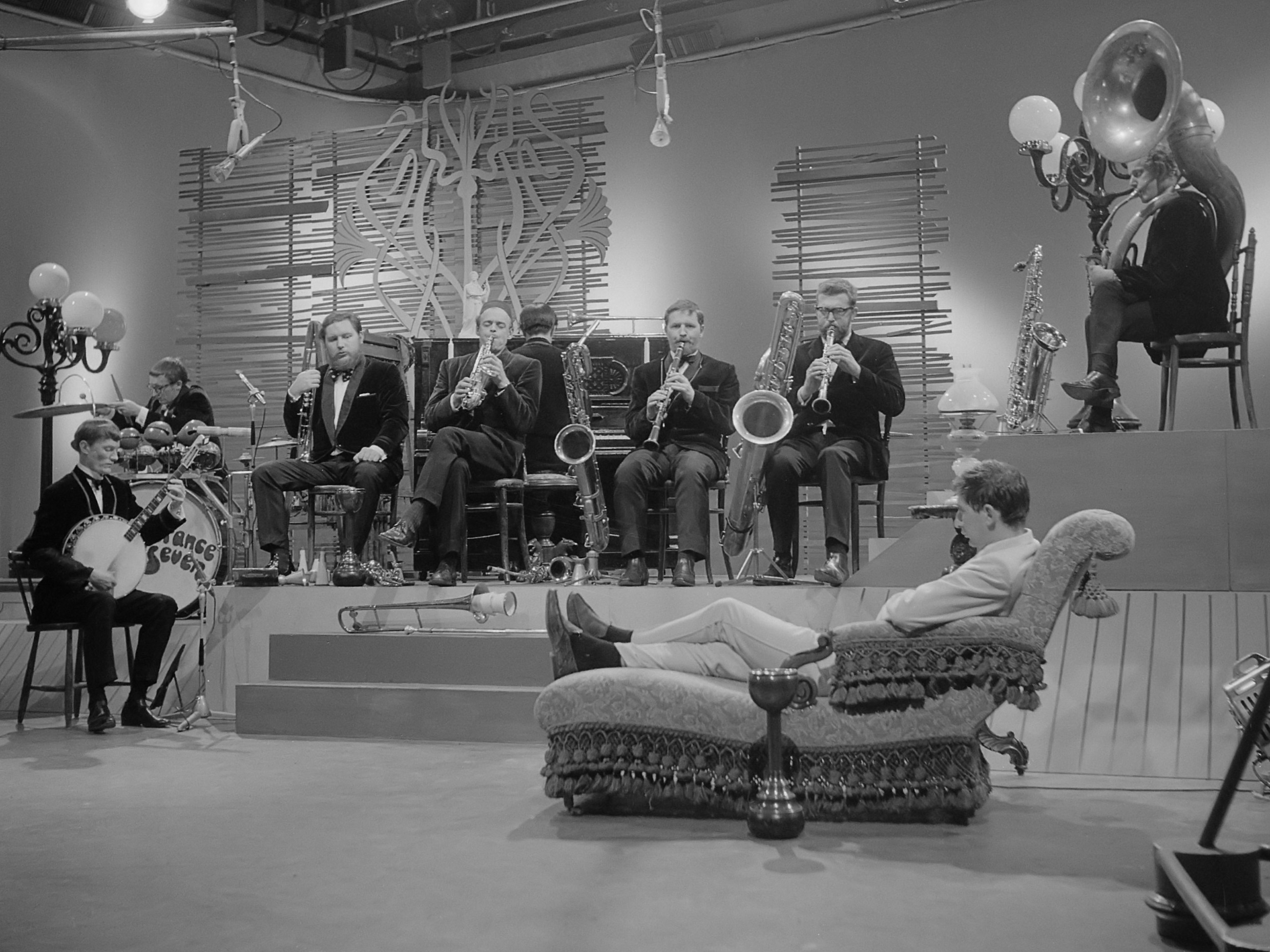
- The Temperance Seven in 1962

Background information
- Origin: London, England
- Genres: 1920s-style jazz
- Years active: 1950s–present
- Labels: Argo, Parlophone, World Record Club, Kapp, Hallmark, Marble Arch, MNW, DJM, Upbeat Recordings, Decca, WAM, MCA, Philips, His Master's Voice, Lake Records

The Temperance Seven is a British band originally active in the 1950s, specialising in 1920s-style jazz music. They have been known for their surreal performances.

== Career ==
The Temperance Seven was founded at Christmas 1955 by students at the Chelsea School of Art, though the band mythologized its foundation as dating from 1904 at the fictitious Pasadena Cocoa Rooms, Balls Pond Road, North London. The three founder members were Paul McDowell (who originally played trombone), Philip Harrison (who originally played banjo) and Brian Innes (drums). Gradually the band evolved into a nine-piece ensemble with a light-hearted and humorous performing style, although they were all serious musicians. The name "Temperance Seven" was suggested by Dougie Gray, of the Alberts.

In 1960, they recorded "Ukulele Lady" with vocal refrain by Peter Sellers, produced by George Martin. It was featured on Parlophone PMC 1131, a 12-inch album called Peter and Sophia (Loren).

In 1961, the Temperance Seven achieved a UK number-one single with "You're Driving Me Crazy", produced by George Martin. It was followed by "Pasadena", which reached number 4 in the UK Singles Chart. They toured the UK widely that year, often in shows promoted by their manager Ralph Peters, and their performances acquired a set routine beginning with the last few bars of "Pasadena" (which became their signature tune) and ending with the stirring strains of the "Gaumont-British News". By the summer of 1961, their fame was such that they appeared at the London Palladium for a two-week top-of-the-bill performance. This was arranged by Peters in combination with an appearance at that year's Royal Variety Performance.

Between 1962 and 1963, the Temperance Seven provided musical interludes for The Arthur Haynes Show on the BBC Light Programme.

Before the band became known nationally, Paul McDowell had also been a member of the Experimental Theatre Club revue, with Ian Davidson, Robin Grove-White and Doug Fisher. At the time, they had been performing their show, called **** (Four Asterisks), at the Edinburgh Fringe, but after the success of "You're Driving Me Crazy", McDowell left the group to tour with his band. This prompted Davidson to look for a replacement, and he found Terry Jones, future Monty Python member, who thus obtained his first chance to be part of the revue.

The Temperance Seven came to popularity during the resurgent trad-jazz era of the early 1960s. Their unique sound, coupled with their musicianship and ingeniously humorous compositions, set them apart from their contemporaries; however, they arrived at the cusp of that era and, as popular tastes changed with the emergence of the Beatles, the Temperance Seven gradually slipped into obscurity, although the Bonzo Dog Doo-Dah Band and Bob Kerr's Whoopee Band attempted to wear their mantle for several years whilst claiming no affiliation.

The Temperance Seven is also listed as the band for Spike Milligan and John Antrobus's stage play The Bed-Sitting Room, which opened at the Mermaid Theatre on 31 January 1963, with a subsequent production opening on 3 May 1967 at the Saville Theatre.

The original Temperance Seven were dissolved in the mid-1960s, but the band was resurrected in the latter part of that decade by drummer Dave Mills, who had replaced Brian Innes in 1966 and led the band for several years, firstly as The New Temperance Seven, and was instrumental in arranging their appearances in Hong Kong and Bahrain, where he eventually settled, to be replaced by Ian Howarth. The band continued to perform with new personnel and, from time to time, original members made guest appearances. During the 1980s, Chris Hook took over leadership of the band. The personnel has not changed since that time and the band continues to work around the UK. Many members of the original band reunited for a BBC Radio programme about the group in 2003.

== Members ==
The Temperance Seven dressed in a manner appropriate to the style of music they played. Some members also went under preposterous pseudonyms emphasised by the wearing of a minor yet conspicuous item of clothing – Colin Bowles a dog collar and John R. T. Davies a fez. "Josef Kronk", who supposedly arranged The Temperance Seven 1961 LP, was the collective pseudonym for the band. The early personnel included:

- Clifford Bevan (tuba [on first recording on Argo RG117], piano, trombone)
- Joe Clark (clarinet)
- "Canon" Colin Bowles (piano, harmonium)
- Alan Swainston Cooper (clarinet, bass clarinet, soprano saxophone, phonofiddle, pedal clarinet, Swanee whistle) (15 February 1931 – 22 August 2007)
- John R. T. Davies "Sheik Haroun of Wadi el Yadounir" (trombone, second trumpet, alto saxophone) (20 March 1927 – 25 May 2004)
- Martin Fry (sousaphone) (pseudonym: Franklyn D. Paverty)
- John Gieves-Watson (banjo, spoons)
- Phillip "Fingers" Harrison (banjo, alto saxophone, baritone saxophone)
- Cephas Howard "Captain, cashiered" (trumpet, euphonium). He died in France on 26 September 2021, aged 86.
- Brian Stanley Innes "Professor Emeritus" (percussion) (4 May 1928 – 14 July 2014)
- "Whispering" Paul McDowell (trombone, vocal refrains) (15 August 1931 – 2 May 2016)

Later members included:

- Pete March (cornet, singer)
- Ted Wood (vocals), who was an elder brother of Ronnie Wood, later of Faces and The Rolling Stones
- Melvyn Robinson (trombone)
- Ray Whittam (clarinet, baritone saxophone, bass saxophone, tenor saxophone)
- Bobby Mickleburgh (trombone, trumpet)
- Bill Greenow (clarinet, alto saxophone, penny whistle)
- Mac White (clarinet, alto saxophone)
- Malcolm Everson (baritone saxophone, alto saxophone)
- Will Hastie (clarinet, penny whistle)
- Geoff Simkins (alto saxophone, baritone saxophone)
- Bert Murray (piano, trombone)
- Chris Hook - (aka Chris Buckley) (sousaphone)
- Dave Mills (percussion)
- Ian Howarth (percussion)
- Graham Collicott (percussion)

== Selected discography ==
=== Singles ===
- "You're Driving Me Crazy" / "Charley My Boy" (1961: 7" Parlophone R4757) – UK No. 1 New Zealand (Lever hit parade) No.2
- "Pasadena" / "Sugar" (1961: 7" Parlophone R4781) – UK No. 4New Zealand (Lever hit parade) No. 7
- "Hard Hearted Hannah" / "Chili Bom Bom" (1961: 7" Parlophone R4823) – UK No. 28
- "Charleston" / "Black Bottom" (1961: 7" Parlophone R4851) – UK No. 22
- "Sahara" / "Everybody Loves My Baby" (1962: 7" Parlophone R4893)
- "Runnin' Wild" / "The Mooche" (1962: 7" Parlophone R4934)
- "Shake" / "Bye Bye Baby" (1962: 7" Parlophone R4953)
- "Ain't She Sweet" / "Seven And Eleven" (1963: 7" Parlophone R5022)
- "Thanks for the Melody" / "Easy Money" (1963: 7" Parlophone R5048)
- "From Russia With Love" / "PCQ" (1963: 7" Parlophone R5070)
- "Letkiss" / "Tajkaedi" (1964: 7" Parlophone R5236)
- "Miss Elizabeth Brown" / "Crazy" (1968: 7" MCA 1016)
- "Shepherd of the Hills" (1975: 7" DJM DJS 626)
- "Mach II March" / "Me and Jane in a Plane" (1976: 7" DJM DJS 673)
- "Pasadena" / "You're Driving Me Crazy" (EMI EMI2336)
- "You're Driving Me Crazy" / "Charley My Boy" (Old Gold OG 9385)
- "You're Driving Me Crazy" / "Charley My Boy" (His Master's Voice POP 2007)

=== Paul McDowell solo single ===
- "Frankie" (1961: 7" Fontana 267228TF)

=== EPs ===
- "The Temperance Seven Inch Record" (1960: EP Argo EAF 14)
- "The Temperance Seven" (1961: EP Parlophone GEP 8840)
- "The Charleston and other selections" (1961: EP Parlophone GEP 8850)
- "1961" (1961: EP Parlophone GEP 8857)
- "Runnin' Wild" (1962: EP Parlophone GEP 8872)

=== Albums ===
- The Temperance Seven Plus 1 – Tiger Rag (1957 LP: Argo RG 117) – UK No. 19 (re-released as The World of the Temperance Seven 1973 LP: Argo SPA 302)
- The Temperance Seven 1961 (1961 LP: Parlophone PMC 1152 & PCS 3021) – UK #8 (re-released as Pasadena: World Record Club ST 10002)
- BBC Sessions (1962 LP: Ristic) [Private Pressing]
- Family Album (1964 LP: Parlophone PMC 1236 & PCS 3059, 1964) (re-released as Family Album: World Record Club TP 727)
- Direct from the Ballspond Cocoa Rooms (LP: Music For Pleasure MFP 1322)
- The New Temperance Seven (1970 LP: Hallmark HMA 205)
- The New Temperance Seven in Sweden (1972 LP: Philips 6414 303)
- The Temperance Seven in Hong Kong (1975 LP: DJM DJSML 2013)
- 21 Years On (1976 LP: DJM DJM 22043)
- Tea for Eight (1989 LP: Upbeat URLP101, 1989 CD: Upbeat URCD 203)
- 33 Not Out (1990 CD: Upbeat URCD103)
- The Writing on the Wall (1992 CD: Upbeat URCD108)
- Pasadena and the Lost Cylinders: Music from the Archives (1997 CD: Lake LACD 77) [recorded 1960(1–9), 1961(10–11), 1962(12–19), 1963(20–26), 1967(27–28)]
- Live & In Full Colour – Part 1 (2000 CD: TS101) (Private Pressing recorded at The Grayshott Club, Hindhead)
- Live & In Full Colour – Part 2 (2000 CD: TS102) (Private Pressing recorded at The Grayshott Club, Hindhead)
- The Parlophone Recordings Vol.1 1960–1962 (2000 CD: Lake LACD 138)
- The Parlophone Recordings Vol.2 1962–1965 (2001 CD: Lake LACD 142)
- Those BBC Years (2002 CD: Upbeat URCD185)
- Diamond Jubilee Stomp (2017 CD: Private Release from website)

=== Other appearances ===
The Temperance Seven also appeared on:

- "Ukulele Lady" on the album Peter and Sophia (1960 LP: Parlophone PMC 1131)
- The Alberts, The Bonzo Dog Doo Dah Band, The Temperance Seven (1971 LP: Starline SRS 5151)
- By Jingo It's British Rubbish (1998 CD: HUX 015)

== Filmography ==
- It's Trad, Dad! (1962)
- Take Me Over (1963)
- The Wrong Box (1966)
- The Temperance Seven in Hong Kong (1976)

== See also ==
- Pasadena Roof Orchestra

== Bibliography ==
- The New Musical Express Book of Rock, 1975, Star Books, ISBN 0-352-30074-4
- The Pythons Autobiography by The Pythons, 2003, Orion books, ISBN 0-7528-6425-4
