= Edward Kleinhammer =

Edward Kleinhammer (1919–2013) was an American orchestral bass trombonist and pedagogue, who was bass trombonist with the Chicago Symphony Orchestra from 1940 to 1983.

== Early life and education ==
Born in Chicago, Illinois, on August 31, 1919, Edward Kleinhammer started his musical training at age ten on violin and switched to trombone when he was fourteen. He attended the Carter Harrison Technical School on Chicago's south side. He studied trombone with David Anderson and Edward Geffert, both Chicago Symphony trombonists. In 1938 he joined the Chicago Civic Orchestra. In 1940, following a nationwide competition, he joined Leopold Stokowski's All-American Youth Orchestra.

== Career ==
=== Chicago Symphony Orchestra ===
In 1940, at age 21, Kleinhammer auditioned for and was invited by Frederick Stock to play trombone and bass trombone with the Chicago Symphony Orchestra. A member of the Chicago Symphony brass section for forty-five years, Kleinhammer served under seven music directors: Stock, Desire Defauw, Artur Rodzinski, Fritz Reiner, Jean Martinon and Sir Georg Solti. He can be heard on hundreds of recordings of the Chicago Symphony recorded during his tenure. Upon his retirement, the Chicago Symphony Orchestra awarded Kleinhammer the Theodore Thomas Medallion for Distinguished Service. Jay Friedman, former Principal Trombonist of the Chicago Symphony said of Kleinhammer:

“What a joy it is to work with Ed; he is the most conscientious musician I have ever met. He is a fanatic about practicing. He arrives hours before rehearsals and concerts to make sure his preparation is as good as it can be. Because his personal standards of playing and conduct are so high, Ed never tries to compete with anyone but himself. He is humble about his own talents and generous in praising others.... There was only one way he could be a musician, and that was by giving 110 percent of himself.” — Jay Friedman, principal trombone of the CSO in 1985.

=== Military service ===
During World War II, Kleinhammer interrupted his Chicago Symphony service, to serve with the United States Army. From June 1942 until August 1945, he served with the 447th Army Air Forces Band.

=== Pedagogue and development of the modern bass trombone ===
A master performer and teacher, Kleinhammer taught in his studio located in the Fine Arts Building on Michigan Avenue, Chicago. He inspired hundreds of trombone players, many of whom went on to their own professional careers with leading symphony orchestras. In 1963, he wrote the seminal trombone method book, The Art of Trombone Playing, published by Summy-Birchard. The work was expanded in 1985 with the publication of Mastering the Trombone, a book he co-authored with Douglas Yeo, a former student and retired bass trombonist with the Boston Symphony Orchestra. Kleinhammer invented and developed the optional E attachment for bass trombone, manufactured by the Frank Holton company, that extended the lower range of the instrument.

The Edward Kleinhammer Orchestral Bass Trombone Competition is named in his honor.

== Death ==
At age 94, Kleinhammer died on November 30, 2013, in his home in Hayward Wisconsin. His wife, Dessie, survived him.
