= The Alberts, The Bonzo Dog Doo Dah Band, The Temperance Seven =

Compilation album by The Alberts, Bonzo Dog Doo-Dah Band, & The Temperance Seven
- Released: 1971
- Genre: Comedy rock
- Length: 40:32
- Label: Starline SRS 5151
- Compiler: Chris Ellis

The Alberts, The Bonzo Dog Doo Dah Band, The Temperance Seven is a singles compilation album released in 1971, notable for the first time both sides of the first two Bonzo Dog Doo-Dah Band singles were released in stereo.

== Track listing ==
=== Side one ===
1. "You're Driving Me Crazy" — The Temperance Seven
2. "Charley My Boy" — The Temperance Seven
3. "Thanks for the Melody "— The Temperance Seven
4. "P.C.Q. (Please Charleston Quietly)" — The Temperance Seven
5. "Button up your Overcoat" — The Bonzo Dog Doo Dah Band
6. "My Brother Makes the Noises for the Talkies" — The Bonzo Dog Doo Dah Band
7. "Morse Code Melody" — The Alberts

=== Side two ===
1. "Pasadena" — The Temperance Seven
2. "Sugar" — The Temperance Seven
3. "Easy Money" — The Temperance Seven
4. "The Shake" — The Temperance Seven
5. "I'm Gonna Bring a Watermelon to my Girl Tonight" — The Bonzo Dog Doo Dah Band
6. "Alley Oop" — The Bonzo Dog Doo Dah Band
7. "Sleepy Valley" — The Alberts
