= Clifford Bevan =

English tubist and musicologist (1934–2024)

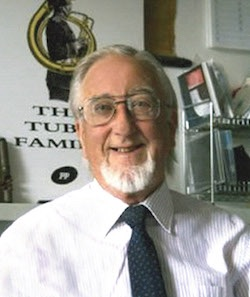
Clifford Bevan, c. 2000

Clifford James Bevan (25 January 1934 – 26 December 2024) was an English tubist, trombonist, organologist, music historian, composer and publisher. He specialised in historically informed performance, including historical low brass instruments such as the ophicleide, cimbasso and serpent.

== Life and career ==
Bevan was born in Manchester on 25 January 1934. His writing includes nine books, musical compositions, many scholarly articles, and significant contributions to The New Grove Dictionary of Music and Musicians, Cambridge Companion to Brass Instruments and the Cambridge Encyclopedia of Brass Instruments. He co-edited with Craig Kridel the historical instruments section of the ITEA Journal, and his book The Tuba Family, first published in 1978 and expanded in a second edition published in 2000, is considered a standard text about the instrument and its history.

Bevan's performance career included pianist and arranger for The Temperance Seven in the early 1960s, principal tuba of the Royal Liverpool Philharmonic 1964–1972, freelancing with London orchestras and West End theatre musicals and shows, and later moving into publishing and arts administration. He was instrumental in the 20th century rediscovery of the serpent and ophicleide, playing with Christopher Monk's London Serpent Trio, and performing an ophicleide recital at the London Horniman Museum in 1990 which was likely the first full-length recital in the instrument's modern revival.

In 2008, the International Tuba Euphonium Association honoured Bevan's contributions by establishing its annual Clifford Bevan Award, for "Meritorious work in low brass scholarship."

Bevan died on 26 December 2024, at the age of 90.

== Awards ==
- Historic Brass Society: Christopher Monk Award, 2008
- ITEA: Lifetime Achievement Award, 2010
- Galpin Society: Anthony Baines Prize, 2021

== Publications ==
- The Tuba Family; London: Faber & Faber, 1978; Second edition, Winchester: Piccolo Press, 2000
- Musical Instrument Collections in the British Isles, Winchester: Piccolo Press, 1990
