= Simon Proctor =

British composer and pianist (born 1959)

Simon Proctor (born 1959) is a British composer and pianist, known for his works for unusual instruments.

== Education ==
Proctor graduated from the Royal Academy of Music where he gained the GRSM degree, LRAM diploma in piano and several prizes for composition, orchestration and piano.

== Career ==
His best-known work, the Concerto for Serpent and Orchestra, was written in 1987 when the composer was attached to the University of South Carolina. Its premiere, with the soloist Alan Lumsden and the University of South Carolina Chamber Orchestra under Donald Portnoy, was at the First International Serpent Festival on 21 October 1989. Douglas Yeo performed it again on 31 March 1997 at New England Conservatory, and then on 29 and 30 May 1997 with the Boston Pops Orchestra conducted by John Williams, both in Boston.

Other compositions include his Concerto for Keyed Bugle and Orchestra. The Amherst Suite also features 8 serpents. He composed a Jubilee Fanfare for the RHS Bicentennial, which was attended by Prince Philip, Duke of Edinburgh.

He has also composed a great number of other works, including 26 concertos, and many works for solo piano including a seven-part fugue.

He composed a symphony, which included a hand bell ensemble, for the Lincoln Park Academy Orchestra in 1998.

He composed a James Bond Piano Concerto. This had its world premiere on 20 February 2010 in Cadogan Hall, London. It was performed by the London Gay Symphony Orchestra. Thomas Pandolfi was the solo pianist.

Proctor is a graduate of the Royal Academy of Music. He lives in Sevenoaks, Kent and teaches piano in several schools with Kent Music centre, and privately. He has performed solo piano recitals in the UK, Germany, USA and The Bahamas. Simon has played principal keyboard for Les Miserables and other shows, and has acted as musical director for other productions.

He has made two CDs of his compositions, Sounds of Kent – Piano (recorded by 12-year-old Tyler Hay), and Sounds of Kent – Woodwind (recorded by the Pneuma Quintet, a wind quintet of students from the Royal Academy of Music). A movement from his Concerto for Ophicleide and Orchestra has been recorded by Nick Byrne and David Miller. In 2022 his album entitled Virtuoso Piano Works, played by Tyler Hay, was released by American Label PARMA Recordings. His Serpent Concerto was recorded by Douglas Yeo on the CD Le Monde du Serpent.

== Works ==
=== Concertos ===
- Serpent Concerto (performed by Douglas Yeo)
- Lyrical Concerto
- Keyed Bugle Concerto
- Ophicleide Concerto
- Sackbut Concerto
- Flute Concertino
- Oboe Concertino
- Clarinet Concertino
- Bassoon Concertino
- Blazing Bassoon Concerto
- Contrabassoon Concerto
- Saxophone Concerto
- Recorder Concerto
- Horn Concerto
- Trumpet Concerto
- Trombone Concertos No. 1-3
- Tuba Concerto (With obbligato tuba in orchestra, and double cadenza for both tubas in the first movement. Premiered in 1996, Sydney, Australia by Susan Bradley, tuba, with National Chamber Opera of Australia, conducted by Chris Howes)
- Viola Concerto
- Cello Concerto
- Piano Concertos No. 1-3
- James Bond Piano Concerto
- Frank Sinatra Piano Concerto
- Andrew Lloyd Webber Piano Concerto
- Queen Piano Concerto (performed with Saigon Philharmonic Orchestra at 1hr 10)
- Hollywood Piano Concerto
- The Sound of Music Piano Concerto
- Christmas Piano Concerto
- Piano Favourites Concerto
- Broadway Piano Concerto
- Coldplay Piano Concerto

=== Schools Musicals ===
- A Byte Of Ancient Greece
- Enter The Egyptians
- A View Of The Victorians
- Robin Hood In the Jungle
- The Pied Pest Control Officer
- Arthur - The Early Years

=== Serpent ===
- Amherst Suite (8 serpents)
- 3 Songs for 3 Serpents
- A Snake In The Glass (serpent & glass harmonica)
- The Original Sin (soprano & serpent)

=== Solo Piano ===
- 3 Sonatas
- 23 Rhapsodies (Notably Rhapsody No. 17, No. 18 and No. 21)
- 9 Nocturnes (Including: Euphonious Nocturne, Nocturne at Lake Maggiore, Nocturne in Silver and Blue)
- 15 Fugal Preludes
- 12 Preludes
- 8 Udes (Edudes!)
- Paganini Metamorphosis
- Dances
- Waltzes
- Edible Fugues
- Barcaroles
- Dodecaphonic Pieces
- Distant Bell and others

=== Stage Works ===
- Mayhew's London
- Oh Yeah

=== Brass Quintent ===
- Asprey Fanfare
- Fanfare Jubilo

=== Choral and orchestral ===
- The Three Kings
- Fables
- The Brook

=== Flute, Piano & Percussion ===
- Dorian Rhapsody

=== Harp Trio ===
- The Three Of Harps (piano)
- A Piece Of Pluck

=== Orchestral ===
- Hastings Hornpipe
- The Reel McCoy

=== Piano Trio ===
- Metamorphosis (piano trio consisting of piano, violin, cello)

=== String Orchestra ===
- Beauchamp Dances (piano)

=== Wind Band ===
- Windy City (symphonic concert band, dedicated to the College of Lake County Wind Ensemble)
- Quietude

=== Wind Ensemble ===
- Winds Of Change

=== Wood wind ===
- Vögel I-XII (flute and piano)
- Whippersnapper (piccolo and piano)
- Introduction & Romp (oboe and piano)
- Redevelopment (clarinet and piano)
- Eos (alto saxophone and piano)
- The Jester (flute, oboe and clarinet)
- Pneumusic (wind quintet: flute, oboe, clarinet, horn, bassoon)
- Brown Study (flute, oboe, piano)
- Witz (solo clarinet)

=== Some Other Notable Works ===
- Apex 101 (piano)
- Hosedown (quintet of garden hoses of different lengths, played with brass instrument mouthpieces, in the style of a western hoe-down, dedicated to the Antioch Brass Quintet)
- Light Metal (suite for euphonium & tuba quartet, dedicated to the Heavy Metal Society quartet; also a version titled "Lighter Metal" for saxophone quartet)
- Miniatures at an Exhibition (a quick walk through Moussorgsky's "Pictures and an Exhibition" for euphonium & tuba quartet; also a version for saxophone quartet)

== UK Publishers ==
- Brasswind
- Peters Edition
- Studio Music

== US Publishers ==
- Hal Leonard
- Trevor Warner Music
- Drake Mabry Publishing
- Presto Sheet Music
