= Home in Pasadena =

1923 song by Harry Warren

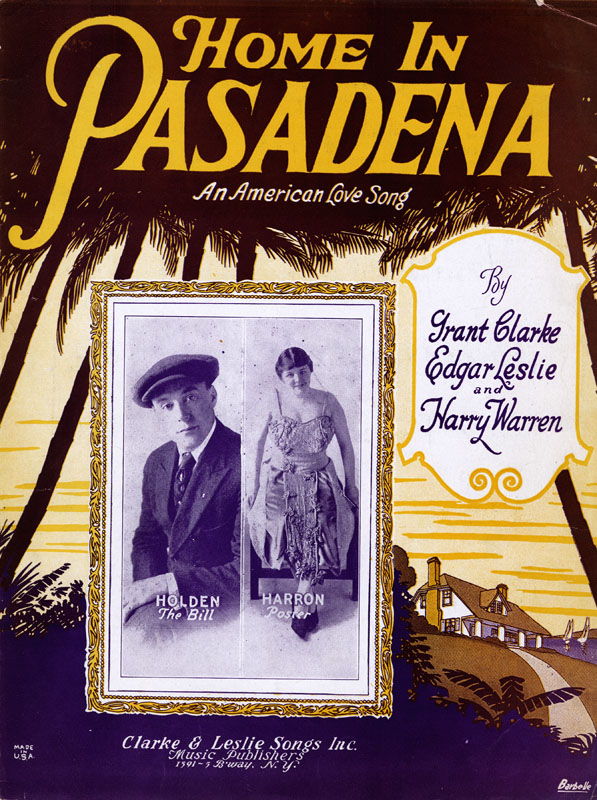

Song
- Published: 1923
- Genre: Popular music
- Composer: Harry Warren
- Lyricists: Grant Clarke; Edgar Leslie

"Home in Pasadena" is a song with music by Harry Warren and lyrics by Grant Clarke and Edgar Leslie. In the song, the singer, about to travel to Pasadena by Pullman Train, describes the attractions of his destination.

It was published in 1923, early in Warren's songwriting career, a year after his first published song "Rose of the Rio Grande". In 1924 it was recorded by Paul Whiteman, by Billy Murray with Ed Smalle, and by Al Jolson.

The British band The Temperance Seven recorded the song, with the title "Pasadena", in 1961. The Pasadena Roof Orchestra, a British band founded in 1969, was named after the song.
