= Serpent (instrument) =

Early lip-reed wind instrument

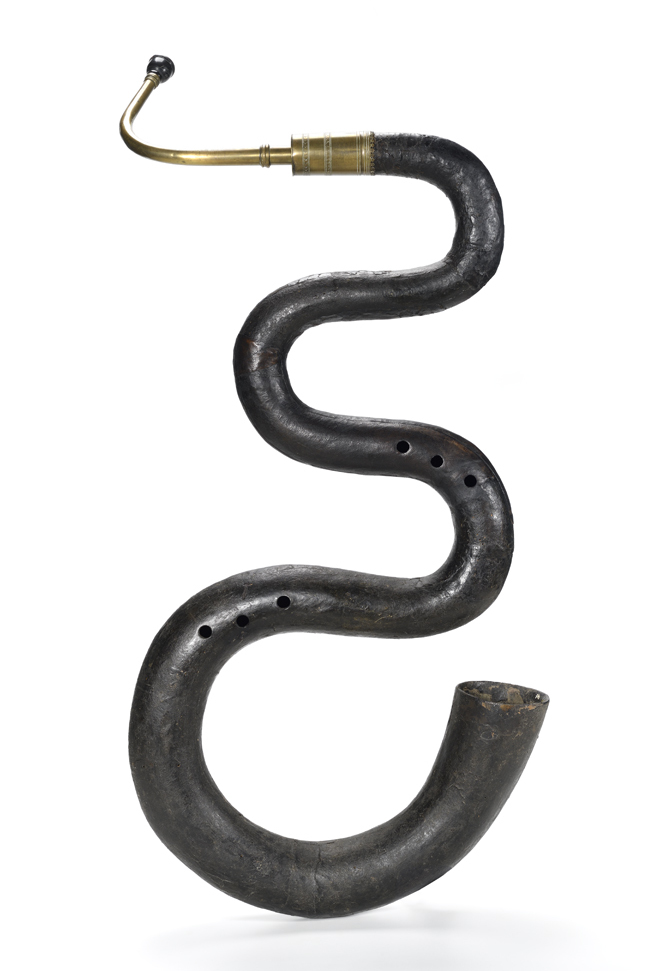
- Serpent, late 18th century Italy. Civic Museum of Modena

Brass instrument
- Other names: Serpentone
- Classification: Wind; Brass; Aerophone
- Hornbostel–Sachs classification: 423.213 (labrosones with fingerholes with wide conical bore)
- Developed: Late 16th century

Playing range
- Range of the serpent; notes below C₂ are obtained with the embouchure

Related instruments
- Cornett; Ophicleide; Cimbasso; Tuba

Musicians
- Clifford Bevan; Bernard Fourtet; Michel Godard; Volny Hostiou; Phil Humphries; Alan Lumsden; Christopher Monk; Andrew van der Beek; Patrick Wibart; Steve Wick; Douglas Yeo

Builders
- Christopher Monk Instruments; Early Music Shop; Pierre Ribo; Stephan Berger

Sound sample
- Scarborough Fair (excerpt) serpent played by Kathryn Rose

The serpent is a low-pitched early wind instrument in the lip-reed family, developed in the Renaissance era. It has a trombone-like mouthpiece, with six tone holes arranged in two groups of three fingered by each hand. It is named for its long, conical bore bent into a snakelike shape, and unlike most brass instruments is made from wood with an outer covering of leather or parchment. A distant ancestor of the tuba, the serpent is related to the cornett and was used for bass parts from the 17th to the early 19th centuries.

In the early 19th century, keys were added to improve intonation, and several upright variants were developed and used, until they were superseded first by the ophicleide and ultimately by the valved tuba. After almost entirely disappearing from orchestras, the serpent experienced a renewed interest in historically informed performance practice in the mid-20th century. Several contemporary works have been commissioned and composed, and serpents are again made by a small number of contemporary manufacturers. The sound or timbre of a serpent is somewhere between a bassoon and a euphonium, and it is typically played in a seated position, with the instrument resting upright between the player's knees.

== Construction ==
Although closely related to the cornett, the serpent has thinner walls, a more conical bore, and no thumb-hole. The original serpent was typically built from hardwood, usually walnut or other tonewoods like maple, cherry, or pear, or sometimes softer woods like poplar. In France, the instrument was made from bonding two double-S-shaped halves, each carved from a single large piece of wood. In England, it was usually made from several smaller curved tubular wooden segments, each made by gluing two hollowed halves together. The whole instrument was then glued and bound with an outer covering of leather. A small number were made instead from copper or brass; one brass serpent in the Museo internazionale e biblioteca della musica in Bologna was built in 1773 with an added outer layer of leather.

The instrument uses a mouthpiece about the same size as a trombone mouthpiece, originally made from ivory, horn or hardwood. The cup profiles of most historical serpent and bass horn mouthpieces were a distinctly hemispherical or ovate bowl shape, with a sharper-edged and narrower "throat" at the bottom of the cup than modern trombone mouthpieces, before expanding more-or-less conically through the shank. The mouthpiece fits into the bocal or crook, a small length of brass tubing that emerges from the top wooden segment.

The serpent has six tone holes, in two groups of three, fingered by each hand. It is initially challenging to play the instrument with good intonation, due in large part to the positions of the tone holes. They are arranged mainly to be accessible to the player's fingers, rather than in acoustically correct positions, which for some of them would be out of reach. The lower tone holes are too small to act effectively to shorten the air column, but by dampening resonances they nevertheless aid note selection and contribute to the serpent's characteristic soft timbre. While early serpents were keyless, later instruments added keys for additional holes out of reach of the fingers to improve intonation, and extend range. A mid-19th century model by London instrument maker Thomas Key has 14 keys, and survives in St Fagans National Museum of History in Cardiff, Wales.

Modern replicas are made by several specialist instrument makers, employing acoustic analysis and modern fabrication materials and techniques to further improve the serpent's intonation. Some of these techniques include use of modern composite materials and polymers, 3D printing, and changing the placement of tone holes. Swiss serpent maker Stephan Berger in collaboration with French jazz musician Michel Godard has developed an improved serpent based on studying well-preserved museum instruments, and also makes a lightweight model from carbon fibre. English serpent player and musicologist Clifford Bevan remarked that Berger's instruments are much improved, finally allowing players to approach the serpent "in partnership rather than in combat". A modern basson russe is made by French instrument maker Jérôme Wiss.

=== Sizes ===
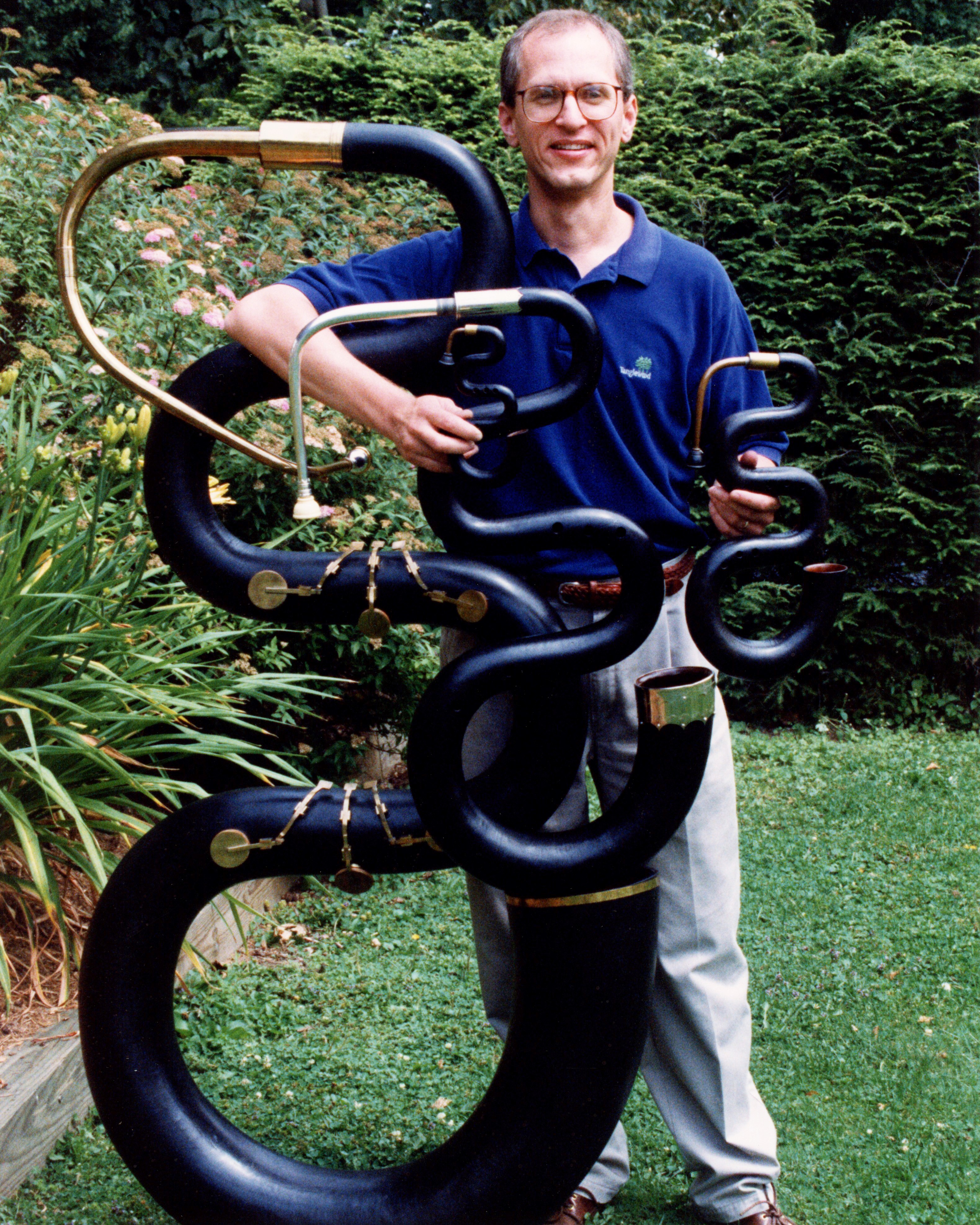
Douglas Yeo with serpents in four sizes, from largest to smallest: contrabass, bass, tenor, and soprano

The majority of surviving specimens in museums and private collections are nominally bass serpents built in eight-foot (8′) C, thus having a total tubing length of about 8 feet (2.4 m). A few slightly smaller specimens were built in D, and military serpents could sometimes vary in pitch between D♭ and B♭.

The tenor serpent (or serpet; French: serpenteau) arose in the 1960s when English early music specialist and instrument maker Christopher Monk began his efforts to produce modern reproduction serpents by first building a half-sized pattern, which equated to a tenor size in 4′ C. Through a pantographic milling process, he scaled up the pattern by 2× to carve a bass serpent. Since he could just as easily carve at 1×, he was also able to produce tenor serpents popular in serpent ensembles, and usable by players with smaller fingers. The soprano serpent, or worm, was built by scaling the tenor serpent by 0.5× to produce an instrument in 2′ C, two octaves higher than the standard serpent. It first appeared in the 1980s, made as a novelty instrument by Monk. There is no repertoire or other evidence of the historical existence of these sizes.

Contrabass serpent, c. 1840, being played at St Cecilia's Hall, University of Edinburgh

The contrabass serpent, nicknamed the anaconda and built in 16′ C one octave below the serpent, was an English invention of the mid-19th century with no historical repertoire. The prototype instrument was built c. 1840 by Joseph and Richard Wood in Huddersfield as a double-sized English military serpent, and survives in the University of Edinburgh museum collection. Its use of keys, progressively larger tone holes, and an open top tone hole make it essentially a wooden, serpent-shaped contrabass ophicleide. During the serpent's modern revival, two more contrabass serpents were built in the original serpent ordinaire form in the 1990s by Christopher Monk's workshop, by doubling the pattern for a bass serpent. They were called "George" and "George II". The first, commissioned by musicologist and serpent player Philip Palmer, was owned by American trombonist and serpent player Douglas Yeo for a time and features in some of his serpent recordings. At least four other contrabass serpents have also been built: one from PVC piping in 1986, two from box plywood based on a "squarpent" design by American serpent player and curator Paul Schmidt, and one in 2014 from spare tuba and sousaphone parts.

== History ==
There is little direct material or documentary evidence for the exact origin of the serpent. French historian Jean Lebeuf claimed in his 1743 work Mémoires Concernant l'Histoire Ecclésiastique et Civile d’Auxerre that the serpent was invented in 1590 by Edmé Guillaume, a clergyman in Auxerre, France, which is generally accepted. Some scholars propose that the serpent may have evolved from large, curved bass cornetts that were in use in Italy in the 16th century, but the lack of knowledge of the serpent in early 17th century Italy, or surviving early serpents outside of France, counts against this idea. The serpent was certainly used in France since the early 17th century, to strengthen the cantus firmus and bass voices of choirs in plainchant. This original traditional serpent was known as the serpent ordinaire or serpent d'église (lit. 'ordinary serpent' or 'church serpent').

Around the middle of the 18th century, the serpent began to appear in military bands, chamber ensembles, and later in orchestras. In England, particularly in the south, the serpent was used in west gallery music played in Church of England parish churches and village bands until the mid 19th century.

=== Military serpents ===
Types of traditional and military serpents
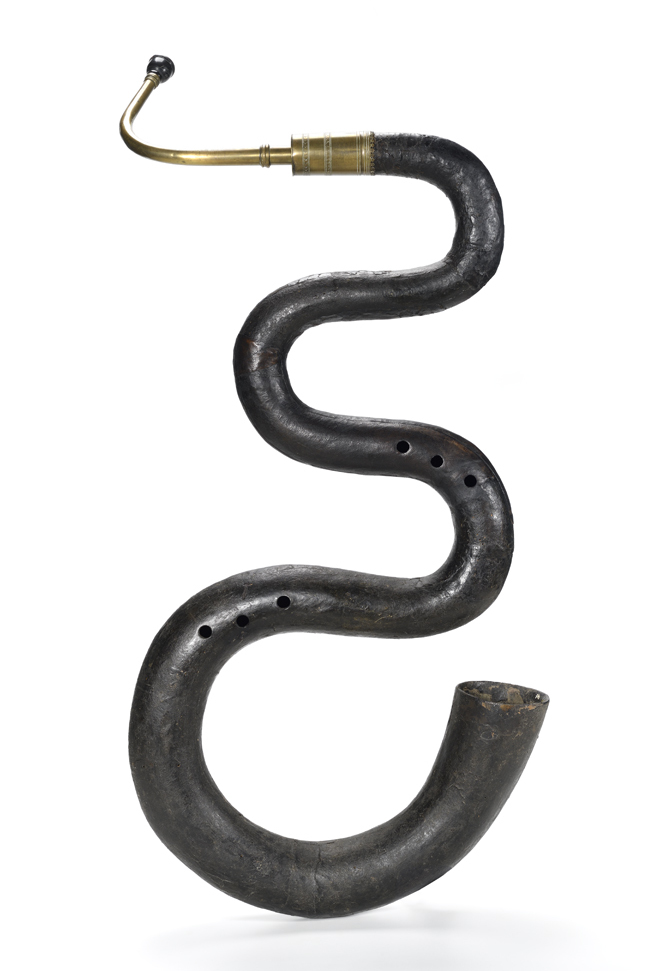
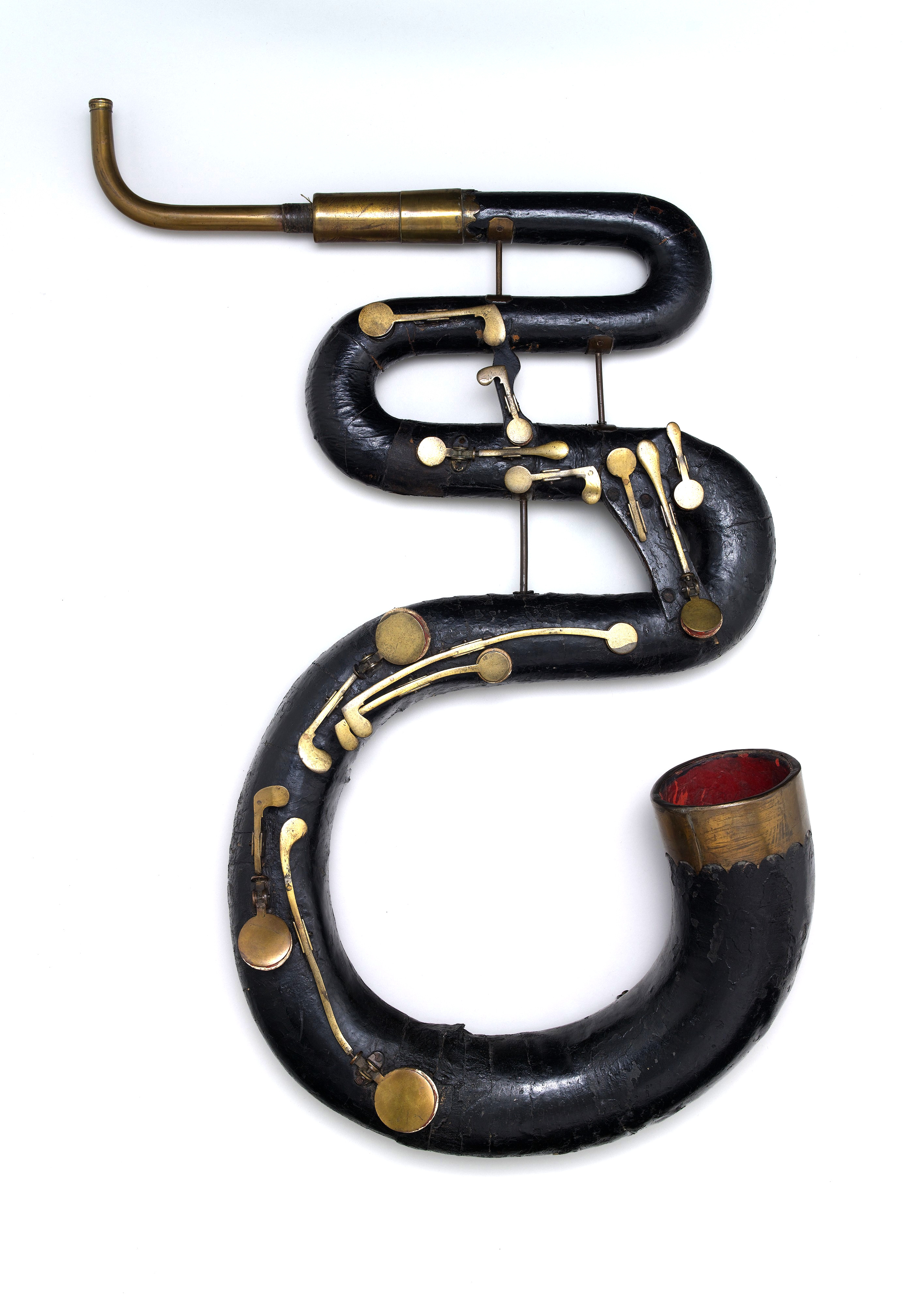
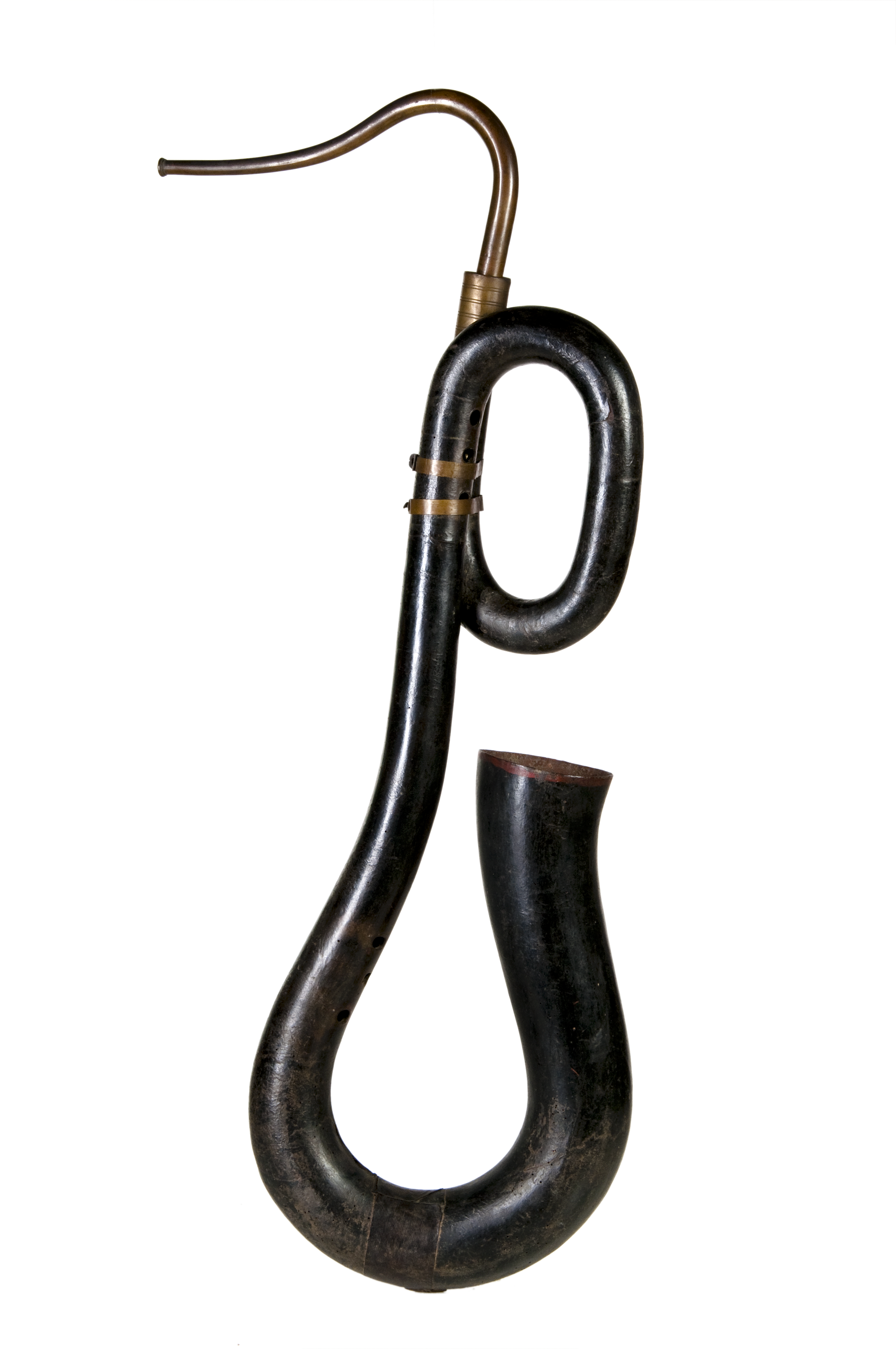
From left to right: traditional serpent in the original serpent d'église shape, late 18th century (Civic Museum of Modena, Italy); English military serpent, c. 1840 (Metropolitan Museum of Art, New York); French serpent militaire or Piffault serpent (Scenkonstmuseet, Stockholm)

Towards the end of the 18th century, the increased popularity of the serpent in military bands drove the subsequent development of the instrument to accommodate marching or mounted players. In England, a distinct military serpent was developed which had a more compact shape with tighter curves, added extra keys to improve its intonation, and metal braces between the bends to increase its rigidity and durability. In France around the same time several makers produced a serpent militaire initially developed by Piffault (by whose name they are also known) that arranges the tubing vertically with an upward turned bell, reminiscent of a tenor saxophone.

=== Upright serpents and bass horns ===
Types of upright serpents and bass horns
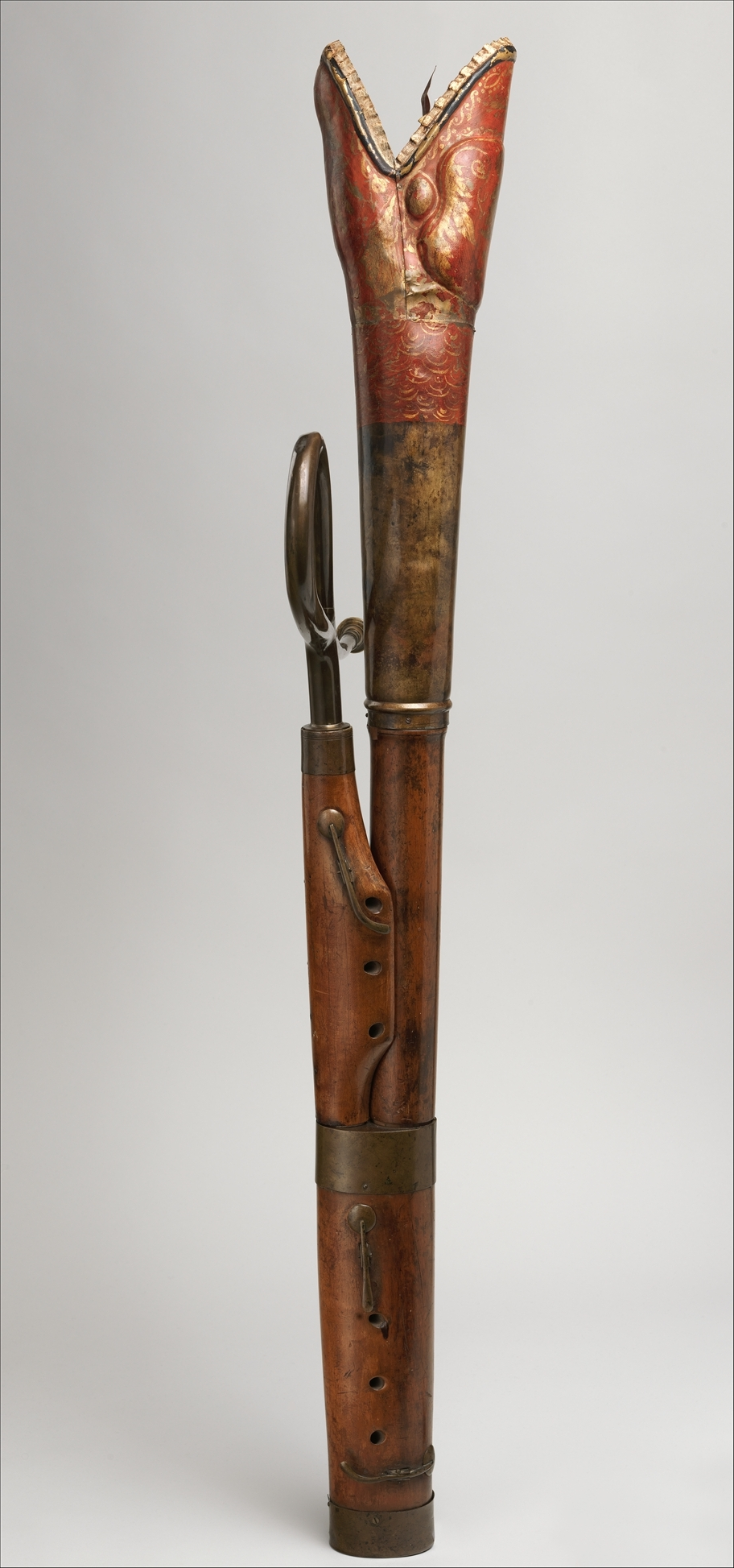
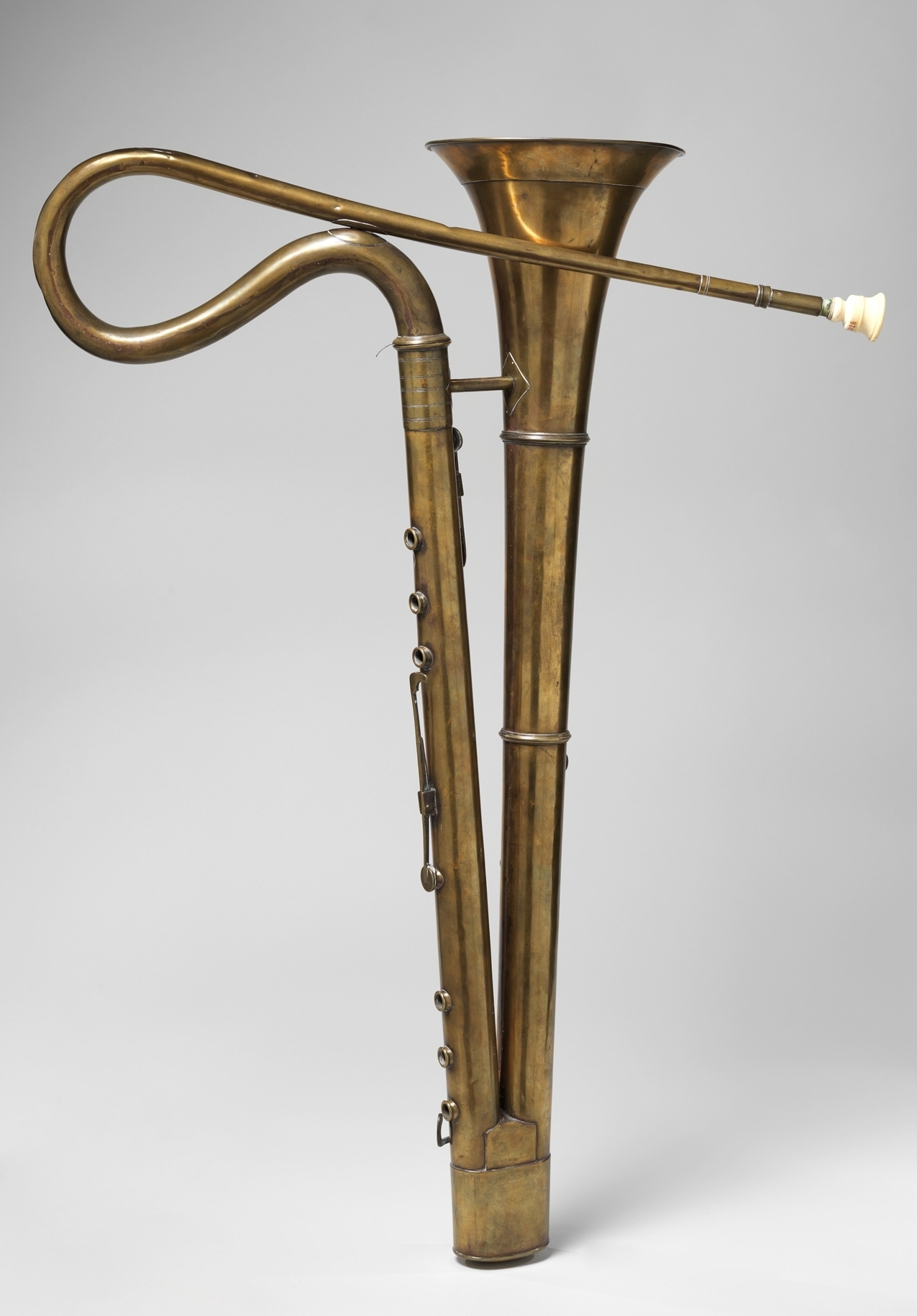
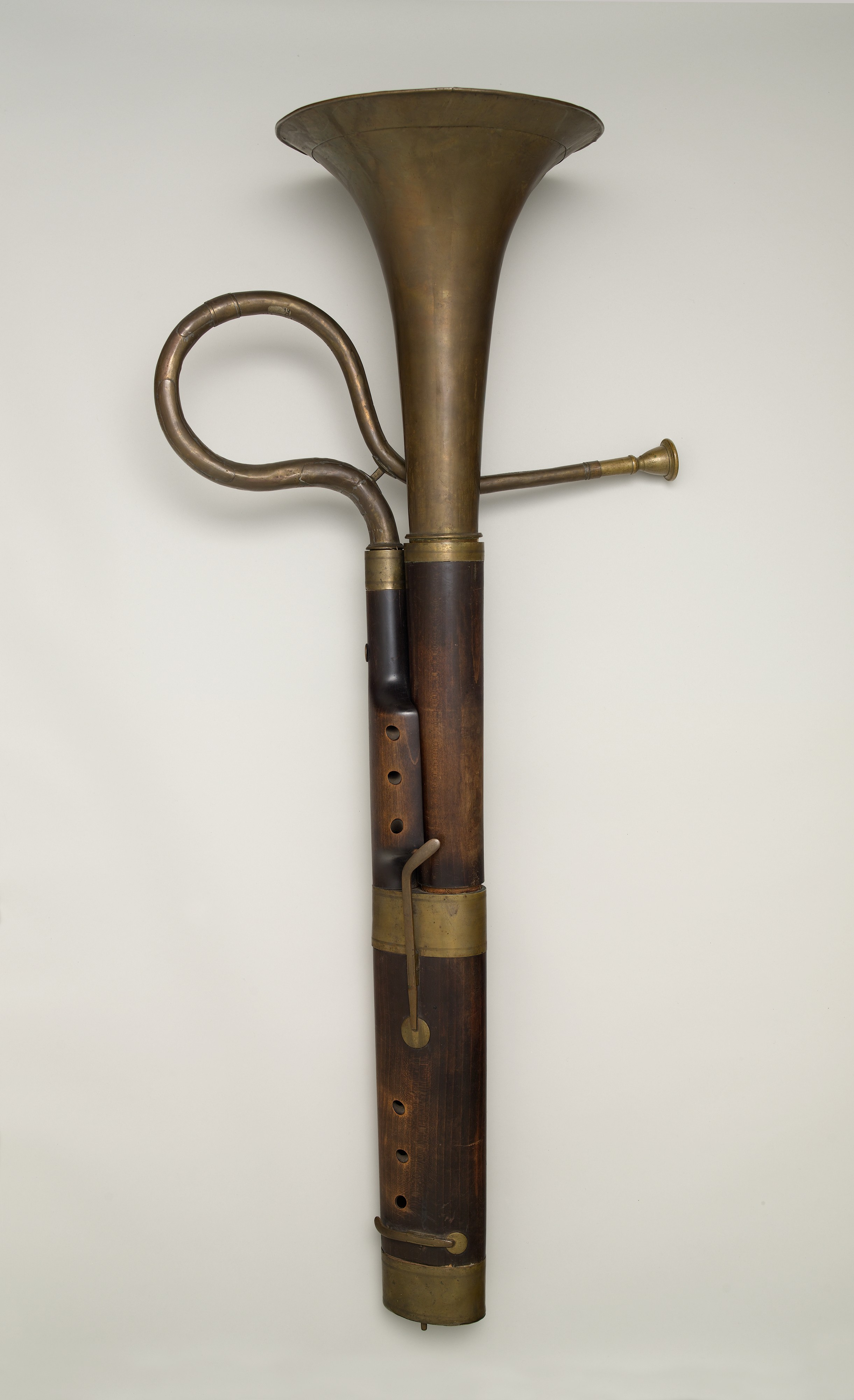
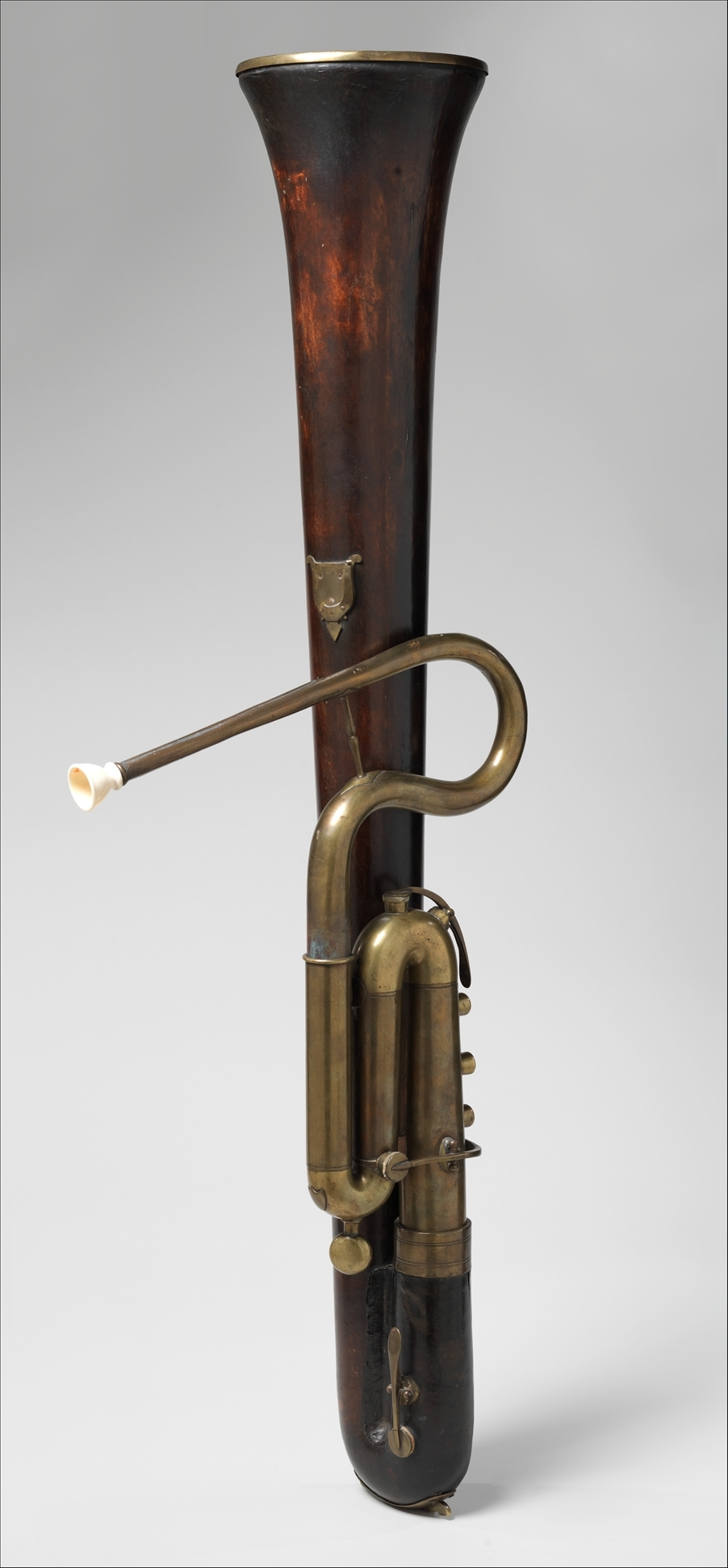
Top left: basson russe, c. 1825–40; right: English bass horn, c. 1835; bottom, left: cimbasso, early 19th century; right: Serpent Forveille, c. 1825 (Metropolitan Museum of Art, New York)

Several vertical configurations of the serpent, generally known as upright serpents (French: serpent droit) or bass horns, were developed from the late 18th century. Retaining the same six tone holes and fingering of the original serpent, these instruments resemble the bassoon, with jointed straight tubes that fit into a short U-shaped butt joint, and an upward-pointing bell.

==== Basson russe ====
Among the first of the upright serpents to appear around the turn of the 19th century was the basson russe, lit. 'Russian bassoon', although it was neither Russian nor a bassoon. The name is possibly a corruption of basson prusse since they were taken up by the Prussian army bands of the time. Many of these instruments were built in Lyon and often had the buccin-style decorative zoomorphic bells popular in France at the time, shaped and painted like a dragon or serpent head. Appearing around the same time in military bands was the serpent à pavillon (lit. 'bell serpent') which had a normal brass instrument bell, similar in flare to the later ophicleide.

==== English bass horn ====
The English bass horn, developed by London-based French musician and inventor Louis Alexandre Frichot in 1799, had an all-metal V-shaped construction, described by German composer Felix Mendelssohn as resembling a watering can. He admired its sound however, and wrote for the instrument in several of his works, including the overture to A Midsummer Night's Dream (1826) and his fifth "Reformation" symphony (1830), although when the Overture was first published, the part was changed to ophicleide for unknown reasons. The bass horn was popular in civic and military bands in Britain and Ireland, and also spread back into orchestras in Europe, where it influenced the inventors of both the ophicleide and later the Baß-Tuba.

==== Early cimbasso ====
The serpent appears as serpentone in early 19th century Italian operatic scores by composers such as Spontini, Rossini, and Bellini. In Italy it was replaced by the cimbasso, a loose term that referred to several instruments; initially an upright serpent similar to the basson russe, then the ophicleide, early forms of valved tuba (pelittone, bombardone), and finally by the time of Verdi's opera Otello (1887), a valve contrabass trombone.

==== Other upright serpents ====
In Paris in 1823, Forveille invented the serpent Forveille, an upright serpent with an enlarged bell section influenced by the (then newly invented) ophicleide. It is distinguished by being made from wood, brass tubing being used only for the leadpipe and first bend. It became popular in bands for its improved intonation and sound quality. In 1828 Jean-Baptiste Coëffet patented his ophimonocleide ("snake with one key"), one of the last forms of the upright serpent. It solved a perennial problem of the serpent, its difficult and indistinct B♮ notes. The instrument is built a semitone lower in B♮ and adds a large open tone hole that keeps the instrument in C until its key is pressed, closing the tone hole and producing a clear and resonant B♮. The instrument also has a unique pompe, a double tuning slide that (combined with adjusting the bocal) could change the pitch by up to a major second and allow the player to switch between the different pitch standards of the time (diapason de l'opéra and diapason de la cathédrale).

=== Contemporary revival ===
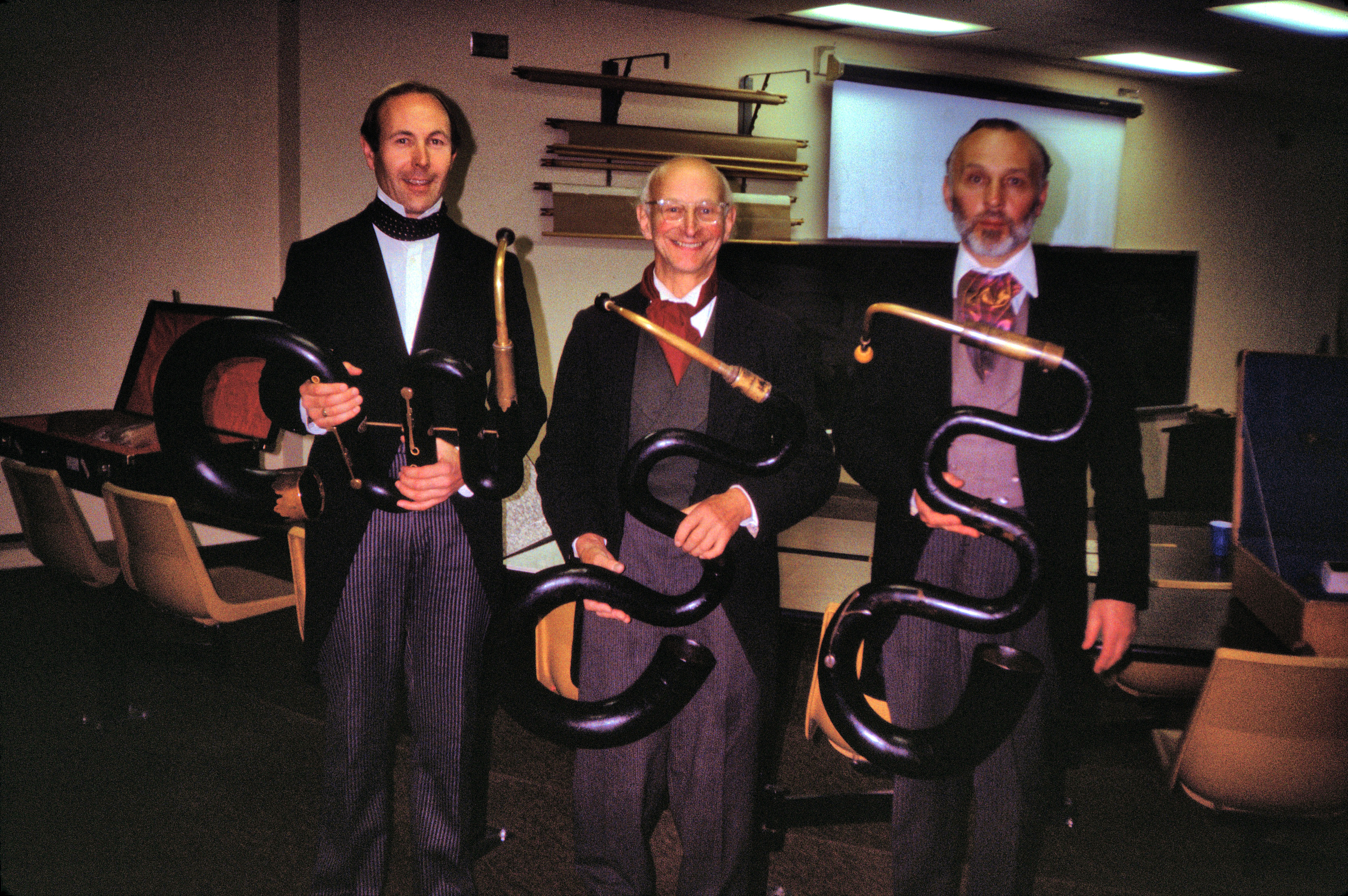
The London Serpent Trio, 1989: Andrew van der Beek (left), Christopher Monk (center), Alan Lumsden (right)

The era of upright serpents was brief, spanning the first half of the 19th century from their invention to their replacement by the ophicleide and subsequent valved brass instruments. German opera composer Richard Wagner, by the 1869 première of his Der Ring des Nibelungen cycle, was writing his lowest brass parts for tuba and contrabass trombone. Consequently, the serpent had all but disappeared from ensembles by 1900.

The serpent has enjoyed a modern revival of interest and manufacture since the mid-20th century. Christopher Monk began building his own replica cornetts and serpents and playing them in historically informed performances. In 1968 he and instrument maker Keith Rogers devised a method of constructing cornetts inexpensively from a composite wood-resin material, which helped to raise interest in these instruments and increase their availability. In 1976 he established the London Serpent Trio with English Early Music Consort players Andrew van der Beek and Alan Lumsden, performing new works and historical arrangements, both serious and whimsical, throughout Europe and North America. At the same time in France, historical instrument specialist Bernard Fourtet and jazz musician Michel Godard began promoting use of the serpent, and reintroduced serpent teaching at the Conservatoire de Paris. Among the graduates are Volny Hostiou, who has recorded a significant serpent discography, and Patrick Wibart, also an accomplished ophicleide player. Wibart succeeded Godard as the serpent teacher at the Conservatoire de Paris, and also teaches serpent at the Conservatoire de Versailles Grand Parc.

The Serpent Newsletter, first published in 1986 as the Newsletter for United Serpents, is published twice a year and edited by Paul Schmidt. It reviews new recordings and publications, covers contemporary performances and events, as well as new discoveries, appearances in media and film, and other developments.

== Range and performance ==
Range of the serpent; notes below C₂ are obtained with the embouchure

The serpent's range typically covers the two and a half octaves from C_{2} two octaves below middle C to G_{4}. The range can easily extend downwards to A_{1} or even F_{1} by fingering the low C note with all holes covered, and producing falset tones, by slackening the embouchure ("lipping down"). Proficient players can play upwards to C_{5}.

Monk writes that due to its inherent mechanical and acoustical defects, the serpent is one of the more difficult wind instruments to play well. Although played with an embouchure similar to that used with other brass instruments such as the trombone, the instrument is easily over-blown so the player must use a more gentle air stream. The tone holes do not always serve to shorten the air column as they do in woodwind instruments. The lower tone holes in particular are too small and behave more like air leaks, working largely by dampening resonances in the air column, thus altering the note selection and influencing the timbre. Consequently, the player must rely much more on a strong, controlled embouchure to produce the correct pitch than on other brass instruments. The serpent's natural tones with all holes covered (the harmonic series on C_{2}) are fuller and richer than those produced with fingering, so the player must also focus on consistency of timbre and a cantabile approach throughout the serpent's range.

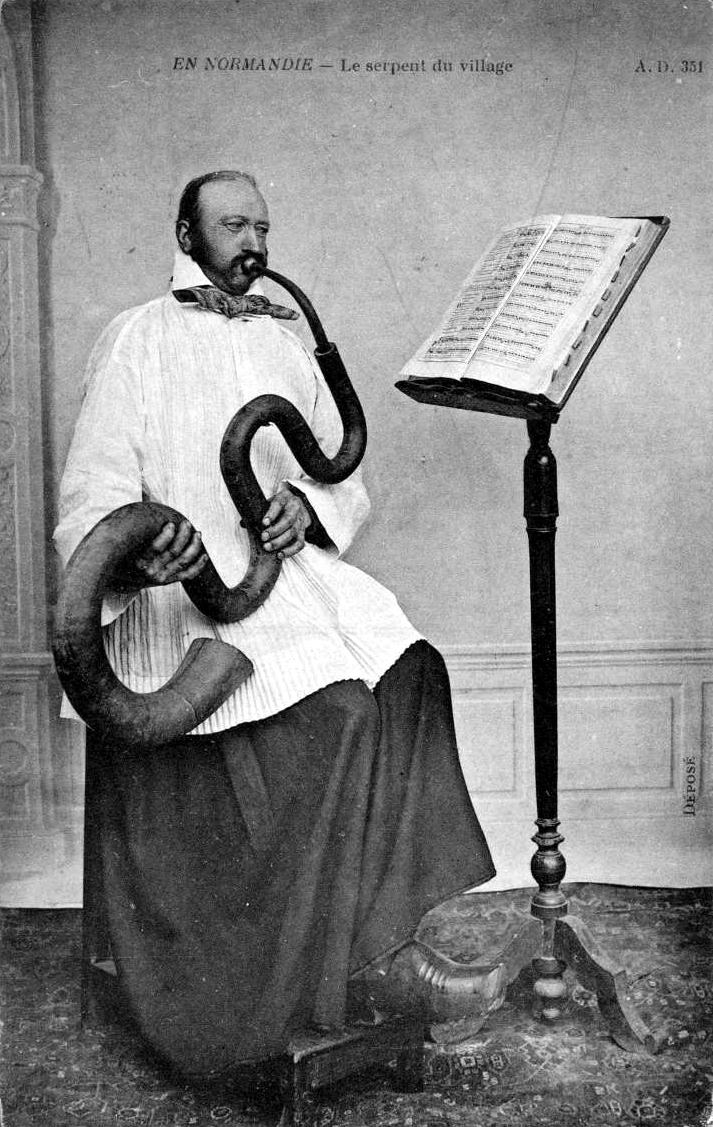
Serpentist holding the instrument horizontally, with reversed right-hand fingering

The serpent was originally played vertically, with each hand covering one of the two sets of tone holes from above. In 1772 Abbé Lunel, serpentist at Notre-Dame de Paris, devised a way to hold the serpent horizontally, a method subsequently used in military bands. Holding the serpent this way involves supporting the lower curve with the right hand under, rather than over, the lower three tone holes, thus reversing the order of the fingering.

Production of pitch can be lowered by a semitone or more by slackening the embouchure given the same fingering. This is due to the serpent's coupling of a "strong" acoustical system of embouchure and mouthpiece, with the relatively "weak" system of the air column in the serpent body. This results in the mouthpiece having a stronger influence on selecting the instrument pitch than the air column. The mismatch of embouchure and air column length also contributes to its timbre.

== Repertoire ==
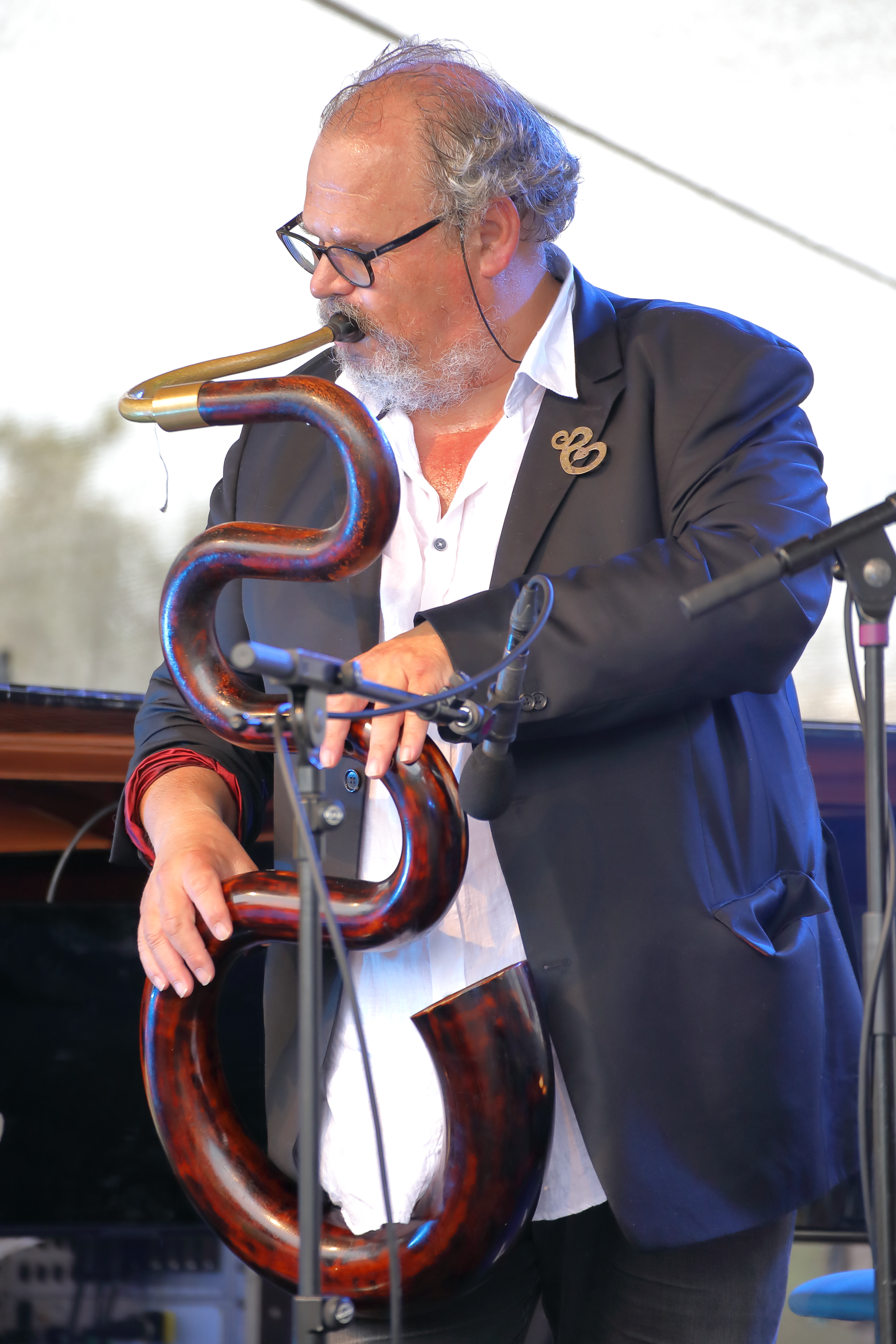
Michel Godard performs on a serpent in the Adrabesa Quartet, 2020. Note, Godard is using the vertical hold.

Serpents were originally used as an instrument to accompany church choral music, particularly in France. For this purpose, very little was specifically written for the serpent per se; the serpent player would simply play the cantus firmus, or bass line. The serpent began to be called for in orchestras by opera composers in the mid-to-late 18th century, and their subsequent adoption in military bands prompted the publication of several method books, fingering charts and etudes, including duets for student and teacher.

Among the serpent's first appearances in orchestral scores is George Frideric Handel's Music for the Royal Fireworks (1749), although he later removed it. Italian composers in the early 19th century often called for serpentone, in operas by Gioachino Rossini and Vincenzo Bellini. Mendelssohn paired serpent with contrabassoon in his overture Calm Sea and Prosperous Voyage (1828) and fifth "Reformation" symphony (1830), and Hector Berlioz included serpent and ophicleide in his early revisions of Symphonie fantastique (1830).

After disappearing almost entirely by the late 19th century, the serpent began to reappear in the mid-20th century in film scores and new period instrument chamber ensembles. American film composer Bernard Herrmann used a serpent in the scores of White Witch Doctor (1953) and Journey to the Center of the Earth (1959), as did Jerry Goldsmith in his score for Alien (1979).

French tubist and serpent specialist at Paris Conservatoire Michel Godard often uses serpent in jazz and contemporary music, and has frequently collaborated with Lebanese composer and oud player Rabih Abou-Khalil.

Modern works for the instrument include a concerto for serpent and orchestra by English composer Simon Proctor, commissioned in 1987 to mark the first International Serpent Festival in South Carolina, where it was premièred by London Serpent Trio member Alan Lumsden in 1989. Also premièred at the festival was composer Peter Schickele's comic P.D.Q. Bach piece O Serpent, written for the London Serpent Trio and vocal ensemble. Douglas Yeo premièred Temptation for serpent and string quartet, written by his Boston Symphony Orchestra colleague, trombonist and composer Norman Bolter, at the 1999 International Trombone Festival in Potsdam, New York. In 2008, Yeo also premièred Old Dances in New Shoes, a serpent concerto by American composer Gordon W. Bowie. Italian composer Luigi Morleo wrote Diversità: NO LIMIT, a concerto for serpent and strings, which premièred in Monopoli, Italy in 2012.

American composer Austin Wintory's Grammy-nominated and BAFTA-winning soundtrack for the 2012 PlayStation 3 video game Journey includes a serpent as one of the five soloists, played by California trombonist Noah Gladstone.

After publishing a guide to playing techniques of the serpent in April 2024, which includes advice for composers on fingering and extended techniques, British tubist and Lund University scholar Jack Adler-McKean commissioned and recorded four new contemporary works for serpent in February 2025.

== Players ==
- Clifford Bevan, London Serpent Trio, musicologist
- Bernard Fourtet, French early music specialist
- Michel Godard, Conservatoire de Paris; jazz musician, tubist, serpent player
- Volny Hostiou, scholar and serpent specialist
- Phil Humphries, London Serpent Trio, New London Consort, The Mellstock Band
- Andrew Kershaw, London Serpent Trio, Orchestra of the Age of Enlightenment
- Alan Lumsden, London Serpent Trio, Early Music Consort
- Nick Perry, London Serpent Trio, serpent builder for Christopher Monk Instruments
- Andrew van der Beek, London Serpent Trio, Early Music Consort
- Patrick Wibart, Conservatoire de Paris, Conservatoire de Versailles Grand Parc; serpent and ophicleide specialist
- Steve Wick, tubist, professor of Serpent at Royal Academy of Music, London Serpent Trio
- Douglas Yeo, Boston Symphony Orchestra (retired), bass trombonist, serpent and ophicleide player

== In popular culture ==
- Serpents have appeared on cinema and television screens, usually in scenes with on-screen musicians playing period or fantasy diegetic music, as early as The Scarlet Pimpernel (1934) and as recently as The Hobbit: The Desolation of Smaug (2013).
- The prop used for the titular horn in the 1956 British film The Case of the Mukkinese Battle-Horn was based on a serpent.
- Serpents appear in the music video for the 2000 single "Frontier Psychiatrist" by Australian group The Avalanches.
