= Pasadena Roof Orchestra =

The Pasadena Roof Orchestra
- Also known as: PRO
- Origin: London, England
- Genres: Jazz, ragtime, blues, swing and (to a lesser extent) big band
- Years active: 1969–present
- Labels: Currently Pasadena Records, originally Transatlantic
- Website: www.pasadena-ro.com

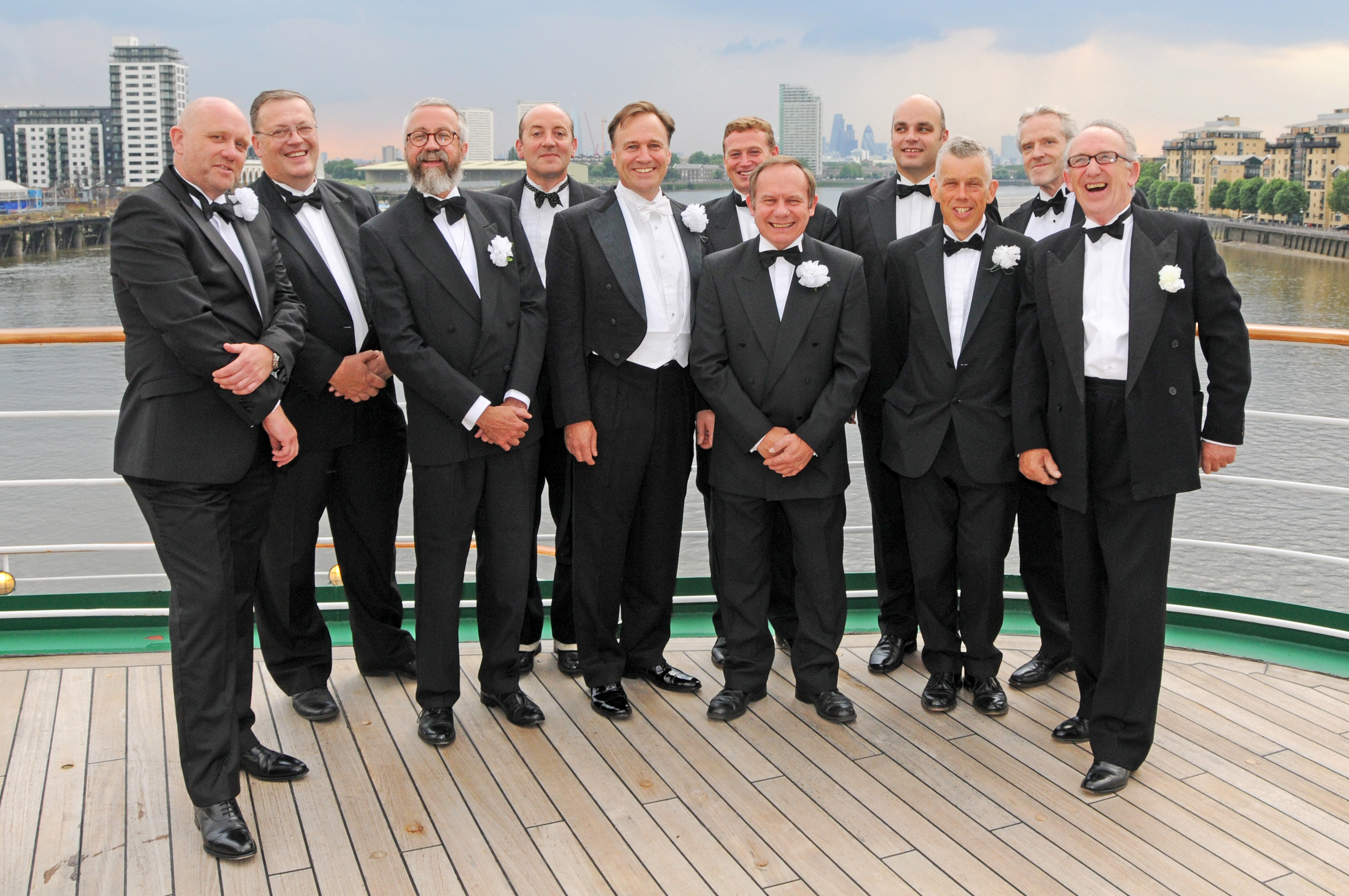
Pasadena Roof Orchestra 2014

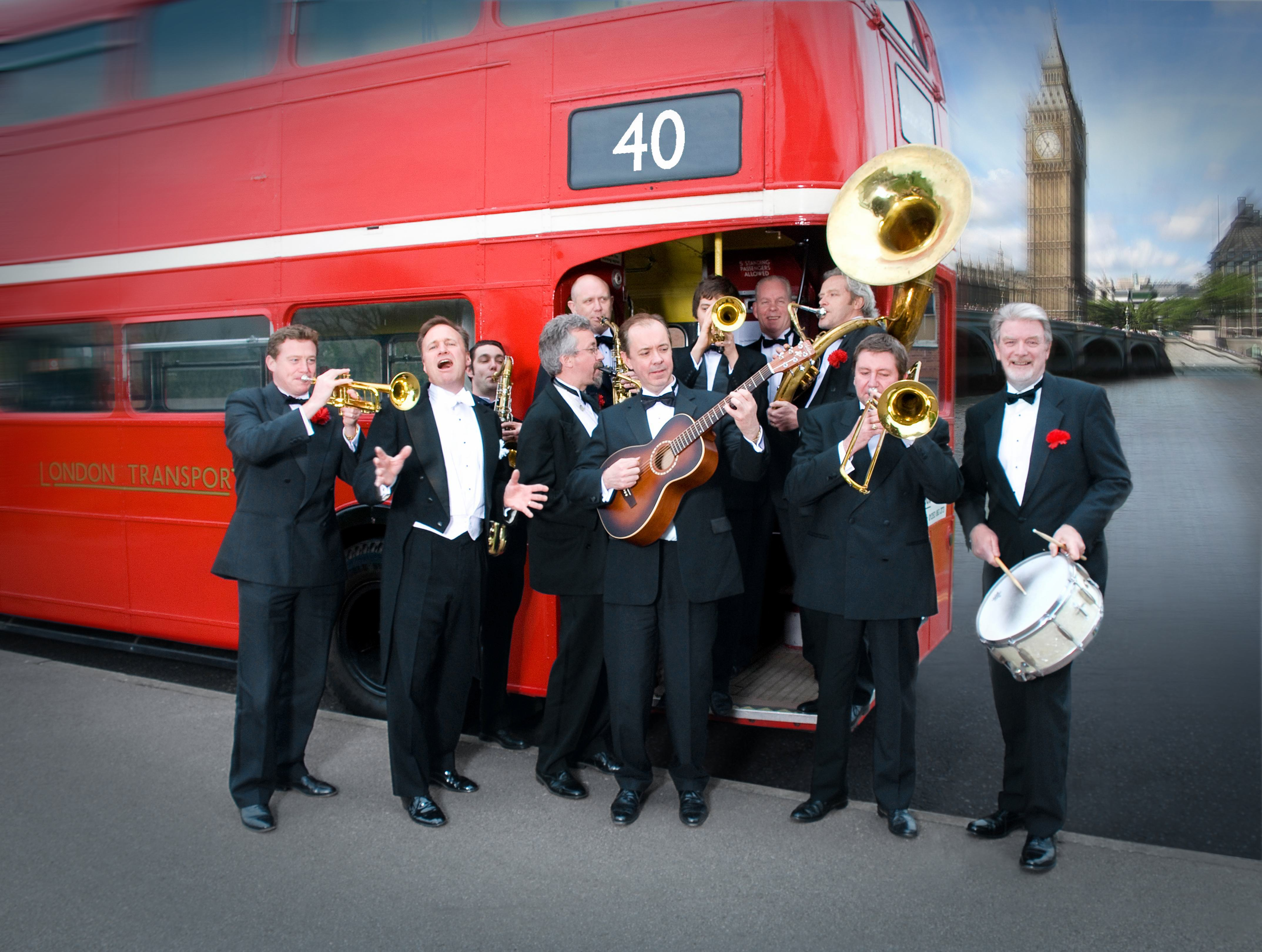

The Pasadena Roof Orchestra (PRO) is a contemporary band from England that specialises in the jazz and swing genres of music of the 1920s and 1930s, although their full repertoire is considerably wider. The orchestra has existed since 1969, although the line-up has frequently changed. It has achieved success outside the United Kingdom, most notably in Germany.

== Brief history ==
The Pasadena Roof Orchestra was so named in November 1969 by John Arthy, a baker who played the double bass and sousaphone, and who had taken over the Creole Dance Orchestra (first formed in 1965) in which he played bass and sousaphone, from Chris Macdonald, its founder. Arthy purchased a cache of original musical arrangements dating from the 1920s stored in the attic of a lady in Manchester, and the strength of this find reinvigorated the flagging fortunes of the earlier band. The new name of the band was inspired by Harry Warren's "Home in Pasadena". There had been a strong revival movement for music of the 1920s in the late 1950s and early 1960s (known as the Trad movement – bands included The Temperance Seven); however, Arthy continued to move this band in a different direction to most of the revivalists, away from humour and towards more serious, dedicated renditions of the music.

The orchestra's first vocalist was John "Pazz" Parry, an old friend of Arthy's (the two had both been members of the Creole Dance Orchestra from 1965). With the injection of the new arrangements, Arthy as bandleader, also performing on the double bass and sousaphone, the PRO soon grew in popularity.

The orchestra became professional in 1975. Their first LP for Transatlantic was recorded in August 1974 and released in December of that year, premiering at the Midem music fair in Cannes in 1975. The orchestra followed this by touring West Germany (where the revival movement was very popular) in the Autumn of that year.

The orchestra toured the United States in 1993 and 2001 (their 25th Anniversary album cover featured a photo of the band in front of the Santa Fe train station in Pasadena, California).

They have worked with musicians including Robbie Williams (in 2005) and Bryan Ferry (in 2000).

Although John Arthy retired in 1997, the band continues to tour extensively and record with bandleader and singer Duncan Galloway. In 2009, the orchestra toured Great Britain and Germany.

== Orchestra members ==
Many jazz musicians have on occasion performed with the Orchestra, though below is a timeline of regular members.

== Discography ==
=== The Pasadena Roof Orchestra ===
==== Vinyl ====
- The Pasadena Roof Orchestra (Transatlantic, 1974)
- Good News (Transatlantic, 1975)
- On Tour (Transatlantic 1976; live album recorded in Germany)
- Isn't It Romantic (Transatlantic, 1976)
- The Show Must Go On (Transatlantic, 1977)
- A Talking Picture (Transatlantic, 1978)
- Anthology (Transatlantic, 1978)
- Night Out (CBS, 1979)
- Crazy Words, Crazy Tunes (Aves Records & Tapes, 1982)
- Fifteen Years On (Metronome, 1984)

==== CDs ====
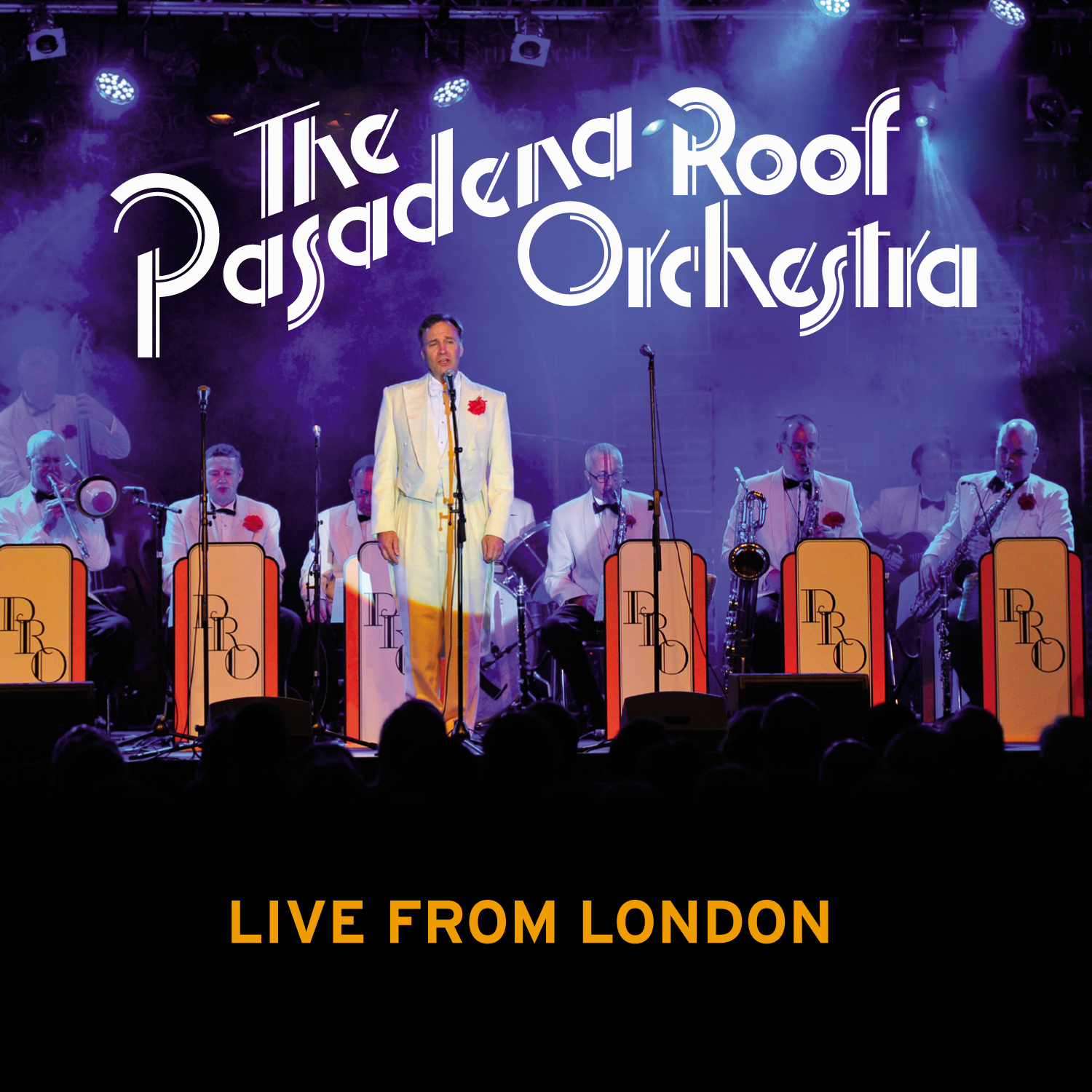

- Happy Feet (Pasadena Records, 1987; CD PRO 1)
- ...Steppin' Out (Pasadena Records, 1989; CD PRO 2; live album recorded in England)
- 42nd Street (Ditto, 1990; twin cassettes)
- Breakaway (Pasadena Records, 1991; CD PRO 3)
- The Collection (Castle Music UK; 1992)
- 25th Anniversary Album (Pasadena Records, 1993; CD PRO 4)
- Rhythm is our Business (Pasadena Records, 1996; CD PRO 5)
- The Best of the Pasadena Roof Orchestra: Lullaby of Broadway (Castle/Pulse, 1997)
- Home in Pasadena: Very Best of the Pasadena Roof Orchestra (Castle/Pulse, 1998)
- Swing That Music! (Pasadena Records, 1998; CD PRO 6)
- 30th Anniversary (Pasadena Records, 2001)
- Here & Now (Pasadena Records, 2002; CD PRO 7)
- Roots of Swing (Pasadena Records, 2008; CD PRO 8)
- Licensed To Swing (2011; CD PRO 9)
- The Christmas Album (2011; CD PRO 10)
- Ladies and Gentlemen (2013; Herzog Records) - features Laura Fygi on two tracks and Les Brünettes on two tracks
- Live from London (2016; Herzog Records)
- The Jubilee Collection (2018; Herzog Records) - 3 CD set - re-releases of The Show Must Go On (1977), On Tour (1976) and Ladies and Gentlemen (2013)
- Back on the Road (2021; Herzog Records)

==== Singles ====
- Pennies from Heaven/Back in Your Own Backyard (1978; 7" single)
- Paddlin' Madelin' Home/Nagasaki (Island; 7" single)
- Me and Jane in a Plane/Pasadena (Transatlantic; 7" single)
- Looney Tunes/Nobody's Sweetheart (Reward Records; 7" single)

=== The Pasadena Roof Orchestra and The Swing Sisters ===
- Take Me Back (Emporio 627, 1993)
- Sentimental Journey (MCI, 1993)

== DVD releases ==
In 2003 the Pasadena Roof Orchestra released a DVD of the 30th Anniversary live concert at Regent's Park, London, with guests. This DVD is only available in Region 2 format.

This DVD is the first release to feature a double sided DVD which plays in colour and digital stereo on one side and in sepia-toned monochrome, with Phonograph style mono audio, on the other.

In August 2005 another DVD, Dance the Night Away appeared, but only in Region 1 format. This DVD was not sanctioned by the orchestra and was recorded from a 1979 German TV show.

== Appearances ==
- The PRO has worked on the soundtracks of several films, including Just a Gigolo (1979) and Comedian Harmonists (1997).
- On 1 October 1975, the PRO appeared on the first episode of the second season of Twiggy, a BBC2 variety show hosted by the model Twiggy, with whom they performed Everything Stops for Tea.
- In 1992, the orchestra appeared in two six-part BBC Radio 2 half-hour comedy series entitled The Pasadenas' Almanac. The premise was that the orchestra played themselves, despite the series being set in the 1930s. Each series would feature the band travelling the world and foiling the plans of villains and evil masterminds, always finding the time to play some music too. Duncan Galloway took the fore, supported by traditional British radio actors and comedians such as June Whitfield and Roy Hudd.

== See also ==
- The Temperance Seven
- Max Raabe & Palast Orchester
