= Christopher Monk =

English early music specialist and instrument maker

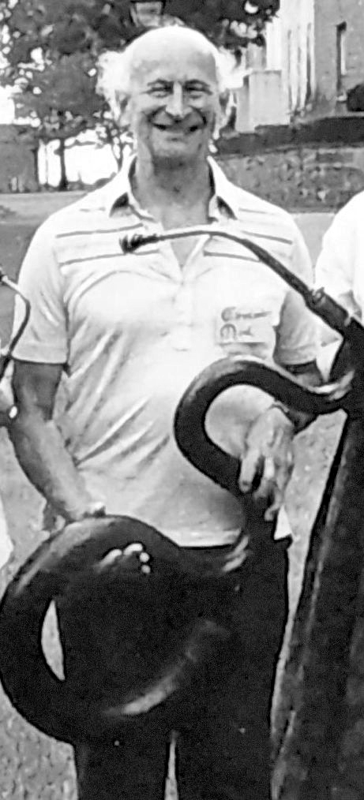
Christopher monk with a serpent, 1986

Christopher Monk (28 December 1921 – 17 July 1991) was an English musicologist, early music specialist, performer, and musical instrument maker. He was prominent in the mid-20th century revival of interest in Renaissance period wind instruments, particularly the cornett and serpent, and was involved in the historically informed performance movement.

== Education ==
Monk graduated in history from the University of Oxford, and studied trumpet under George Eskdale.

== Career ==
While teaching in schools he constructed his first cornett in 1955, and went on to pioneer building replicas and performing on them. He mastered the virtuoso cornett parts of Italian Renaissance composer Claudio Monteverdi's choral work, the Vespers of 1610, which were regarded at the time as impossible to play.

In the 1960s he became interested in the serpent, its shape appealing to his sense of humour. In 1967, he formed the London Serpent Trio, with English players Andrew van der Beek and Alan Lumsden, performing new works and historical arrangements, both serious and whimsical, throughout Europe and North America. In 1968 he devised a method of making cornetts out of a wood-resin composite material, which was considerably cheaper than carving them from wooden pieces and bonding them with leather. Thousands were made in this way, which helped to increase the interest and availability of the instruments. He set up Christopher Monk Instruments where he and instrument maker Keith Rodgers continued to manufacture cornetts, and serpents from walnut wood and leather. After his death in 1991, the workshop passed to his long-time collaborator and friend, English cornettist Jeremy West.

In 1995 the Historic Brass Society created The Christopher Monk Award in his honour, to recognize people "who have made significant and life-long contributions to study and/or performance in the field of brass history".
