= Lawrence Wolfe =

American football and basketball coach

Coaching career (HC unless noted)

Football
- 1926–1927: Linfield
- 1928–1934: Oregon Normal

Basketball
- 1926–1928: Linfield
- 1928–1935: Oregon Normal

Head coaching record
- Overall: 49–20–6 (football)

Lawrence Wolfe was an American college football and college basketball coach. He served as the head coach in both sports at Linfield College and Oregon Normal School—known as Western Oregon University. Wolfe was the head football coach at Linfield from 1926 to 1927, compiling a record of 8–7–2. He was head football coach Oregon Norma from 1928 to 1934, tallying a mark of 41–13–4.

Wolfe is credited with inspiring the Oregon Normal's "Wolf" mascot.

== Head coaching record ==
=== Football ===
Year	Team	Overall	Conference	Standing	Bowl/playoffs
Linfield Wildcats (Independent) (1926–1927)
1926	Linfield	5–2–1			
1927	Linfield	3–5–1			
Linfield:		8–7–2			
Oregon Normal Wolves (Independent) (1928–1934)
1928	Oregon Normal	5–3			
1929	Oregon Normal	5–2–2			
1930	Oregon Normal	6–1			
1931	Oregon Normal	6–2–1			
1932	Oregon Normal	7–1			
1933	Oregon Normal	5–2			
1934	Oregon Normal	7–2–1			
Oregon Normal:		41–13–4			
Total:		49–20–6			
