= You're Driving Me Crazy =

1930 American popular song

Song

"You're Driving Me Crazy"
Recorded by Rudy Vallée & His Connecticut Yankees in 1930

Original 1930 sheet music for "You're Driving Me Crazy"

"You’re Driving Me Crazy" (Note: Copyrighted as "You're Driving Me Crazy! What Did I Do?" and renewed under R203385) is an American popular song composed (music and lyrics) by Walter Donaldson in 1930 and recorded the same year by Lee Morse, Rudy Vallée & His Connecticut Yankees and Guy Lombardo & His Royal Canadians (with vocal by Carmen Lombardo). The composition entered the public domain on January 1, 2026.

== Successful recordings ==
The song became a hit and was added to the 1930 musical comedy Smiles, starring Marilyn Miller and Fred and Adele Astaire. It was recorded in 1930 by McKinney's Cotton Pickers and by Nick Lucas & His Crooning Troubadors. Nick Lucas's version, released on Brunswick, was a No. 7 hit: Brunswick 4987 (E-35404). Other popular artists issuing recording of this hit that same year included Rudy Vallée, Gene Austin and Guy Lombardo. The chords of "You're Driving Me Crazy" form the basis for Bennie Moten's great "Moten Swing."

In 1931, cartoon character Betty Boop sang a sexy version of the song in the pre-code cartoon Silly Scandals. As Boop sang the song, her dress slipped down repeatedly, revealing a lacy bra and causing her to squeal. Later in the song, Betty was joined on stage by a line of mechanical dancing penguins who stomped out the beat in accompaniment to her singing.

"You're Driving Me Crazy" has become a standard that has been recorded by over 100 artists. The artists who have recorded the song include Louis Armstrong, Chet Baker, Betty Carter, Ella Fitzgerald, Billie Holiday, Peggy Lee, Della Reese, Django Reinhardt, Dinah Shore, Frank Sinatra, Mel Tormé, Sarah Vaughan, and Lester Young. A version by The Temperance Seven made number one in the UK Singles chart in 1961.

The song has also been performed in motion pictures including:

- Your'e Driving Me Crazy (misplaced apostrophe in the original screen title), a Fleischer Studios 1931 cartoon in the Screen Songs series, with jazzy scat singing of "You're Driving Me Crazy" by various animals. There is a dancing lion, monkeys and other animals, including a Cab Calloway sound-alike. It features singer Harriet Lee in a "follow the bouncing ball" sing along segment.
- The 1931 Paramount Betty Boop cartoon Silly Scandals noted above.
- The 1991 film The Marrying Man starring Kim Basinger and Alec Baldwin. "You're Driving Me Crazy" is performed by Alan Paul from The Manhattan Transfer.
- The 2005 Oscar-nominated film Good Night, and Good Luck. "You're Driving Me Crazy" and other standards performed by Dianne Reeves.
- The 2001 soccer/prison movie Mean Machine. "You're Driving Me Crazy" is performed by Bob Brozman on the soundtrack.

== The Temperance Seven cover version ==
A cover version by The Temperance Seven, described as an art school band "who were retro before most of pop was even original," was produced by George Martin. It was recorded in 1961, reaching number 1 on the UK Singles Chart that May. Their version is a pastiche on the original, and on 1920s dance band music in general, with Paul McDowell's insincere "whispering" helping to highlight this. Music critic Tom Ewing, writing for Freaky Trigger, concurrently described it as "one of the strangest number ones," "one of the most prescient [number ones]" and "the first meta-pop hit", citing the song's "deliberate, tongue-in-cheek commentary on pop via pop, the world of the dance orchestras pushed flippantly into the TV age," feeling this anticipated Roxy Music and Richard X, but also feeling as many people would have bought the single based on nostalgia as those who bought it due to its cleverness.

== Notable recorded versions ==
- Lorez Alexandria
- Steve Allen
- Gene Ammons
- Ray Anthony
- Louis Armstrong
- Gene Austin
- Chet Baker
- Josephine Baker
- Betty Bennett
- Ruby Braff
- Les Brown
- Bob Brozman
- Sonny Burke
- Max Bygraves
- Barbara Carroll
- Betty Carter
- The Catalinas
- Charlie & His Orchestra
- Nat King Cole
- Ken Colyer
- Eddie Condon
- Bob Crosby
- Bing Crosby (for his 1957 album New Tricks.)
- Doris Day
- Joey Dee and the Starliters
- Vic Dickenson
- Tommy Dorsey
- Billy Eckstine
- Kurt Edelhagen
- Les Elgart
- Anita Ellis
- Seger Ellis
- Bill Evans
- Al Fairweather
- Georgie Fame
- Gracie Fields
- Ella Fitzgerald
- Erroll Garner
- Jackie Gleason
- Benny Goodman
- Stéphane Grappelli
- Buddy Greco (1953)
- Lionel Hampton
- Dick Haymes
- Jeff Healey
- Ted Heath
- Fletcher Henderson
- Earl Hines
- Art Hodes
- Johnny Hodges
- Billie Holiday
- Hoosier Hot Shots
- Claude Hopkins
- Helen Humes
- Dick Hyman
- Etta Jones
- Clifford Jordan
- Ben E. King
- Lee Konitz
- Abbe Lane
- Peggy Lee
- Guy Lombardo
- Nick Lucas
- Humphrey Lyttelton
- Billy May
- Les McCann
- Jack McDuff
- The McGuire Sisters
- Dave McKenna
- McKinney's Cotton Pickers
- Jay McShann
- George Melly
- Glenn Miller
- Mistinguett
- Joe Morello
- Jaye P. Morgan
- Lee Morse
- Joe Pass
- Tony Pastor
- Bob and Alf Pearson
- Art Pepper
- Perez Prado
- Professor Longhair
- Quintet of the Hot Club of France
- Sonny Red
- Don Redman & His Orchestra (1939)
- Della Reese
- Dianne Reeves
- Django Reinhardt (21 April 1937)
- Line Renaud (1965) (in French)
- Nelson Riddle
- Tito Rodriguez
- Jimmy Rowles
- Jane Russell
- George Shearing
- Lennington Shewell
- Dinah Shore
- Zoot Sims
- Frank Sinatra
- Keely Smith
- Valaida Snow
- Jeri Southern
- Muggsy Spanier
- Squirrel Nut Zippers (1995)
- Jess Stacy
- Kay Starr
- Curtis Stigers
- Maxine Sullivan
- Art Tatum
- The Temperance Seven (1961)
- Mel Tormé
- Big Joe Turner
- Rudy Vallée
- Sarah Vaughan
- Fred Waring
- Teddy Wilson
- Phil Woods
- Lester Young
