= The Alberts =

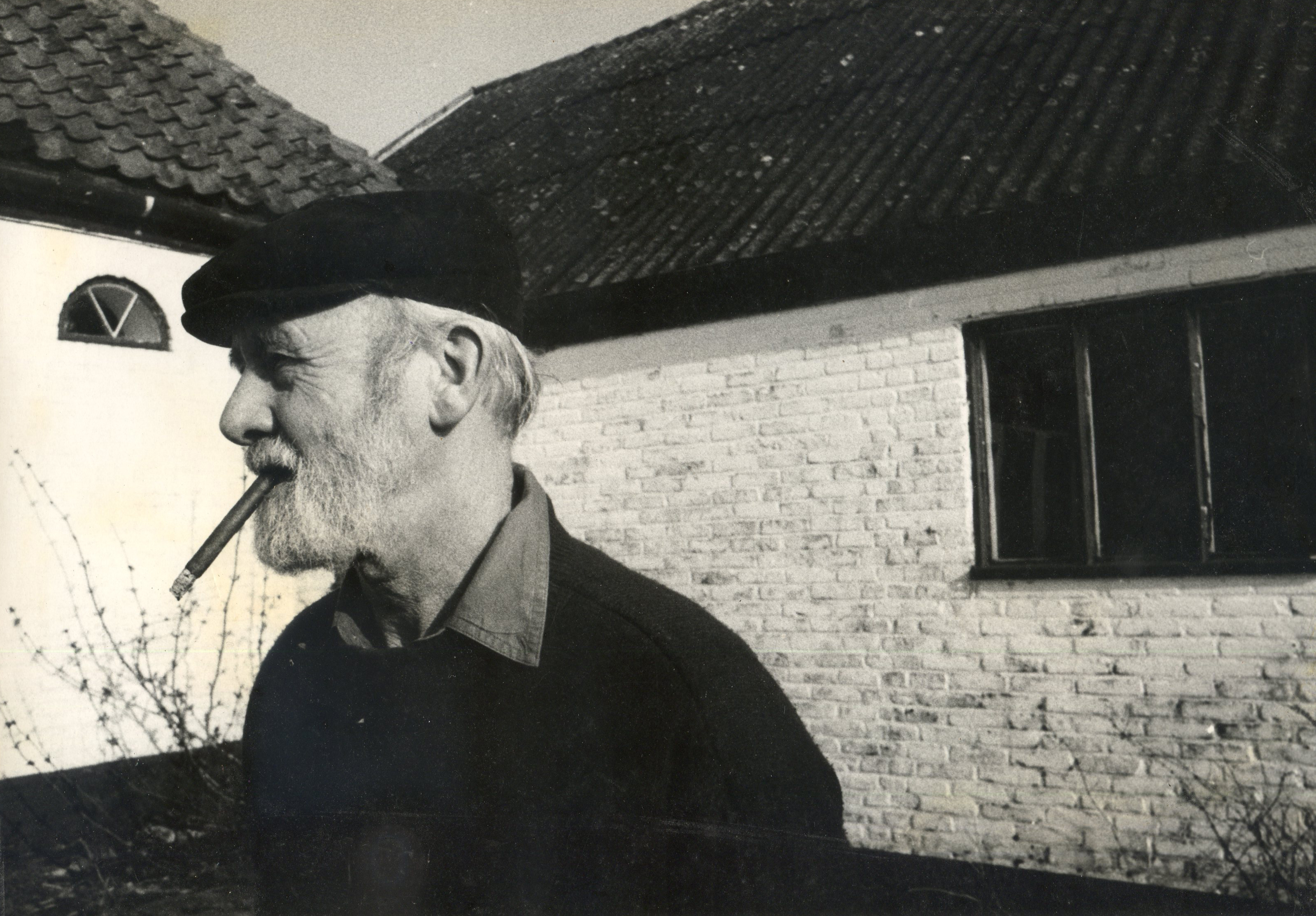
Tony smoking a cigar

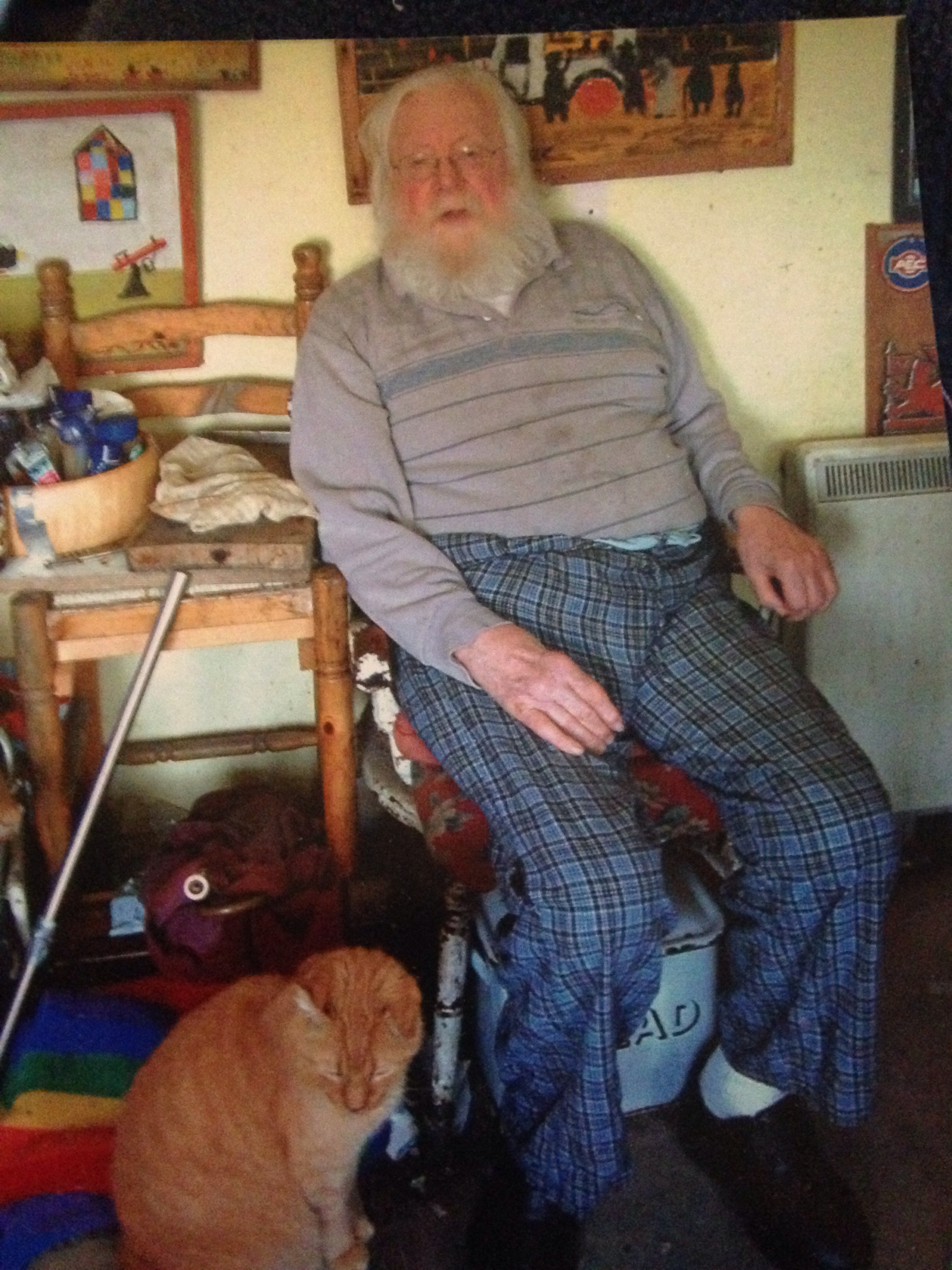
Douglas Gray at home with his cat 2013.

The Alberts were a British music/comedy troupe of the mid-1950s to mid-1960s, featuring brothers Anthony "Tony" and Douglas "Dougie" Gray, along with Bruce Lacey. They were notable for their surreal performances.

== Career ==
Educated at the Oratory School (Kensington), they were evacuated during World War II to Penzance. They left school after the war and performed their National Service in Egypt. They appeared on several of Spike Milligan's television series. They intended to inaugurate the fledgling BBC2 on 20 April 1964, but a power failure delayed the launch until the following day. For almost the entire year of 1963, beginning January 1963, in the West End, The Alberts, along with Joyce Grant, Ivor Cutler, Michael Codron and William Donaldson, presented An Evening of British Rubbish, which Princess Margaret attended twice, and which was released on an LP record by George Martin, head of Parlophone at the time. Several members of The Bonzo Dog Doo Dah Band have publicly said they were hugely influenced by The Alberts.

The Gray brothers appeared in several films directed by Ken Russell, including Dante's Inferno and The Music Lovers. They toured the world with the Royal Opera house with non-singing roles in Benjamin Britten's Peter Grimes and released a single in May 1962, produced by George Martin at Abbey Road, called "Morse Code Melody", with "Sleepy Valley" on the flip side. Another single, "Goodbye Dolly (Gray)" / "Blaze Away" and credited to The Massed Alberts, an expanded version of the group again featuring Bruce Lacey, was also released on Parlophone in July 1964 but similarly failed to chart.

The Alberts (including Lacey) adapted Alexandre Dumas père's novel, The Three Musketeers Ride Again!, at the Royal Court Theatre, with Rachel Roberts, Valentine Dyall, Colin Phillips, Alexei Jawdokimov and Jill Bruce in the cast, directed by Eleanor Fazan.

Anthony "Tony" Gray (22 December 1927 – 14 April 2014) died at age 86 in the UK. He was twice married and had five children.

Douglas Gray (28 September 1930 - 18 June 2020) died aged 89 in Norfolk. He had two children, Pandora and Gideon, a musician. In later, life Gray turned up for the service at his local church every Sunday dressed as a Cossack.

== Discography ==
- The Alberts, The Bonzo Dog Doo Dah Band, The Temperance Seven, singles compilation album, 1971
- By Jingo It's British Rubbish (1998 CD: HUX 015), singles compilation
