= Cornology =

Box set by The Bonzo Dog Band
- Released: 13 July 1992
- Recorded: 1966–1971
- Genre: Comedy rock
- Label: EMI (UK)

Professional ratings
Review scores
Source	Rating
Allmusic	4.5/5 stars

Cornology is a 1992 compilation box set, issued by EMI Records, of the complete recorded output of The Bonzo Dog Band, previously issued on the Parlophone, Liberty and United Artists labels.

The three CDs each have subtitles. Volume One is titled The Intro and contains the albums Gorilla and The Doughnut in Granny's Greenhouse. Volume Two is subtitled The Outro and contains the albums Tadpoles and Keynsham. Volume Three is titled Dog Ends and contains their final original album Let's Make Up and Be Friendly along with early Bonzo Dog singles, odds and ends and solo material.

In 2011, it was superseded by the Parlophone collection A Dog's Life: The Albums 1967–1972, which contains the same material, with the non-album tracks placed after Let's Make Up instead of around it.

== Track listing ==
All tracks by Neil Innes and/or Vivian Stanshall except where noted:

=== Disc one – The Intro (DADA is normal--normal is nice) ===
Tracks 1–15 from the album Gorilla. Tracks 16–27 from the album The Doughnut In Granny's Greenhouse

1. "Cool Britannia" (Traditional) – 1:00
2. "The Equestrian Statue" – 2:44
3. "Jollity Farm" (Leslie Sarony) – 2:28
4. "I Left My Heart in San Francisco" (George Cory, Douglass Cross) – 1:04
5. "Look Out, There's A Monster Coming" – 2:54
6. "Jazz, Delicious Hot, Disgusting Cold" (Ash, Vernon Dudley Bohay-Nowell, Innes, Rodney Slater, Legs Larry Smith, Roger Ruskin Spear, Stanshall) – 3:10
7. "Death Cab for Cutie" – 2:56
8. "Narcissus" (Ethelbert Nevin) – 0:23
9. "The Intro and The Outro" – 3:03
10. "Mickey's Son and Daughter" (Tommie Connor, Edward Lisbona) – 2:43
11. "Big Shot" – 3:29
12. "Music for the Head Ballet" – 1:45
13. "Piggy Bank Love" – 3:03
14. "I'm Bored" – 3:07
15. "The Sound of Music" (Oscar Hammerstein II, Richard Rodgers) – 1:23
16. "We Are Normal" – 4:50
17. "Postcard" – 4:22
18. "Beautiful Zelda" – 2:27
19. "Can Blue Men Sing the Whites" – 2:47
20. "Hello Mabel" – 2:46
21. "Karma Sutra" – 0:39
22. "Humanoid Boogie" – 3:04
23. "Trouser Press" – 2:20
24. "My Pink Half of the Drainpipe" – 3:33
25. "Rockaliser Baby" – 3:29
26. "Rhinocratic Oaths" – 3:21
27. "11 Mustachioed Daughters" – 3:49

=== Disc two – The Outro (The noises of your bodies are a part of this CD) ===
Tracks 1–11 from the album Tadpoles. Tracks 12–25 from the album Keynsham.

1. "Hunting Tigers Out In INDIAH" (Robert Hargreaves, Stanley Damerell, Tolchard Evans) – 3:06
2. "Shirt" (Spear) – 4:27
3. "Tubas In The Moonlight" (Spear) – 2:22
4. "Dr. Jazz" (Herman Darewski, King Oliver, Walter Melrose) – 2:40
5. "Monster Mash" (Leonard Capizzi, Bobby Pickett) – 2:59
6. "I'm the Urban Spaceman" (Innes) – 2:23
7. "Ali-Baba's Camel" (Noel Gay) – 3:31
8. "Laughing Blues" (Bradley) – 3:44
9. "By a Waterfall" (Fain Kahal) – 3:08
10. "Mr Apollo" – 4:20
11. "Canyons of Your Mind" – 3:03
12. "You Done My Brain In" – 1:41
13. "Keynsham" – 2:22
14. "Quiet Talks and Summer Walks" – 3:37
15. "Tent" – 3:06
16. "We Were Wrong" – 2:32
17. "Joke Shop Man" – 1:23
18. "The Bride Stripped Bare By 'Bachelors'" – 2:39
19. "Look at Me, I'm Wonderful" – 1:46
20. "What Do You Do?" – 3:12
21. "Mr. Slater's Parrot" – 2:27
22. "Sport (The Odd Boy)" – 3:30
23. "I Want to Be With You" – 2:16
24. "Noises For the Leg" – 1:54
25. "'Busted'" – 5:47

=== Disc three – Dog Ends (Mothers with children please note: this CD is inedible!) ===
Tracks 7–17 from the album Let's Make Up and Be Friendly

1. "My Brother Makes the Noises for the Talkies" (Charles Amberg, Fred Raymond, Luigi Bernauer) – 3:02
2. "I'm Going to Bring a Watermelon to My Girl Tonight" (Billy Rose, Con Conrad) – 2:03
3. "Alley Oop" (Dallas Frazier) – 2:32
4. "Button Up Your Overcoat" (Lew Brown, Buddy DeSylva, Ray Henderson) – 2:53
5. "Mr. Apollo" – 4:13 (German Single Version)
6. "Ready Mades" – 3:08
7. "The Strain" – 3:23
8. "Turkeys" – 2:10
9. "King of Scurf" – 5:00
10. "Waiting for the Wardrobe" (Spear) – 2:47
11. "Straight From My Heart" – 3:06
12. "Rusty (Champion Thrust)" (Tony Kaye, Legs Larry Smith) – 7:05
13. "Rawlinson End" – 9:07
14. "Don't Get Me Wrong" – 4:53
15. "Fresh Wound" – 4:26
16. "Bad Blood" – 5:32
17. "Slush" – 2:20
18. "Labio-Dental Fricative" – 3:08 (Performed by Vivian Stanshall Sean Head Showband)
19. "Re-Cycled Vinyl Blues" – 3:32 (Performed by Neil Innes)
20. "Trouser Freak" (Spear) – 2:18 (Performed by Roger Ruskin Spear & His Giant Orchestral Wardrobe)

== Technical personnel ==
- Gerry Bron – producer
- Gus Dudgeon – producer
- Neil Innes – arranger, producer
- "Legs" Larry Smith – producer
- Vivian Stanshall – arranger, producer
- Apollo C. Vermouth – producer
- Tony Kaye – producer
- Brian Hogg – liner notes
- Barry Sheffield – assistant, advisor
