= Sir Henry at Rawlinson End =

Sir Henry at Rawlinson End may refer to:

- Sir Henry at Rawlinson End (album), 1978
- Sir Henry at Rawlinson End (film), 1980

== See also ==
- Rawlinson End, radio broadcasts
