= Teddy Boys Don't Knit =

Studio album by Vivian Stanshall
- Released: 1981
- Recorded: April 1981
- Studio: Morgan Studios, Willesden Green, London
- Genre: Rock, comedy music
- Length: 51:51
- Label: Charisma (CB 1153)
- Producer: Malcolm Brown, Andrew Sheehan

Vivian Stanshall chronology
Sir Henry at Rawlinson End (1978)	Teddy Boys Don't Knit (1981)	Sir Henry at N'didi’s Kraal (1984)

Professional ratings
Review scores
Source	Rating
Allmusic	3.5/5 stars

Teddy Boys Don't Knit is the third solo album by Vivian Stanshall. As with his 1974 debut solo album Men Opening Umbrellas Ahead, it consists entirely of songs, rather than the comedy-narrative-with-integral-songs of its immediate predecessor Sir Henry at Rawlinson End.

== Background ==
Teddy Boys Don't Knit was written during Stanshall’s residence at his Thames river houseboat Searchlight with his second wife Ki Longfellow, his stepdaughter Sydney and his infant daughter Silky – a period which Longfellow has described as Stanshall’s "first, real and only taste of family life." Consequently, several songs on the album have domestic themes: "The Tube" (written for and about Silky Stanshall and her infant digestive process), "Bewilderbeeste" and "Calypso to Colapso" (for and about his love of Ki), "Fresh Faced Boys" (dealing with Stanshall’s struggle against his own father’s wishes for him to be well-groomed, well-behaved and socially presentable) and "Possibly an Armchair", in which Stanshall muses on ageing and on whether in old age he is likely to become the same kind of person as his elderly father had himself become.

The album was recorded at Morgan Studios, Willesden Green, in 1981 and released in between Stanshall's two spoken-word comedy albums, Sir Henry at Rawlinson End and Sir Henry at N'didi's Kraal (and shortly after the shooting of the film version of Sir Henry at Rawlinson End). Although not part of the Rawlinson End sequence in itself, Teddy Boys Don't Knit does feature several songs written (and in some cases used) for the project: "Gums", "The Cracks Are Showing" and "Terry Keeps His Clips On" (a song inspired by Terry clips). Several other songs emphasise Stanshall's love of language and language games. The title of "Flung a Dummy" is taken from an unusual phrase which Stanshall had heard a stranger on a train use as a euphemism for dying, while "Ginger Geezer" is written almost entirely in Cockney rhyming slang. Other songs parody and mock the lifestyle of the rock-and-roll musician.

As he had on Men Opening Umbrellas Ahead, Stanshall made use of the musical talents of his fellow former Bonzo Dog Band members Neil Innes and Roger Ruskin Spear, his frequently-called-on musical director Pete Moss and multi-instrumentalist Jim Cuomo. Other contributors to the album include Yes keyboard player Rick Wakeman, guitarist Ollie Halsall, Traffic/Can bass guitarist Rosko Gee, John Kirkpatrick on concertina, as well as Ki's friend and old Hampstead flatmate Richard Thompson.

The album title is derived from Stanshall's boyhood in the Thames Estuary town of Leigh-on-Sea, where he was a member of a Teddy Boy gang but baffled his fellow gang members with his chosen pastime of knitting.

== Track listing ==
Attitude 1

1. "King Kripple" - 2:52
2. "Slave Valse" - 4:38
3. "Gums" - 2:06
4. "Bewilderbeeste" - 2:57
5. "Calypso to Colapso" - 3:00
6. "The Tube" - 3:26
7. "Ginger Geezer" - 3:04
8. "The Cracks Are Showing" - 0:46
9. "Flung a Dummy" - 3:10

Bttitude 2

10. "Possibly an Armchair & Embodying Fresh Faced Boys" - 5:16
11. "Terry Keeps His Clips On" - 3:34
12. "Bass Macaw & Broken Bottles" - 2:55
13. "Nose Hymn" - 2:21
14. "Everyday, I Have the Blows" - 5:01
15. "Smoke Signals at Night" - 3:12
16. "Nouveau Riffe" - 3:33

== Personnel ==
=== Musicians ===
- Vivian Stanshall - vocals, horns, banjo, mandolin, kazoo, harp, piano, engineer, artwork
- Ollie Halsall, Richard Thompson - guitars
- Pete Moss - keyboards, bass, guitar, percussion, orchestration
- Rosko Gee - bass
- ”Admiral” John Halsey - drums
- Jim Cuomo - reeds, piano
- Neil Innes - piano
- John Kirkpatrick - concertina, melodeon
- Roger Ruskin Spear - xylophone and cornet on track 6, tenor saxophone on track 9
- Lennox Langton - steel drums on track 5
- Charmain Sheenhan - vocals on track 5
- Rick Wakeman - piano on track 15

=== Production ===
- Malcolm Brown - producer
- Andrew Sheehan - co-producer, percussion
- Martyn Webster - engineer
