= Eel Pie Publishing =

British music company

Eelpie
- Company type: Publishing, music production
- Industry: music
- Founded: 1970
- Founder: Pete Townshend
- Headquarters: Richmond, London, England
- Area served: Worldwide
- Key people: Pete Townshend
- Products: music studios, music publishing, music retail, book publishing, book retail
- Owner: Pete Townshend

Eel Pie Publishing was a publishing house founded by musician and author Pete Townshend in 1977, and named after Eel Pie Island. It was part of the Eelpie Group of Companies including Eel Pie Recording Production Ltd (renamed Honorable Ltd) which was set up in 1970 by Pete Townshend.

The principal activities of the group of companies were music studios, including Eel Pie Studios, recording and publishing. It used to have a website, but it is now closed.

Eel Pie Publishing Ltd itself was dissolved in September 2014, but other parts of the Eel Pie group established by Townshend remain.

== Published works ==
- In 1979 or 1980, Eel Pie published a version of Vivian Stanshall's Sir Henry at Rawlinson End, edited by his wife Ki Longfellow-Stanshall, with stills from the film of the same title.
- Carr, Roy; Murray, Charles Shaar (1981). Bowie: An Illustrated Record. New York / London: Avon / Eel Pie Publishing. ISBN 0-380-77966-8. OCLC 7862636.
