= Pour l'Amour des Chiens =

Studio album by The Bonzo Dog Doo-Dah Band
- Released: 12 December 2007
- Genre: Comedy rock
- Label: Storming
- Producer: Mickey Simmonds; Neil Innes

The Bonzo Dog Doo-Dah Band chronology
| Let's Make Up and Be Friendly (1972) | Pour l'Amour des Chiens (2007) |

Pour l'Amour Des Chiens (French: For the Love of Dogs) is the first all new studio album by the Bonzo Dog Doo-Dah Band in 35 years, and their sixth album overall. It was released on 12 December 2007, produced by Mickey Simmonds and Neil Innes, by Storming Music Company.

The album was performed by original group members Neil Innes, Roger Ruskin Spear, Rodney Slater, 'Legs' Larry Smith, Vernon Dudley Bowhay-Nowell, Martin 'Sam Spoons' Ash, and Bob Kerr, with New Millennium Bonzos Adrian Edmondson, Stephen Fry, and Phill Jupitus. Also credited are Mickey Simmonds (musical director), David Catlin-Birch (guitar and vocals), Johnny Marter (drums and percussion) and Steve Barnacle (bass and jazz guitar).

== Track listing — CD+DVD Edition ==
=== Disc 1 (CD) ===
1. "Pour l'Amour Des Chiens" (Innes)
2. "Let's All Go to Mary's House" (Arranged by The Bonzo Dog Doo-Dah Band)
3. "Hawkeye the Gnu" (Arranged by Slater, Innes)
4. "Making Faces at the Man in the Moon" (Rich, Smith, Hoffman)
5. "Fiasco" (Innes)
6. "Purple Sprouting Broccoli" (Ash)
7. "Old Tige" (Burke, Burke, Jim Reeves)
8. "Wire People" (Ash, Innes)
9. "Salmon Proust" (Innes)
10. "Democracy" (Innes)
11. "I Predict a Riot" (Hodgson, Wilson, Rix, Baines, White)
12. "Scarlet Ribbons" (Danzig, Segal)
13. "Paws" (Jupitus)
14. "And We're Back" (Innes)
15. "Stadium Love" (Innes, Heatherington, Fraser-Simpson, Milne)
16. "Mornington Crescent" (Simmonds)
17. "L'Essence d'Hooligan" (Innes)
18. "Early Morning Train" (Innes)
19. "My Friends Outside" (Spear)
20. "For the Benefit Of Mankind" (Innes)
21. "Beautiful People" (Edmondson)
22. "Ego Warriors" (Innes)
23. "Cockadoodle Tato" (Innes)
24. "Tiptoe Through the Tulips" (Burke, Dubin)
25. "Sweet Memories" (Smith)
26. "Sudoku Forecast" (Jupitus)
27. "Now You're Asleep" (Stanshall, Catlin-Birch)
28. "Jean Baudrillard" (Innes)

=== Disc 2 (DVD) ===
1. "My Brother Makes the Noises for the Talkies"
2. "Trouser Press"
3. "Les Deux Callapsos / The Monster Mash"
4. "Jollity Farm"
5. "The Canyons of Your Mind / The Equestrian Statue"
6. "The Urban Spaceman"

== Track listing — CD-only Edition ==
When compared to the CD from the above package, the CD-only edition omits "Scarlet Ribbons", "Mornington Crescent" and "Sweet Memories".

1. "Pour l'Amour Des Chiens" (Innes)
2. "Let's All Go to Mary's House" (Arranged by The Bonzo Dog Doo-Dah Band)
3. "Hawkeye the Gnu" (Arranged by Slater, Innes)
4. "Making Faces at the Man in the Moon" (Rich, Smith, Hoffman)
5. "Fiasco" (Innes)
6. "Purple Sprouting Broccoli" (Ash)
7. "Old Tige" (Burke, Burke, Reeves)
8. "Wire People" (Ash, Innes)
9. "Salmon Proust" (Innes)
10. "Democracy" (Innes)
11. "I Predict a Riot" (Hodgson, Wilson, Rix, Baines, White)
12. "Paws" (Jupitus)
13. "And We're Back" (Innes)
14. "Stadium Love" (Innes, Heatherington, Fraser-Simpson, Milne)
15. "L'Essence d'Hooligan" (Innes)
16. "Early Morning Train" (Innes)
17. "My Friends Outside" (Spear)
18. "For the Benefit Of Mankind" (Innes)
19. "Beautiful People" (Edmondson)
20. "Ego Warriors" (Innes)
21. "Cockadoodle Tato" (Innes)
22. "Tiptoe Through the Tulips" (Burke, Dubin)
23. "Sudoku Forecast" (Jupitus)
24. "Now You're Asleep" (Stanshall, Catlin-Birch)
25. "Jean Baudrillard" (Innes)

== Reception ==
The Times awarded the album four stars and described it as "rarely less than charming", while The Observer gave it three, calling it "predictable" and "only half amusing". Record Collector said, "Delicious idiocy through wordplay, Wire People, songs about dead dogs, Old Tige, neurotic gardening, Purple Sprouting Broccoli and a gloriously levelling cover of the Kaiser Chiefs "I Predict A Riot" – it’s all here. Tiptoeing through the innate silliness, it’s often easy to forget the quality of their playing, which, unlike some of the low-grade gags on offer, is faultless."

Describing the album in his 2009 book The Bonzo Dog Doo Dah Band - Jollity Farm, Bob Carruthers says of "I Predict a Riot": "Hard to predict the plot of this one, as Mr Spear and Mr Edmonson are let loose on this Kaiser Chiefs classic. Planned and unplanned studio incursions by Mexicans, Wurzels, that bloody chicken clarinet and HM constabulary."
