= Church of St Peter and St Paul, Langham =

Church in Langham, Rutland

Coordinates: 52°41′31″N 0°45′11″W

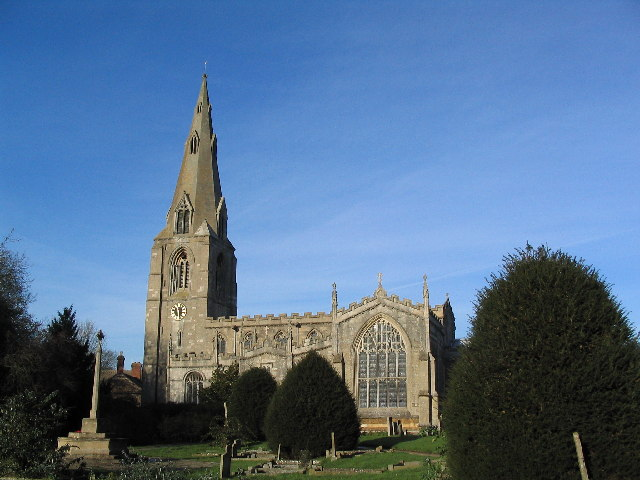
- Denomination: Church of England

History
- Dedication: St Peter, St Paul

Administration
- Diocese: Peterborough
- Parish: Langham, Rutland

Clergy
- Rector: Stephen Griffiths
- Vicar(s): Chris Rattenberry and Deborah Marsh

The Church of St Peter and St Paul is a church in Langham, Rutland. The Church of England parish church is a Grade I listed building.

== History ==
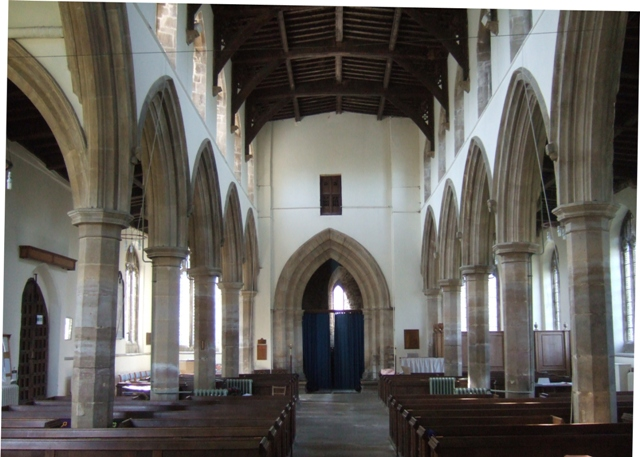
Interior of the church looking west to the tower arch

The church dates to the 13th century. The chancel arch and the arcades in the nave date to the 14th century and the aisles, transepts and clerestory were added in the 15th century. Above each column and around the walls are carvings which are thought to have been carved by some apprentice masons who did some work on Canterbury Cathedral.

Sir Henry Clarke-Jervoise is remembered in a stained glass window in the south transept by Ninian Comper, who was also responsible for the east window's glass. In the south transept is a marble slab remembering John Clarke and one of his wives.

To one side is a calligraphy scroll commemorating Simon Langham (1310 – 1376) who was born in the village. He was a monk at Westminster Abbey who became Archbishop of Canterbury and a cardinal.

The font dates from the 14th century. There is also a 16th-century oak chest. There are also some unusual elephant carvings on top of the vestry wall, carved to remember the Owen family who supported the church. The family were involved in the East India Company.

There is a plaque commemorating John Brocklehurst, 1st Baron Ranksborough.

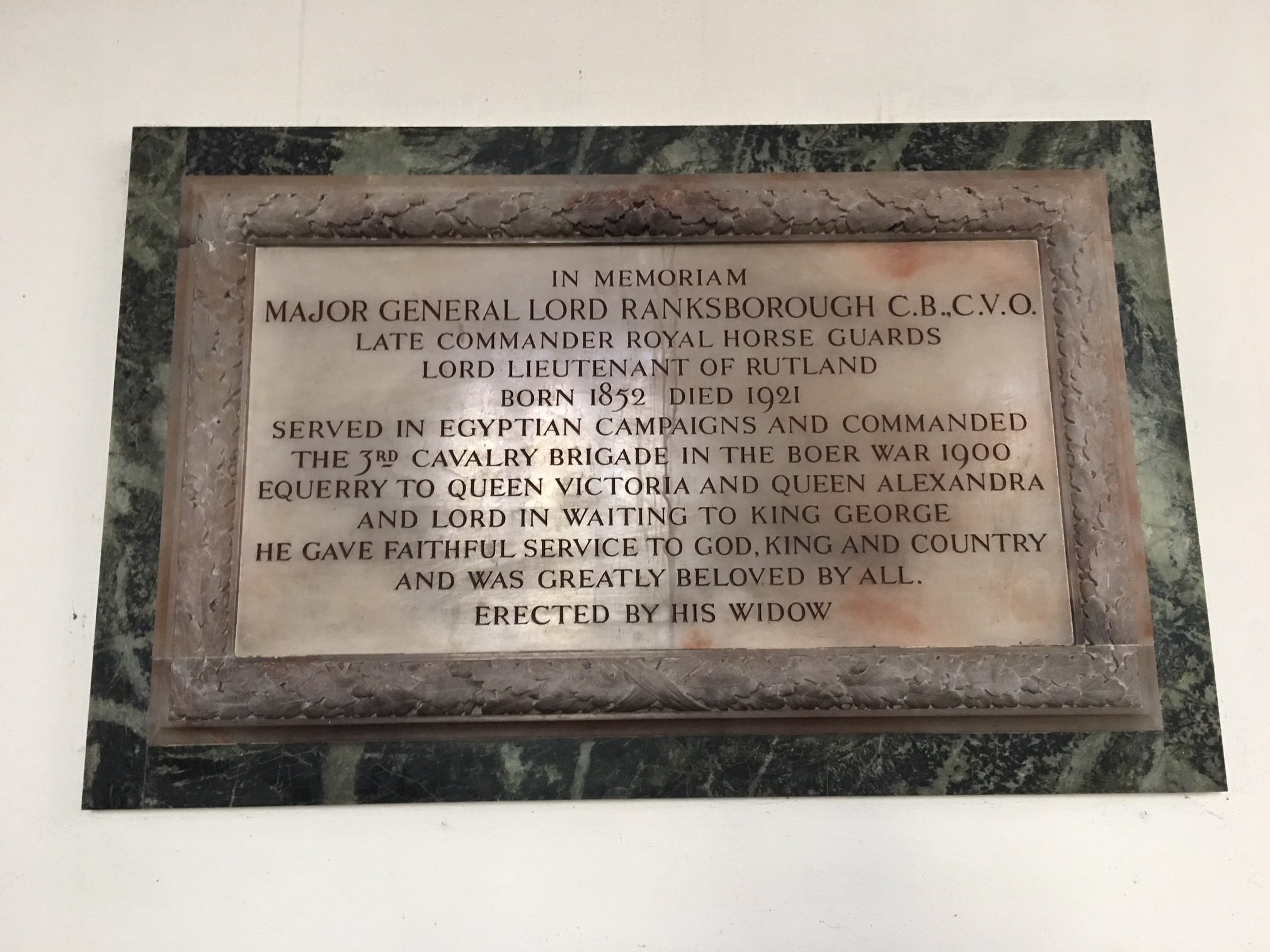
The plaque commemorating John Brocklehurst, 1st Baron Ranksborough

Outside, situated near the south door, is a stump of a cross. There is also a grave remembering Sir Kenneth Ruddle, a member of the Ruddles Brewery family.
