= Let's Make Up and Be Friendly =

Studio album by Bonzo Dog Band
- Released: March 1972
- Recorded: November 1971
- Studio: The Manor, Oxfordshire
- Genre: Comedy rock Psychedelic pop Avant-garde
- Length: 50:46
- Label: United Artists Records
- Producer: Neil Innes, Vivian Stanshall (except "Rusty (Champion Thrust)", produced by "Legs" Larry Smith & Tony Kaye)

Bonzo Dog Band chronology
Keynsham (1969)	Let's Make Up and Be Friendly (1972)	Pour l'Amour des Chiens (2007)

British reissue
- Sunset SLS 50418

Let's Make Up And Be Friendly is the fifth studio album by the Bonzo Dog Band and their last album until 2007. The group had already disbanded when United Artists Records (which absorbed the Bonzos' label Liberty Records) informed band members that the group owed the label one more album. This 1972 farewell album was the result, recorded at The Manor Studio in November 1971, while the building itself was still in the process of being converted to accommodate the recording studio that was being built.

This was The Bonzo Dog Band's last album of new material featuring all the original members until their reunion in 2006, by which time founder member Vivian Stanshall was deceased. A new studio album, Pour l'Amour des Chiens was released in December 2007. The album is today controlled by the Parlophone unit of Warner Music Group.

In 2007 the album was re-issued on CD by EMI with six bonus tracks, some of which were solo recordings by the members of the group.

== Songs ==
"The Strain", Stanshall's ode to lavatorial distress, was inspired by "Constipation Blues" by Screamin' Jay Hawkins, suitably filtered through Stanshall's own unique vision. Stanshall was a committed admirer of Hawkins, and had previously paid homage in similar fashion with "11 Moustachioed Daughters" (inspired by Hawkins' original 1963 recording of "Feast Of The Mau Mau") on The Bonzos' 1968 LP The Doughnut In Granny's Greenhouse.

"Rawlinson End", the longest track (at 9:07) on any Bonzos album, features the first official appearance of Vivian Stanshall's character Sir Henry Rawlinson, whose exploits would later be expanded as a series of BBC Radio 1 sessions for the John Peel show as Rawlinson End; a Sir Henry at Rawlinson End LP in 1978; and in 1984 a semi-sequel, Sir Henry at N'didi’s Kraal; a film, Sir Henry at Rawlinson End (1980), and accompanying book; and a final cameo appearance in a 1994 commercial for Ruddles Real Ale with Dawn French.

The finished album was originally issued in vinyl and in 8-track format.

There are a few differences between British and American versions:

- "Rusty"
  - UK: fades out at end
  - US: does not fade out and continues on past where UK's ends
- Track gaps
  - The UK album has a longer time gap between "Waiting for the Wardrobe" and "Straight from My Heart", and between "Bad Blood" and "Slush", than does the US one.

== Sleeve notes ==
...dada for now.

Together with the 1974 The History of the Bonzos, the cover artwork for Friendly features an image of the eponymous "Bonzo Dog".

== Track listing (LP) ==
Side 1
No.	Title	Writer(s)	Length
1.	"The Strain"	Vivian Stanshall	3:20
2.	"Turkeys"	Neil Innes	2:11
3.	"King of Scurf"	Innes	4:56
4.	"Waiting for the Wardrobe"	Roger Ruskin Spear	2:50
5.	"Straight from My Heart"	Innes, Stanshall	3:05
6.	"Rusty (Champion Thrust)"	Tony Kaye, Legs Larry Smith	8:07

Side 2
No.	Title	Writer(s)	Length
7.	"Rawlinson End"	Innes, Stanshall	9:31
8.	"Don't Get Me Wrong"	Stanshall, Innes	4:51
9.	"Fresh Wound"	Innes	4:25
10.	"Bad Blood"	Stanshall	5:10
11.	"Slush"	Innes	2:20

== Track listing (CD) ==
Bonus tracks on 2007 re-issue CD
No.	Title	Writer(s)	Length
12.	"Sofa Head"	Stanshall
13.	"Jam" (by Topo D Bil)	Tom E. Cross	3:12
14.	"I Love to Bumpity Bump" (by Roger Ruskin Spear)	Spear	2:36
15.	"Lie Down & Be Counted" (by Neil Innes)	Innes	3:10
16.	"Bride Stripped Bare By 'Bachelors'" (early version)	Innes, Stanshall	6:47
17.	"No Matter Who You Vote for the Government Always Gets In" (demo)	Innes, Stanshall	4:09

== Personnel ==
Personnel per liner notes.

=== Musicians ===
- Vivian Stanshall – vocals, ukulele
- Neil Innes – piano, organ, "heavenly sqwarking", "tasteless guitar solo" and vocals on "Fresh Wound"
- Anthony 'Bubs' White – electric "Brainbiter" guitar, spanish guitar
- Andy Roberts – fiddle, mandolin, rhythm guitar, acoustic guitar, "heavenly sqwarking"
- Dennis Cowan – bass guitar, slide guitar, voices
- Dave Richards – bass guitar, "empyreal screaming"
- Dick Parry – saxophone, flutes
- Hughie Flint – drums, percussion
- Roger Ruskin Spear – saxophones, xylophone, and lead vocals on "Waiting for the Wardrobe"
- "Legs" Larry Smith – drums on "Waiting for the Wardrobe" and "Rusty (Champion Thrust)", vocals on "Rusty (Champion Thrust)"
- Tony Kaye – piano and organ on "Rusty (Champion Thrust)"
- Ian Wallace - laughter on "Slush" (uncredited)

=== Production ===
- Neil Innes – mixing, arrangement, production on all tracks except "Rusty (Champion Thrust)"
- Vivian Stanshall – liner notes, production on all tracks except "Rusty (Champion Thrust)"
- Legs Larry Smith – production on "Rusty (Champion Thrust)"
- Tony Kaye – production on "Rusty (Champion Thrust)"
- Tom Newman – engineering
- Phil Newell – engineering

== Charts ==
Chart (1972)	Peak position
US Billboard Top LPs & Tape	199
