= John Walters (broadcaster) =

British radio producer (1939–2001)

- John Walters, 1980
- Born: 11 July 1939; Long Eaton, Derbyshire, England
- Died: 30 July 2001 (aged 62); Oxted, Surrey, England
- Spouse: Helen Gallagher (m. 1966)
- Presenting career
- Country: United Kingdom

John Walters (11 July 1939 – 30 July 2001) was a British radio producer, presenter and musician. Initially a schoolteacher and a jazz enthusiast, he played trumpet in The Mighty Joe Young Jazz Men and the 1960s pop group The Alan Price Set before joining BBC Radio 1 in 1967, where he was John Peel's producer from 1969 to 1991.

== Biography ==
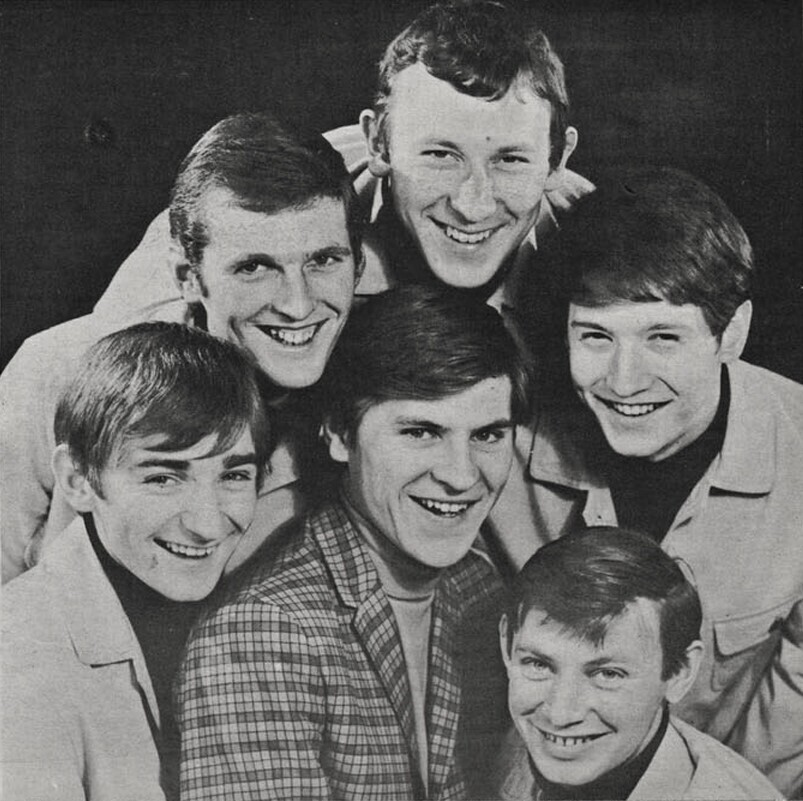
The Alan Price Set in 1966. Clockwise from bottom centre: Alan Price, Roy Mills, Steve Gregory, John Walters, Rod Slade, Clive Burrows.

Walters was born in Long Eaton, near Nottingham. He read fine arts at Durham University, where he worked under Victor Pasmore and as a student had his paintings exhibited alongside the works of David Hockney. He then taught at a comprehensive in Kenton, Newcastle-upon-Tyne, wrote a jazz column for the Newcastle Journal, gave evening classes in jazz history, played the trumpet with local bands and met Alan Price, then organist with the Animals. When Price quit to form his own group, Walters was recruited. He featured on five of the Alan Price Set's British hits, and played the Albert Hall and the Paris Olympia.

Walters joined the fledgling BBC Radio 1 in 1967 as a staff producer. He soon linked up with DJ John Peel and became his producer, starting in 1969. As a producer for Peel, he turned down the Sex Pistols for a "Peel session" when, drawing on his experience as a schoolteacher, he said Johnny Rotten "didn't look like the kind of boy you would trust to give out the scissors". He reportedly regretted this decision later, but was responsible for getting The Smiths their first session after witnessing an early concert. He was also responsible for The Fall's first session, a group which would later become Peel's favourite. Walters and Peel became close friends, with Walters being Peel's best man when he married his wife Sheila, and Peel requesting Walters play Roy Harper's "When an Old Cricketer Leaves the Crease" as his on-air memorial song if Peel were to die before Walters.

Walters also produced Vivian Stanshall's first foray into radio, both by overseeing Stanshall's Rawlinson End Radio Flashes when Stanshall stood in for a vacationing John Peel, and Stanshall's Sir Henry at Rawlinson End. He presented the long-running Radio 1 arts magazine Walters' Weekly, as well as Loose Ends and Idle thoughts, and was heard reviewing the music papers on the Janice Long show in the 1980s. In the 1990s, he was a reporter on the BBC's current affairs magazine Here and Now.

Walters died suddenly on 30 July 2001, from a heart attack, at the age of 62. He was survived by his wife, Helen.
