= Rawlinson End =

Radio broadcasts by Vivian Stanshall

Rawlinson End is a series of thirteen 15-20 minute radio broadcasts, created and performed by Vivian Stanshall (formerly of the Bonzo Dog Doo-Dah Band) for BBC Radio 1 between 1975 and 1991. The early sessions formed the template for Stanshall's 1978 album Sir Henry at Rawlinson End, as well as the 1980 film of the same name. Material from the three final episodes, recorded between 1988 and 1991, together with previously unreleased linking narration and music recorded by Stanshall in the 1990s, were compiled posthumously as the 2023 album Rawlinson's End.

== Background ==
Vivian Stanshall's first foray into radio as a solo artist began in 1970, with sessions for BBC radio DJ John Peel by his groups biG GRunt and Freaks. Afterward, John Peel's producer John Walters recruited Stanshall to substitute for Peel when the latter went on a month's "alcoholiday" in August 1971.

Each of Stanshall's four allotted two-hour slots, which he called "Radio Flashes", consisted of him acting as DJ, playing his own favourite records as well as Peel's usual playlist. He punctuated the records with semi-parodic DJ patter and flights of wistful and/or surreal fancy. Each episode included pre-recorded comedy sketches starring himself and actress Chris Bowler, and other absurdist interludes such as mock advertisements for large animal repellents such as "Rilla-Go!", "Repellephant" and "Rhi-No!". He also created a four-part radio serial, complete with cliffhanger ending, for each episode, depicting the bizarre exploits of Dick Barton-style gentleman adventurer Colonel Knutt and 'his cheeky cockney sidekick' Lemmy, starring himself as Colonel Knutt, The Who's drummer Keith Moon as Lemmy, and Traffic's drummer Jim Capaldi. It was this last feature of "Radio Flashes" that helped to sow the seeds for the "Sir Henry At Rawlinson End" radio broadcasts later in the decade.

Stanshall had already experimented with spoken-word performance on stage and record during his Bonzo Dog Band days, and by this point he had also created a lengthy spoken-word piece conceived and honed through live performances throughout 1970 and 1971, entitled "Rawlinson End". This piece was a reading of an apparently randomly-selected installment of a nonexistent 'continuing serial' that told the story of an eccentric, dysfunctional semi-aristocratic British family (the Rawlinsons) fallen on hard times at the dilapidated country estate of the title. Bearing some superficial resemblance to Blandings by P.G. Wodehouse but with added surrealistic imagery, obscure literary allusion, and a slightly scatological aftertaste, a version of the piece was broadcast on radio DJ John Peel's Top Gear on 20 March 1971, as part of a session by Stanshall's touring band Freaks.

According to Stanshall the format of Rawlinson End was originally inspired by the continuing weekly serials in vintage women's interest magazines that he would occasionally read one installment of, at random, while killing time in various waiting rooms (hence the 'Story So Far' prologue section ending with 'Now, read on..'). As a consequence of reading only a single isolated episode in a long serial, Stanshall never got any real sense of the complete story. Fortunately, being Vivian Stanshall, he was far more fascinated by this absence of beginning or end to a narrative than by the narrative itself, and so naturally he decided to explore this idea further. Creating the original Rawlinson End as an alleged installment of a longer multi-part serial - which did not actually exist beyond this single episode - Stanshall had no plans to expand upon it at that point. A different, more-polished version of the original piece (labeled "Part 14"), appears (possibly somewhat of necessity) on the Bonzo Dog Band's post-breakup contractual obligation album, Let's Make Up and Be Friendly (1972). This track marks the first official appearance of the Rawlinson family saga, although the name Rawlinson had already been attributed to various minor characters in Stanshall's lyrics throughout his Bonzo Dog Band days, including "The Intro and the Outro" from their first LP (1967). The Rawlinson family were now about to take centre stage in Stanshall's recording career, and would remain there until his untimely death in 1995.

At this point however, Rawlinson End was still merely a single orphaned episode of an otherwise entirely nonexistent serial. Stanshall had become a regular presence on BBC radio during the early 1970s, and his lugubrious tones and easy mastery of regional accents and vocal stylings seemed ideally-suited to create and perform in such a serial for radio, with him serving as both an omniscient narrator and performer of all the characters. However, the idea of expanding Rawlinson End into any kind of genuine continuing broadcast serial had seemingly still not occurred to him yet.

It was John Peel's producer John Walters who realised the piece's real potential as an ongoing broadcast radio serial, and suggested to Stanshall that the Rawlinson End concept could be expanded for regular episodic broadcast on Peel's show. Stanshall readily agreed.

Beginning in earnest with 'Christmas At Rawlinson End' in 1975, thirteen short episodes were produced over the next sixteen years. Each episode, or 'part,' was roughly 15–20 minutes long, and featured a variety of guest musicians alongside Stanshall's own vividly-drawn characterisations.

== The radio show ==
Stanshall's expanded Rawlinson End radio series (see below) was a more openly absurd dadaist parody of classic English radio drama serials, with a smattering of P.G. Wodehouse's Blandings Castle thrown in, as it now focused on the characters of Sir Henry Rawlinson and his family, who only briefly appeared or were mentioned only in passing in the original, embryonic versions of the saga.

Each episode of Rawlinson End (including even the very first show, "Part 21") opened with a musical prelude and The Narrator's announcement: "The Story So Far...", which is a common introductory device used in episodic serials of all kinds. In the case of Rawlinson End however, the details of this introduction were often unrelated to any previous events that had occurred in the narrative, and indeed each episode rarely continued in any logical order from the preceding one. Accordingly, the episodes, or 'Parts', were not always numbered in a strictly linear sequence.

== The albums and movie ==
By late 1978 the Rawlinson End radio broadcasts had spawned an LP record Sir Henry at Rawlinson End, which was a re-recorded distillation of material from the 1977-78 BBC sessions. This was followed in 1980 by the movie Sir Henry at Rawlinson End which by its very nature is a different beast to either radio broadcast or LP record, and expanded the concept further but arguably lost some of the original's imaginative charm and singularity of vision.

A somewhat lacklustre sequel LP, Sir Henry at N'didi’s Kraal, followed in 1984, released against Stanshall's wishes. Meanwhile the Rawlinson End radio broadcasts continued, sporadically, until 1991. At the time of Stanshall's death in 1995, he was said to be preparing and recording material for a new LP detailing Sir Henry's wartime exploits, provisionally entitled Plastered in Paris. The sessions for this project never got as far as finished vocal tracks though, so it remains unreleased.

== Episode list ==
At present the original radio series remains officially unreleased, but all the episodes exist as off air recordings made by listeners at home. The quality ranges from good to excellent.

No.	Title	Recorded	Broadcast	Songs	Including	Opening	Guest musicians	Length
#1	Aunt Florrie Remembers, from Rawlinson End, Part 21	16 October 1975	27 October 1975	Aunt Florrie's Waltz, Socks	Even the rats are hunchbacked, distrusting dentists	"The story so far: Sandra still smells, and Hubert has been sick."	Pete Moss (bass, piano, accordion, violin, cello), Mox (harmonica) and Bubs White (guitar, banjo, ukulele)	9:11
#2	Christmas at Rawlinson End, Parts 1 & 2	2 December 1975	22 & 23 December 1975	Torture My Tortie, Convivial Vivisectionists	Roxanne, awful squid marks, the sundial business	"Cannibalism at the Cine-Go-Go, or, you CAN have your kike and heat it. The story so far."	Julian Smedley (violin, mandolin), Andy Roberts (dulcimer)	17:31
#3	Christmas at Rawlinson End, Parts 3 & 4	2 December 1975	24 & 25 December 1975	Tonight We'll All Get Tight, All That Would Wash, The Party's Over	Uncle Otto, roar of the end, a half for Chuck	"Ralf heaves to. The story at once."	Julian Smedley (violin, mandolin), Andy Roberts (dulcimer)	20:18
#4	Part 34: An Absence of Whelks	21 March 1977	6 April 1977	Nice & Tidy	Hubert recalls, the history of broadcasting, Saint Epilonia, Ralf's musings, The wind in the willows, back at the Great House, the impossible shot	"The story so far: Loathsome Gerald has been caught observing the sun through a telescope and his squint is now permanent."	unlisted	14:19
#5	Part 35: Spades Balls and Sausage Trees	11 May 1977	23 May 1977	Interlewd, Sitting in a Sunken Garden	Sir Henry wakes, tongue sandwiches, Henry's rhinoceros tyranny, instant karma, the gibber poem, Mrs Radcliffe emerges	"English as tuppence, changing yet changeless as canal water, nestling in green nowhere, armoured and effete. Bold flag-bearer, opsimath, eremite, feudal, reactionary Rawlinson End. The story so far."	Zoot Money (guitar, piano, vocals), Barry Dransfield (violin, cello)	11:56
#6	The Road to Unreason (aka An Entrance of Trousers)	24 August & 14 December 1977	19 December 1977	Convivial Vivisectionists, Mrs Radcliffe (The Beast Inside)	Aunt Florrie recalls, shell shock, troops in the city	"The story so far: Hubert is growing mustard and cress in his left ear and performs even the most intimate of office with his head inclined to one side. Sir Henry's neck has healed nicely and Mrs Radcliffe has been banished from the house. Now read on dot dot dot."	Zoot Money (guitar, piano, vocals), Mox (harmonica, flute)	15:59
#7	A Fall of Felt Hats (aka Cantor's Home - Ten Lengths Clear of the Field)	29 March 1978	5 April 1978	Florrie's Waltz, Fool & Bladder, Interlewd, Smeeton	face jumping competition	"The story so far: The hapless and unusual Hubert, having unhappily chanced upon Sir Henry reliving the bombing of Dresden, has received a terrific thrashing and a crippling kick in the fork. He is now in disgrace, condemned to his room."	Julian Smedley (violin, mandolin), Jim Cuomo (clarinet, recorder, celeste, leg)	16:14
#8	Part 37: Cabbage Looking in Mufti	18 July 1978	25 July 1978	Zulu Song, Anonymous Barbers, Stripe Me a Pinky, Fresh Faced Boy, Ginger Geezer	Hubert shunned, Henry makes up, Hubert's stilts, P.C. Gibbon surveils, Art History, The Sewerage Works, phantom trousers	"The story so far: After the worm chewing outrage and Philippa Portley's continued and hysterical nausea, Hubert has been declared definitely off his chump by the Rawlinson family."	Julian Smedley (violin, mandolin), Pete Moss (bass, piano, accordion, violin, cello)	18:36
#9	Gooseflesh Steps, Part 1: The Hatchling	11 December 1979	24 December 1979	Cracks Are Showing	Rawlinson Shall Violently Punish, Sir Henry's blemish, the preparations for the eating, may God make you fart, Ben Quakebuttock comes to dinner, first courses	"Dr Headstuffing held the winking scalpel aloft with the delicacy and firmness of a man who knows his job. The shaking had stopped and from the liver bared before the blade to his noble mind pulsed a ligament of concentration."	Pete Moss (piano, doublebass, violin, mandolin, backing vocals), John Kirkpatrick (accordion, concertina, jews harp, backing vocals)	11:37
#10	The Crackpot at the End of the Rainbow	23 February 1988	18 April 1988	It's Murder Living Next Door, In The Garden, The Iguanadon	Here we are again, the dark bulb, under the sea	"For the last nine years Rawlinson End endured. But like the maze that grew before the great house, its inhabitants were pickled, corkscrewed, maddened and without light."	Pete Moss (bass, piano, accordion, violin, cello), Kenny Baldock (bass), Dave Swarbrick (violin, mandolin)	18:27
#11	The Eating at Rawlinson End	9 August 1988	23 November 1988	You'll Have A Nervous Breakdown Sure as Eggs is Eggs, Appearances Are So Misleading, Hubert's Buzzing Song, Sperling Is Right, Scrotum's Song	The Fool and Bladder, six privies, what's wrong with most people	"In the blue wardrobe of Heaven are many unused clothes, too tight fitting yet too beautiful to throw away. And in that wardrobe we hang our likenesses - yellow diaries, yellowed with yesterday, thumb-smeared with tomorrow. But the now - the present - like the hollow screech of ancient flamingos in search of shrimps, is still vibrantly, shocking pink."	Pete Moss (bass, piano, accordion, violin, cello), Dave Swarbrick (violin, mandolin), Tony Roberts, Danny Thompson (bass)	20:35
#12	Cackling Gas Capers	6 April 1991	29 May 1991	Octavio, Tour De Farce, Achmedillo, Peristaltic Waves	The consecration of Rawlinson End, the sauropod, Henry awoke on the billiard table, seems to me you're in need of treatment	"The exhausted egg yolk sun yawned and hoisted itself through the smug green smog wafting from Concreton estate, and split dawned, smearing the sky like the yellowy stain round a bath plug."	Dave Swarbrick (violin, mandolin), Tony Roberts, Danny Thompson (bass), Rodney Slater (saxophone), Roger Ruskin Spear (saxophones, clarinet, piano, guitars, percussion), Henry Lowther (trumpet), John Megginson (bass, keyboards), Les Cirkel	22:39
#13	The Thing at Rawlinson End	1991	21 September 1991	The Thing, The Queen's Hat	A guide in the way of success, trapped in the fridge, I hate prejudice	"The story so far: Bugger it. It's complete rubbish anyway."		15:53

=== 1996 reductions ===
In 1996 various parts of the series were edited down to five 14-minute programmes running Christmas week for Book at Bedtime on BBC Radio 4, in tribute to Stanshall who had died in 1995. These excerpts reportedly made even less sense than the originals.

- Monday 23 December 1996: Sir Henry Entertains (edits of programmes 5 and 7)
- Tuesday 24 December 1996: Cabbage Looking in Mufti (edit of programme 8)
- Wednesday 25 December 1996: A Christmas Eating at Rawlinson End (edit of programme 9)
- Thursday 26 December 1996: The Hatching (edit of programme 10)
- Friday 27 December 1996: Diplodocus vs Concreton (edit of programme 11)

== Spin-off ==
A television commercial for Ruddles real ales in 1993 featured the last appearance of Stanshall narrating as Hubert, played by Mel Smith and a cross-dressing Dawn French.
