= Keynsham (album) =

Studio album by Bonzo Dog Band
- Released: November 1969
- Recorded: Trident Studios, London
- Genre: Comedy rock, psychedelic pop, music hall
- Length: 38:19
- Label: Liberty LBS 83290 (also Sunset SLS 50375); Imperial Records
- Producer: Neil Innes, Vivian Stanshall

Bonzo Dog Band chronology
Tadpoles (1969)	Keynsham (1969)	Let's Make Up And Be Friendly (1972)

American Cover

Professional ratings
Review scores
Source	Rating
AllMusic	2/5 stars
The Encyclopedia of Popular Music	2/5 stars
The New Rolling Stone Record Guide	2/5 stars

Keynsham is the fourth album by the Bonzo Dog Band. It was released in 1969 on Liberty Records.

The album title is a reference to Horace Batchelor, a football pools predictor from Keynsham who regularly advertised his service on pop music radio broadcasts in the early 1960s. In advertisements Batchelor would spell out the town's name when reading his postal address. The album starts with a line taken from Batchelor's radio advertisement "I have personally won over..."

In 2007 the album was re-issued on CD by EMI with five bonus tracks. These bonus tracks were not performed by the Bonzo Dog Band. Instead they are actually taken from later solo single releases from the group members. The solo tracks are performed by Vivian Stanshall & Kilgaron, Neil Innes, Roger Ruskin Spear, and Topo D. Bil (a pseudonym of "Legs" Larry Smith.)

== Reception ==
Reviewing the album for AllMusic, David Cleary said: "The delightfully clever humor of the Bonzo Dog Band's prior releases almost totally eludes the group on this record. Songs here still parody familiar styles, but generally do so in a leaden and unengaging manner. A number of the selections here burlesque the late Beatles, Buffalo Springfield, and similar bands... Lyrics and performances are bland and pedestrian by past group standards, and a noticeable lack of enthusiasm permeates this disc. This weak release is only recommended to completists." Trouser Press wrote that "Keynsham goes over familiar ground without laying much new sod (other than [Roger] Spear’s wiggly theremin solo on 'Noises for the Leg')."

== Sleeve notes ==
"Mothers with children please note. This record is inedible!"

== Track listing ==
No.	Title	Writer(s)	Length
1.	"You Done My Brain In"	Neil Innes	1:41
2.	"Keynsham"	Innes	2:22
3.	"Quiet Talks & Summer Walks"	Innes	3:38
4.	"Tent"	Vivian Stanshall	3:06
5.	"We Were Wrong"	Stanshall	2:33
6.	"Joke Shop Man"	Innes	1:23
7.	"The Bride Stripped Bare (By The Bachelors)"	Stanshall, Innes	2:40
8.	"Look at Me, I'm Wonderful"	Stanshall	1:47
9.	"What Do You Do?"	Innes	3:12
10.	"Mr. Slater's Parrot"	Stanshall	2:27
11.	"Sport (The Odd Boy)"	Stanshall	3:31
12.	"I Want to Be with You"	Innes	2:17
13.	"Noises for the Leg"	Stanshall	1:54
14.	"Busted"	Stanshall, Innes	5:48

== Bonus tracks in 2007 CD re-issue ==
No.	Title	Writer(s)	Length
1.	"Are You Having Any Fun?"	Yellen, Fain (performer: Vivian Stanshall & Kilgaron)	2:33
2.	"How Sweet to Be an Idiot"	Innes (performer: Neil Innes)	2:49
3.	"When Yuba Plays the Rhumba on the Tuba Down in Cuba"	Hupfeld (performer: Roger Ruskin Spear)	3:02
4.	"The Young Ones"	Tepper, Bennett (performer: Vivian Stanshall & Kilgaron)	3:13
5.	"Witchi Tai To"	Jim Pepper (performer: Topo D. Bil, aka "Legs" Larry Smith)	3:28

== Personnel ==
=== Musicians ===
- All music played by – Bonzo Dog Band
- Cornet, Fish 'n' Chips – Gerry Salisbury ("Busted")
- Functions Of The Body arranged by – R. Slater
- Perfumed Parlour Snake – "Legs" Larry Smith
- Theremin (Leg) – Roger Ruskin Spear
- Narrator – Dennis Cowan, Vivian Stanshall

=== Other ===
- Producer – Neil Innes, Vivian Stanshall
- Engineer – Barry Sheffield
- Cover design, liner notes – Vivian Stanshall
