= John Brocklehurst, 1st Baron Ranksborough =

British soldier, courtier and Liberal politician

Major-General The Right Honourable The Lord Ranksborough CB CVO DL
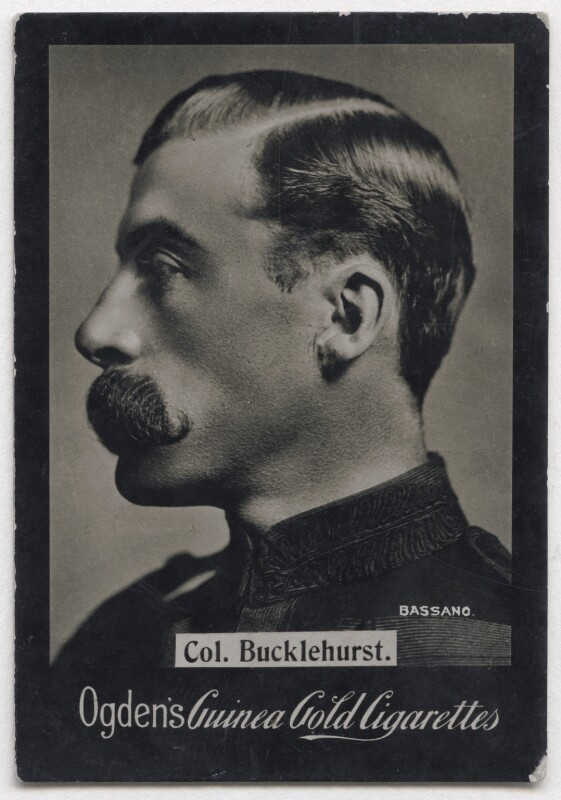
- Born: John Fielden Brocklehurst; 13 May 1852
- Died: 28 February 1921 (aged 68)
- Alma mater: Trinity College, Cambridge
- Children: Daniel Brocklehurst of Ashley

John Fielden Brocklehurst, 1st Baron Ranksborough, CB, CVO, DL (13 May 1852 – 28 February 1921) was a British Army officer, courtier and Liberal politician.

== Background and education ==
Brocklehurst was the son of Henry Brocklehurst, of Foden Bank, Macclesfield, and the grandson of John Brocklehurst, for many years Member of Parliament for Macclesfield. His mother was Anne, daughter of 'Honest' John Fielden, Member of Parliament for Oldham. He was educated at Rugby and Trinity College, Cambridge.

== Career ==
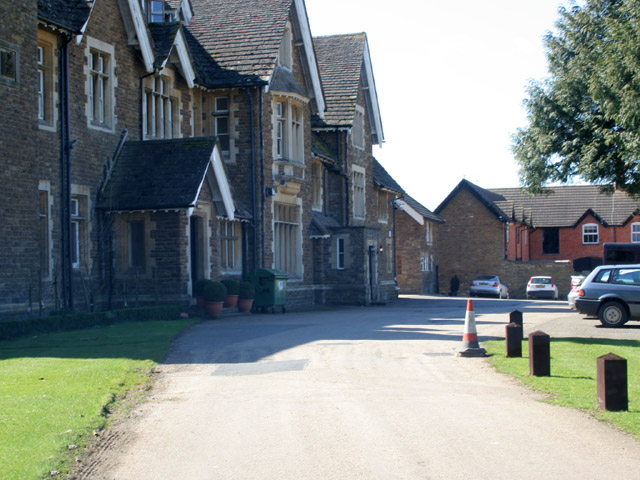
Ranksborough Hall in Rutland was constructed by Ranksborough in 1893.

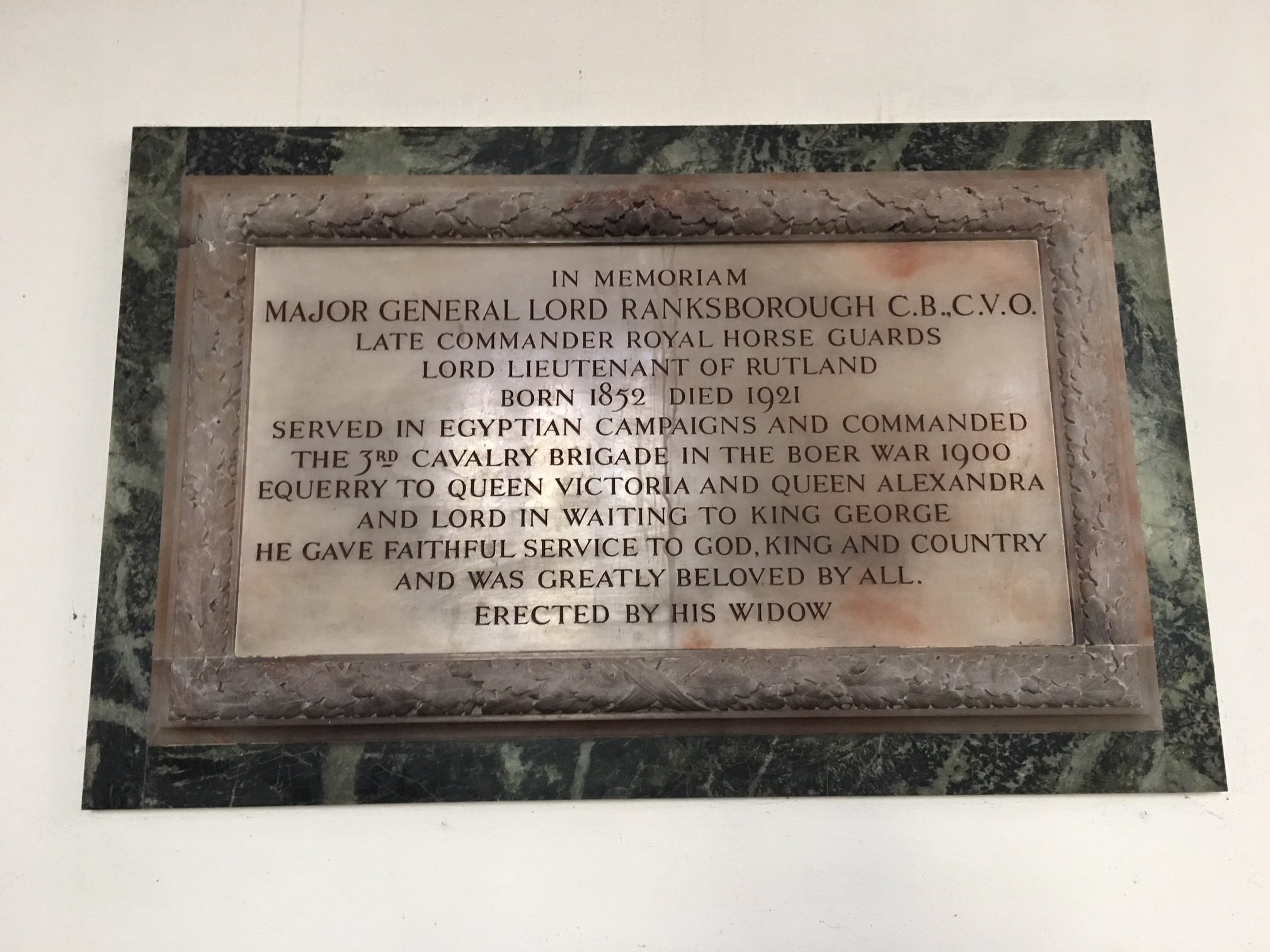
Memorial to John Brocklehurst, 1st Baron Ranksborough, in the Church of St Peter and St Paul, Langham

Brocklehurst was commissioned into the Royal Horse Guards in 1874. He served in the Anglo-Egyptian War in 1882 including the Battle of Kassasin, in the Sudan campaign of 1884 to 1885 and in the Second Boer War, achieving the rank of Major-General. In South Africa he commanded the 2nd Cavalry Brigade of the Natal Field Force and was in Ladysmith throughout the siege, but completed his service on the Staff and was placed on half-pay in January 1901. He retired from the army in 1908.

Brocklehurst was also an Equerry to Queen Victoria from 1899 to 1901 and to Queen Alexandra from 1901 to 1910 and an Extra Equerry to Alexandra from 1910 to 1921 and served as Lord-Lieutenant of Rutland between 1906 and 1921. In 1914 he was raised to the peerage as Baron Ranksborough, of Ranksborough in the County of Rutland. The title derived from his seat of Ranksborough Hall at Langham, Rutland, which he constructed in 1893 and which was often visited by members of the royal family. Ranksborough took his seat on the Liberal benches in the House of Lords and served under H. H. Asquith and later David Lloyd George as a Lord-in-waiting (government whip in the House of Lords) from 1915 to 1921.

== Honours and awards ==
Brocklehurst was appointed a Member of the Royal Victorian Order (MVO) in 1897, a Companion of the Order of the Bath (CB) for his war service in South Africa in 1900, and promoted to a Commander of the Royal Victorian Order (CVO) in late 1901.

He received the honorary freedom of the borough of his native town Macclesfield on 6 October 1902.

Coat of arms of John Brocklehurst, 1st Baron Ranksborough

Crest
In front of a mount Vert thereon two oak trees also Proper a brock Sable holding in its mouth a slip of the oak fructed Proper.
Escutcheon
Per pale Argent and Sable three chevronels engrailed between as many brocks all counterchanged.
Supporters
On either side a Roman soldier reguardant each resting the exterior hand on a shield all Proper.
Motto
Veritas Me Dirigit (Truth Directs Me)

== Personal life ==
Lord Ranksborough married Louisa Alice Parsons, daughter of the Hon. Laurence Parsons, in 1878. The marriage was childless. He died in February 1921, aged 68, when the barony became extinct. Lady Ranksborough died in 1937.

== Footnotes ==
Honorary titles
Preceded by The Earl of Dysart	Lord-Lieutenant of Rutland; 1906–1921	Succeeded by The Earl of Ancaster
Political offices
Preceded by The Lord Wimborne	Lord-in-waiting; 1915–1921	Succeeded by The Earl of Clarendon
Peerage of the United Kingdom
New creation	Baron Ranksborough; 1914–1921	Extinct
