= Terry clip =

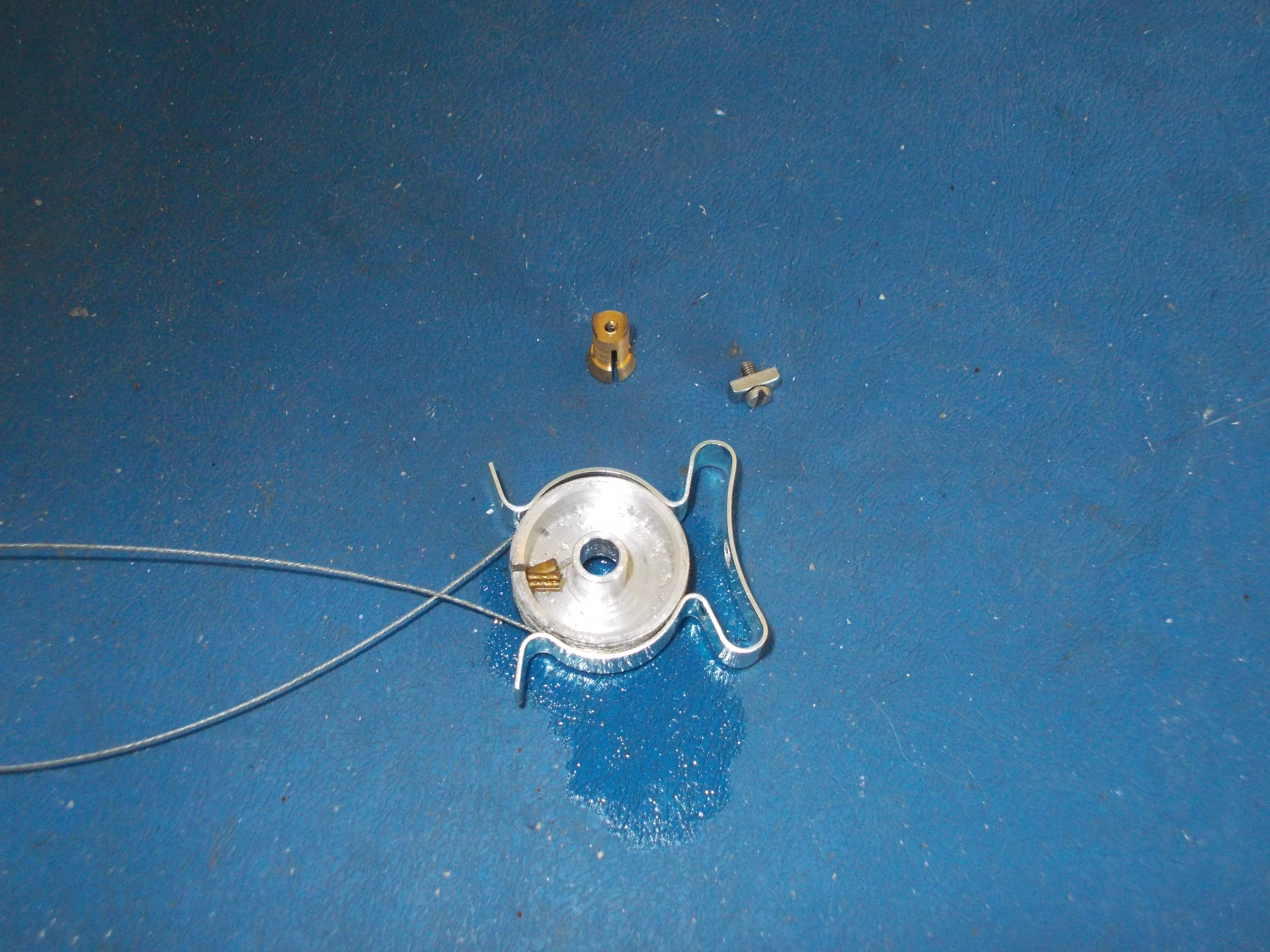
A Terry clip around the drum of a potentiometer

A Terry clip (or Terry's clip) is a spring metal clip used to hold a cylindrical object, for example, to secure a bicycle pump onto a bicycle frame. The object to be held is pushed into the clip to secure it, and pulled out to release. The original Terry clips were manufactured and sold by Herbert Terry & Sons Limited, Redditch, England (established in 1855).

== References in popular culture ==
- The Terry clip provided the inspiration for the song "Terry Keeps His Clips On" by Vivian Stanshall. This was recorded in 1975, but was not released until 1981 on the album Teddy Boys Don't Knit.
