= Gasper Lawal =

Nigerian drummer and composer (born 1948)

Gasper Lawal (born 23 September 1948 in Ijebu Ode, Nigeria) is a Nigerian drummer, griot, and composer who has publicized traditional African percussive languages in the West. As a performer, his "Afriki" sound created a fusion of Nigerian percussion styles with rock and jazz.

Since the early 1970s, Lawal has been part of the West African music scene in the UK. Described by music magazine Blues & Soul in 1989 as the "Nigerian octopus of sticks 'n' drums and anything percussive", he has worked extensively as a session player and arranger. Credits include work with The Rolling Stones, Stevie Winwood, John Martyn, Robert Palmer, Joe Cocker, Camel, Stephen Stills, Elkie Brooks, Babe Ruth (band), The Pogues, Joan Armatrading, Eddy Grant, Hugh Masekela, Barbra Streisand, Elvin Jones, Clancy, Ginger Baker's Air Force, Funkadelic and Dr. John.

In 1980, Lawal formed a group called the Oro Band, which nurtured musicians such as Adesose Wallace, and Sola Akingbola (percussionist for Jamiroquai) who would go on to have their own successful careers. The Oro Band performed throughout Europe and the UK, including headline concerts at The Forum, Astoria, and Ronnie Scott's in London; and supporting Peter Gabriel at Earls Court and Crystal Palace Stadium, several WOMAD festivals, Glastonbury Festival, the African Festival in Sardinia, and the Multicultural Festival in Barcelona.

In pursuit of a solo career, Lawal has released three albums entitled Ajomase (Cap Records, 1980), Abiosun'ni (Hot Records, 1985), and Kadara (Globe Style, 1991). "Kita-Kita", the hit single from Abiosun'ni remains one of the most played African records on UK radio.

Lawal performed for Queen Elizabeth II on two occasions: first at a special banquet for the Nigerian president in 1989 and then for the Commonwealth Celebrations Day in 1990.

Television and radio appearances have included Top of the Pops, MTV's Week in Rock, Kaleidoscope, Network Africa, The Old Grey Whistle Test, and David Attenborough's Wildlife on One special The Leopard (BBC1, 1995).

Lawal also composes for film and television, with music for the concert for Nelson Mandela in 1984, parts of the soundtrack for Erica Russell's award-winning animation Feet of Song (Channel 4, 1989), BBC documentary Nigeria: Giant on Trial (BBC2, 1992), African Express (Channel 4, 1996), and several television commercials.

== Discography ==
Solo albums

- Ajomase (Cap Records, 1980)
- Abiosun'ni (Hot Records, 1985)
- Kadara (Globe Style, 1991)

Featuring artist

- Funkadelic – Funkadelic (Westbound, 1970)
- Graham Bond – We Put Our Magick On (Vertigo Records, 1971)
- Stephen Stills - Stephen Stills 2 (Atlantic Records, 1971)
- Graham Bell – Graham Bell (Charisma, 1972)
- Vinegar Joe – Vinegar Joe (Island Records, 1972)
- Atlantis - It's Getting Better (Vertigo Records, 1973)
- Clancy – Seriously Speaking (Warner Brothers Records, 1975)
- Babe Ruth – First Base (Harvest, 1972); and Amar Caballero (Harvest, 1974)
- Vivian Stanshall – Men Opening Umbrellas Ahead (Warner Brothers Records,1974; Harkit Records, 2010; Poppydisc Records, 2012)
- Clancy – Every Day (Warner Brothers Records, 1975)
- Joan Armatrading – Back to the Night (A&M Records, 1975)
- Camel - Nude (Gamma/Decca, 1981)
- Wishbone Ash - Number the Brave (MCA, 1981)
- The Associates - Perhaps (WEA, 1985)
- Hugh Masekela - Techno-Bush (TELDEC, 1984)
- Icehouse – Measure for Measure (Chrysalis Records, 1986)
- 3 Mustaphas 3 – Heart of Uncle (Ace Records, 1989)
- The Pogues - Peace and love (Island Records, 1989)
