= Langham, Rutland =

Village in Rutland, England

Coordinates: 52.695°N 0.750°W

Langham
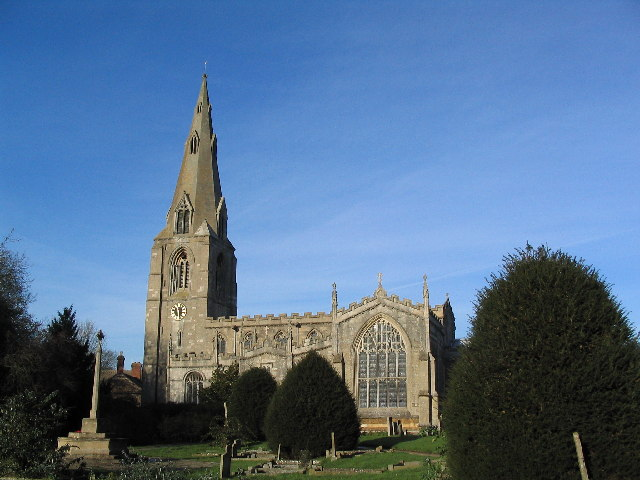
- Church of St Peter and St Paul, Langham

- Location within Rutland
- Area: 4.56 sq mi (11.8 km^{2})
- Population: 1,371 2011 Census
  - Density: 229/sq mi (88/km^{2})
- OS grid reference: SK845115
  - London: 87 miles (140 km) SSE
- Unitary authority: Rutland
- Shire county: Rutland
- Ceremonial county: Rutland
- Region: East Midlands
- Country: England
- Sovereign state: United Kingdom
- Post town: Oakham
- Postcode district: LE15
- Dialling code: 01572
- Police: Leicestershire
- Fire: Leicestershire
- Ambulance: East Midlands
- UK Parliament: Rutland and Stamford
- Website: Langham Village

Langham is a village and civil parish in Rutland in the East Midlands of England. The village is about 2 miles (3 km) north-west of Oakham, on the A606 main road linking Oakham and Melton Mowbray.

== Etymology ==
The village's name means "homestead/village which is long or hemmed-in land which is long".

== Amenities ==
It has two pubs, the Wheatsheaf and the Noel Arms, and a Church of England primary school. Langham Lodge is a Grade II listed house on the edge of the village.

The Church of England parish church of Saints Peter and Paul dates in part from the late 13th century and is a Grade I listed building. There is also a Baptist Chapel, built in 1854.

== Notable people ==
Notable inhabitants include Simon Langham, a 14th-century monk who became Archbishop of Canterbury; Major General John Brocklehurst, 1st Baron Ranksborough CB CVO (13 May 1852 – 28 February 1921), a soldier, courtier and Liberal politician - there is a memorial to the latter in the village church; and Alicia Kearns, the current MP for Rutland and Stamford.

== Industry and trade ==
Ruddles Brewery was based in Langham from its foundation in 1858 until it was closed in 1999. The water from the local well was said to give the beer a unique character and quality, which enhanced the brewery's reputation. The site of the brewery has now been demolished and replaced by a housing development.

The village used to have a small shop for everyday items, however this shut after campaigned against by villagers. Joan's Free range eggs sold locally farmed eggs for many years until its closing in 2022, more than 5 years after Joan's death.

Langham Engineering is based on the outskirts of the village and a leading manufacturer of precision machined components and shafts. Langham Engineering is the only business to still run from Langham having been there since its founding in the late 1970's.
