= Men Opening Umbrellas Ahead =

Studio album by Vivian Stanshall
- Released: August 1974
- Studios: The Manor, Oxfordshire
- Genres: Rock music Comedy music
- Length: 41:49
- Labels: Warner Bros. Records (1974); Harkit Records (2010); Poppydisc Records (2012)
- Producers: John Darnley, Vivian Stanshall

Vivian Stanshall chronology
Men Opening Umbrellas Ahead (1974)	Sir Henry at Rawlinson End (1978)

Professional ratings
Review scores
Source	Rating
AllMusic	4.5/5 stars
Mojo	4/5 stars

Men Opening Umbrellas Ahead is the 1974 debut solo album by the English musician, writer, poet and comedian Vivian Stanshall.

== Releases ==
The initial LP pressing was deleted by Warner Bros. Records soon after release, having sold only the initial vinyl pressing of 5,000 copies. The album remained out of print for over 35 years.

In 2010, an unauthorized CD reissue was made available by Harkit Records. The CD featured notes by Dutch dada-ist Freek Kinkelaar and featured two bonus tracks not on the original LP: "Baba Tunde" and "Lakonga". The bonus tracks come from a rare 1974 Warner Bros. single.

Poppydisc Records released a properly authorized remastered edition, on LP and CD, on 21 May 2012. The remastered CD contains the two bonus tracks, while the vinyl version is the same as the original vinyl LP.

== Track listing ==
All songs written and arranged by Vivian Stanshall, except where noted:

=== Side 1 ===
1. "Afoju Ti Ole Riran (Dead Eyes)" (Vivian Stanshall, Gaspar Lawal)
2. "Truck-Track"
3. "Yelp, Bellow, Rasp Et Cetera"
4. "Prong"
5. "Redeye"

=== Side 2 ===
6. "How The Zebra Got His Spots"
7. "Dwarf Succulents"
8. "Bout of Sobriety"
9. "Prong & Toots Go Steady"
10. "Strange Tongues"

=== Bonus tracks on 2010 and 2012 CD reissues ===
11. "Lakonga" (single A-side)
12. "Baba Tunde" (single B-side)

(Both tracks written by Stanshall and Lawal)

== Personnel ==
- Vivian Stanshall – vocals, recorder, euphonium, ukulele, Chelonian pipes
- Anthony "Bubs" White – electric guitar
- Steve Winwood – bass guitar, organ
- Gasper Lawal – talking drums, congas, xylophone, drum kit ("How The Zebra Got His Spots")
- Neil Innes – piano, slide guitar, organ ("How The Zebra Got His Spots")
- Jim Capaldi – drum kit, lesser log
- Deryk Quinn – cabassa, Nigerian coffee tables, greater log
- Ric Grech – violin
- Rebop Kwaku Baah – congas ("Prong & Toots")
- Doris Troy, Madeline Bell, Barry St. John – backing vocals
- Ayus Ape, Gani, Gasper Lawal – male Yoruba chorus
- unidentified West Indian taxi driver – bass guitar ("Lakonga" and "Baba Tunde")
- unidentified West Indian taxi driver's friend – drum kit ("Lakonga" and "Baba Tunde")
