= Jollity Farm =

1929 novelty song by Leslie Sarony

"Jollity Farm" (sometimes known as "Down On Jollity Farm") is a novelty song written and first performed by British entertainer Leslie Sarony. First released in 1929, it is a celebrated example of Sarony's humorous repertoire, and was rerecorded by several contemporaneous artists. It was revived in the 1960s by the Bonzo Dog Doo Dah Band.

== Background, composition and lyrics ==
Sarony wrote "Jollity Farm" as a parody of a darker-sounding counterpart, "Misery Farm" (Note: The "Jollity Farm" introduction notes that "There's a farm called Misery, but of that we'll have none".) by C. Jay Wallis, also from 1929, with his version describing a carefree, comic fantasy farm–hence the name "Jollity". Its lyrics present a farm where each verse describes a different animal and its corresponding sound: pigs "grunt and howl", cats "me-ow," dogs "bow wow," with ducks, cows, birds, lambs, and even a "buck rabbit" who sings "I'm a doe de-o-doe". The song, a comedy foxtrot with opportunities for audience participation, revels in absurdity. The playful nonsense and exaggerated performances were typical of Sarony's style, blending whimsy with music hall humour and comedic timing.

It is listed in the Roud Folk Song Index as V53412, though it is not from traditional folk sources but from Sarony's own novelty output.

== Original and contemporaneous recordings and stage performances ==
Sarony recorded the song in November 1929, and it was released on Zonophone, with the B-side "Bunkey doodle I doh," performed by the International Novelty Orchestra.

The song quickly became popular with British dance bands, and was rerecorded several times. Other contemporaneous recordings include: (Note: Most recordings only include the first five verses.)

- Hal Swain and his Band (December 1929)
- Jack Hylton and his Orchestra, vocals Leslie Sarony (January 1930)
- Jack Payne and his BBC Orchestra (February 1930)
- The Radio Melody Boys (February 1930)
- Bertini and his Band (February 1930)
- The Savoy Plaza Band (April 1930)
- Eddie Cole with Orchestral Accompaniment (1930)
- Ambrose and His Orchestra, vocals Lou Abelardo (1930)

The song also became a staple in variety and music hall acts; notably, Randolph Sutton featured it in his repertoire during the 1930s–1950s.

== Revival by Bonzo Dog Doo Dah Band ==
In October 1967, the Bonzo Dog Doo Dah Band released their debut album, Gorilla, featuring "Jollity Farm". The arrangement is delivered in the Bonzos' eclectic style, combining music hall, trad jazz, psychedelia, and surreal satire. Vivian Stanshall's theatrical vocals and Neil Innes's musical direction underpin the song's comedic tone; the ironic pastoral simplicity of Sarony's original remains intact yet is recontextualised amidst 1960s counterculture satire.

The Bonzos performed "Jollity Farm" in the debut episode of Do Not Adjust Your Set, broadcast on ITV on Boxing Day 1967, the same day as the Beatles' Magical Mystery Tour premiered on BBC. The Bonzos continued performing it in concerts for a few years, including at a Fillmore East show in October 1969.

The Bonzos' interpretation is now probably the best-remembered version, and it is frequently referenced either directly or by reuse of the title.

Later versions were recorded by Cocky (1976), and by Bob Kerr's Whoopee Band (1978).
