= Sir Henry at Rawlinson End (album) =

Studio album by Vivian Stanshall
- Released: 1978
- Recorded: June 1978
- Studios: Netherturkdonic Studios, Gloucestershire
- Genres: Spoken word Comedy; Comedy music
- Label: Charisma Records
- Producer: Vivian Stanshall

Vivian Stanshall chronology
Men Opening Umbrellas Ahead (1974)	Sir Henry at Rawlinson End (1978)	Teddy Boys Don't Knit (1981)

Sir Henry at Rawlinson End, released in 1978, is a largely spoken-word, solo comedy recording by British musician Vivian Stanshall, formerly of the Bonzo Dog Doo-Dah Band. It originated in his Rawlinson End sessions for the John Peel Show on BBC Radio 1 beginning in 1975, and a similarly-named track on the Bonzo Dog Band's 1972 album Let's Make Up and Be Friendly.

== Description ==
In 1971, Stanshall took over John Peel's BBC Radio 1 show, while the presenter was on holiday. Contributing to Peel programmes over several years, Stanshall played many new and old songs. He also piloted different musical and spoken-word comedy sketches and songs. Peel would later broadcast recordings made by Stanshall, in an occasional series focused on the drunken baronet Sir Henry Rawlinson and life at his decrepit country house, "Rawlinson End". Ultimately, Stanshall re-recorded several of these turns and an album Sir Henry at Rawlinson End was released on the Charisma Records label (CAS 1139) in 1978, with Stanshall taking multiple roles. It is filled with puns, double-entendres, pop-cultural references and clever wordplay. Stanshall initially takes the role of an unnamed narrator, then shifts between character and narrator. The recording features many musical interludes, performed on a variety of odd musical instruments. Guest performers include Steve Winwood and two of Stanshall's children: his son Rupert Stanshall and his stepdaughter, Sydney Longfellow (the child of his second wife Ki Longfellow-Stanshall).

=== Characters ===
The tracks are named after musical pieces, and most feature at least one vocal number, intermingled with spoken-word performances. Stanshall's characters include Sir Henry Rawlinson, his wife Lady Florrie Rawlinson (née Maynard), their children Ralph ('Raif') and Candice Rawlinson, and Henry's brothers Hubert (the younger brother) and Humbert (late older brother, deceased, and now a ghost).

Additional characters include the staff of Rawlinson End: Mr. Cumberpatch (former gardener), Old Scrotum the Wrinkled Retainer (butler) and Mrs. E (housekeeper); various relatives: Florrie's brother Lord Tarquin Portly of Staines and his wife Lady Phillipa of Staines. Other characters include the landlord of the local pub Seth One-Tooth, Reg Smeeton, a walking encyclopedia; and "contract house clean[ers]" and "resting theatrical artistes," Teddy Tidy and Nigel Nice.

== Reception ==
Professional ratings
Review scores
Source	Rating
AllMusic	2.5/5 stars

AllMusic's retrospective review was laudatory, commenting,

"Stanshall is superbly entertaining, a wordsmith who can trip from the sublime to the louche in the wink of an eye, from wicked puns to appalling jokes in a tale (of sorts) set in a country estate, and told in more accents than you can shake a stick at."

AllMusic argues that, though the concept of the album is complete nonsense, this doesn't detract from its entertainment value.

== Track listing ==
The fifteen tracks are essentially one long performance piece, but are divided as follows:

Tracks (songs)

- Aunt Florrie's Waltz – Theme: "Rawlinson End theme"; Aunt Florrie's Waltz
- Interlewd – Theme: Interlewd
- Wheelbarrow – Wheelbarrow
- Socks – Socks
- The Rub – The Rub
- Nice 'N' Tidy – Nice 'n' Tidy
- Pigs 'Ere Purse – Theme: Intermission for clarinet and lips – Pigs 'ere Purse
- 6/8 Hoodoo – Theme: 6/8 Hoodoo
- Smeeton – Smeeton
- Fool & Bladder – The Fool & Bladder
- Endroar – Endroar
- The Beasht Inshide – The Beasht Inshide
- Junglebunny – Theme: Junglebunny; Theme: Soft "Rawlinson End theme"
- Rawlinsons & Maynards – Rawlinsons & Maynards
- Papadumb – Theme: Papadumb; Theme: "Rawlinson End theme"; "Rawlinson End theme" variations

== Personnel ==
- Vivian Stanshall – vocals & narration, talking drum, bean, thumb piano, clay drum, baconium, wooden cornet, banjolele, percussion, jabbamok, cacaphone, balalaika, phonofiddle, bina (a scale-changing harmonium), Th'at, piano, sarrusophone, recorders, euphonium, bass harmonica, jaw harp, cornets, trombone, ukulele, threeps, truncheon, tuba, guitar, melodica, flageolets, dum-dum, kazoo and mouth trumpet
- Pete Moss – musical direction, accordion, cello, fiddle, banjo and violin
- Steve Winwood – mini-moog, banjolin, organ, pipe-organ, balalaika, piano, celeste, mandolin and accordion
- Jim Cuomo – flageolet, recorder, bass & soprano saxophones and clarinet
- Julian Smedley – violin, mandolin, guitar and fiddle
- The Exishanshalliste Songsters (Rupert Stanshall and Sydney Longfellow) – backing vocals on "Wheelbarrow"
- Jim French ("Terrier-man to the Cotswold Hunt") – holler & hunting-horn on "6/8 Hoodoo theme"

== Other media ==
The story as described on the album (as well as most of the script) was used as the basis for the 1980 film version Sir Henry at Rawlinson End starring Trevor Howard as Sir Henry, and Vivian Stanshall as Hubert (and voiceover narration). To tie in with the film, Eel Pie Publishing released the script/transcription as Sir Henry at Rawlinson End And Other Spots, a 112pg script book. (ISBN 0-906-00821-2)

In 1983, a semi-sequel entitled Sir Henry at N'didi’s Kraal was released by Demon Verbals, with the catalogue number "VERB 1".

In 1994, Stanshall joined Mel Smith and Dawn French (both playing Sir Henry in different adverts) in a series of television advertisements for real ale purveyor Ruddles Beer.

In 1995, Virgin released Sir Henry at Rawlinson End on CD and cassette under their "Virgin Chattering Classics" label. The sequel Sir Henry at N'didi’s Kraal was released on CD by Edsel in 1999.

In June 2010 Guilty Dog Productions, with the full support of the Stanshall family, resurrected the 1978 album and re-imagined it as a one-man show starring Mike Livesley as the narrator and all characters, backed by a six-piece band replicating the instrumentation of the original. The show won rave reviews from the Liverpool Echo, the Liverpool Daily Post, and Liverpool 7 Streets. The show received its London premiere on 14 October 2011. The premiere was a huge success and the show drew praise from Neil Innes and Adrian Edmondson who were in the audience. The show also received another, this time from MOJO Magazine's Andrew Male. After this success preparation began for a London run.

A follow-up to the album, re-constructed and produced by Michael Livesley, was issued by Madfish Music as Rawlinson's End in 2023.
