= Sir Henry at N'didi's Kraal =

Studio album by Vivian Stanshall
- Released: 1984
- Genres: Spoken word Comedy; Comedy music
- Label: Diablo
- Producer: Glen Colson

Vivian Stanshall chronology
Teddy Boys Don't Knit (1981)	Sir Henry at N'didi's Kraal (1984)

Professional ratings
Review scores
Source	Rating
AllMusic	link

Sir Henry at N'didi's Kraal is the fourth and final solo album by the English singer-songwriter Vivian Stanshall. It is a return to the largely spoken-word, solo comedy format of Stanshall's second album Sir Henry at Rawlinson End (1978) and is a sequel to the same work.

== Background ==
Sir Henry at N'didi's Kraal continues the story of the dissolute aristocrat and explorer Sir Henry Rawlinson, this time dealing with his attempts on behalf of the "Geographic Society" to locate a lost tribe of Zulus in South Africa. In contrast to Sir Henry at Rawlinson End, it is almost entirely spoken word, with only one song included. The album is predominantly a parody of the colonial manners and attitudes of the British Empire, using Sir Henry as a mouthpiece for various ridiculous and sometimes racist philosophies which Stanshall could spoof. It has been described as "a contradictory mix of Sir Henry's belief in racial superiority and (Stanshall's) genuine affection for African culture."

The album was recorded at a low point in Stanshall's life following his separation from his second wife Ki Longfellow and their young family, during which he was suffering from severe alcohol and prescription medicine abuse. Stanshall was unhappy with the album's unpolished content, editing and low production values and subsequently disowned it. The producer, Glen Colson, has defended the release and his own work on it by protesting that Stanshall's depressed and intoxicated state diminished his creative input and that Colson himself was obliged to finish the album as best he could.

Although Stanshall would continue to produce one-off recordings, advertisements and Stinkfoot, a Comic Opera, Sir Henry at N'didi's Kraal is his final album.

Stanshall later recorded music and narration intended to form an album by linking together material from his final three John Peel BBC sessions, recorded in 1988-1991. However, this project was not completed at the time of his death. It was not until 2023 that Michael Livesley, with the assistance of Andy Frizell, did so under the title Rawlinson's End.

== Track listing ==
1. "Sir Henry at N'didi's Kraal" - 51:42

== Personnel ==
- Vivian Stanshall - vocals and narration, trumpet, percussion
- Susie Honeyman - violin
- Sean Oliver - bass guitar
- Jon Glyn - saxophone
- John Scott - footsteps
- Bruce Smith - drums
- Mario Tavares - producer
- Simon The Lodger - unexplained contribution
- Ralph Steadman - artwork
