= Ruddles Brewery =

Brewery in Rutland, England

G. Ruddle & Co
- Founded: 1959; 67 years ago in Langham, Rutland
- Defunct: 1999
- Fate: Brewery closed in 1999 and production moved to Abingdon, Oxfordshire; Brand acquired by Greene King with purchase of Morland in 2000
- Headquarters: Rutland, England, United Kingdom
- Owner: George Ruddle (from 1912)
- Parent: Watneys (1986-1992); Grolsch (1992-1997); Morland & Co (from 1997)

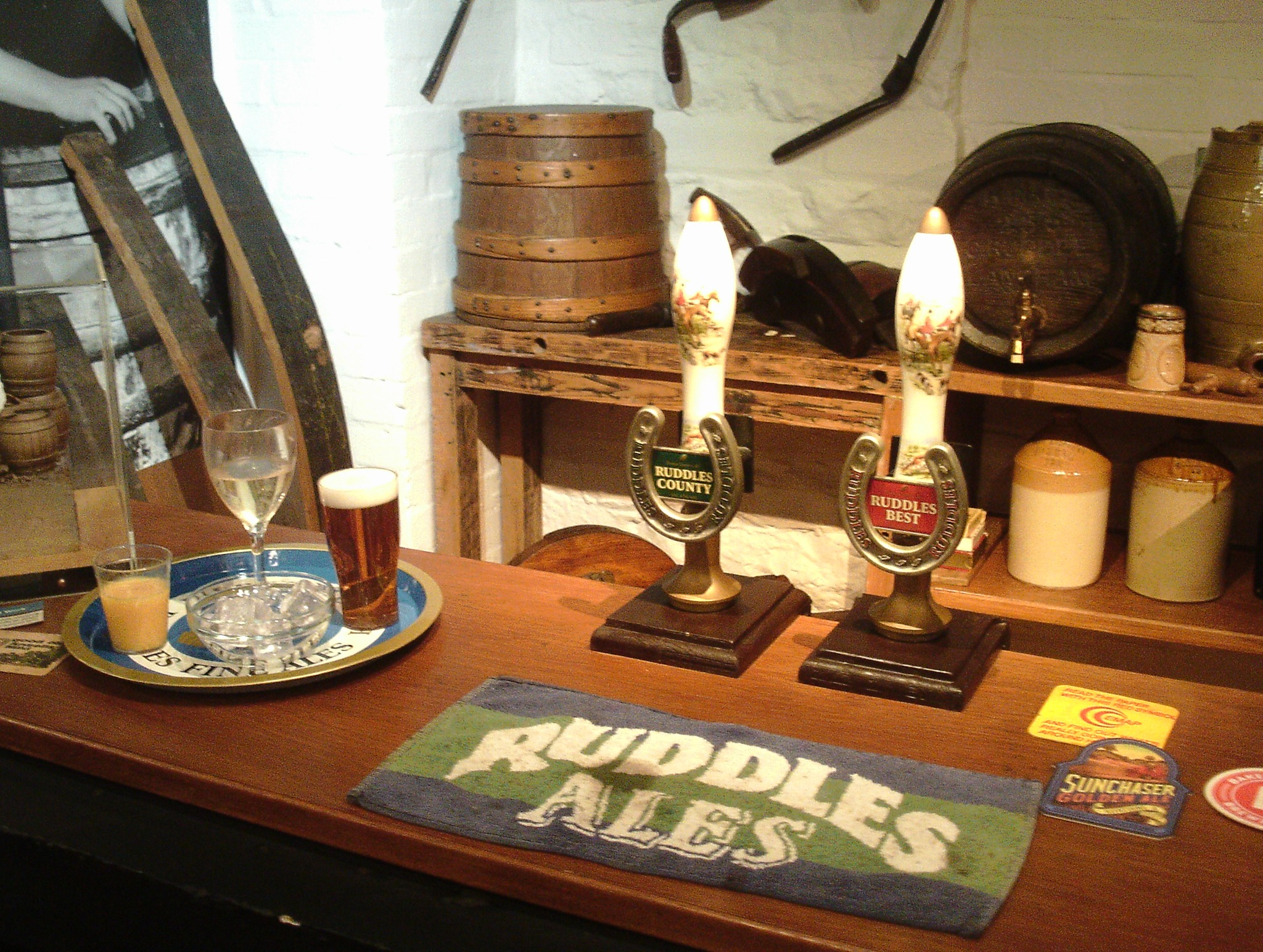
Bar display in Rutland County Museum

Ruddles Brewery (G. Ruddle & Co) was a brewery in Rutland, England. The brand is now owned by Greene King who still brew beers under the Ruddles name in Suffolk, although the current recipes are not those used at the original brewery.

The brewery, established in 1858 in Langham, Rutland, was bought by George Ruddle in 1912. Langham remained the home of the brewery until its closure in 1999. The company lost its independence in 1986 and passed into the ownership of Watneys, and then Grolsch in 1992. The value of the brewery and brands had dropped to £4.8m when it was sold to Morland & Co in 1997. Morlands moved production to Abingdon only for that site to be closed by Greene King which took over Morlands in 2000.

The local Langham well water was said to give the beer a unique character and quality which enhanced the brewery's reputation. The difficulty in reproducing elsewhere the taste of the beers has led to the premier beer being jocularly referred to as "Ruddles Counterfeit".

In 1996, Rutland bitter was the third of British beers to have achieved Protected Geographical Indication status; this followed an application by Grolsch Ruddles. Since Greene King closed the Langham brewery, they cannot take advantage of the registration. However, in 2010 former Ruddles head brewer Tony Davis revived Rutland Bitter, brewed at his Grainstore Brewery in Oakham, Rutland.

A television commercial for Ruddles in 1993 featured the last appearance of Vivian Stanshall narrating as Hubert, brother of Sir Henry Rawlinson of Rawlinson End played by Mel Smith and a cross-dressing Dawn French.

In 1996, Ruddles Best won the gold medal in the ordinary bitter category at the first World Beer Cup. Ruddles Best took silver in the bitter category at the Champion Beer of Britain in 1997.

Greene King have now inverted the horseshoe emblem on Ruddles branding.

Ruddles also are part of Aldi's ‘Inspired Cuisine' line with their beer in the Beef filled Yorkshire Pudding.

== Beers ==
- Ruddles County
- Ruddles Best
- Ruddles Organic
- Ruddles Rhubarb

== In popular culture ==
Being regarded as one of England's cheapest beers, it is used as a reference in the HBO series Veep.
