= Vivian Stanshall =

English musician and author (1943–1995)

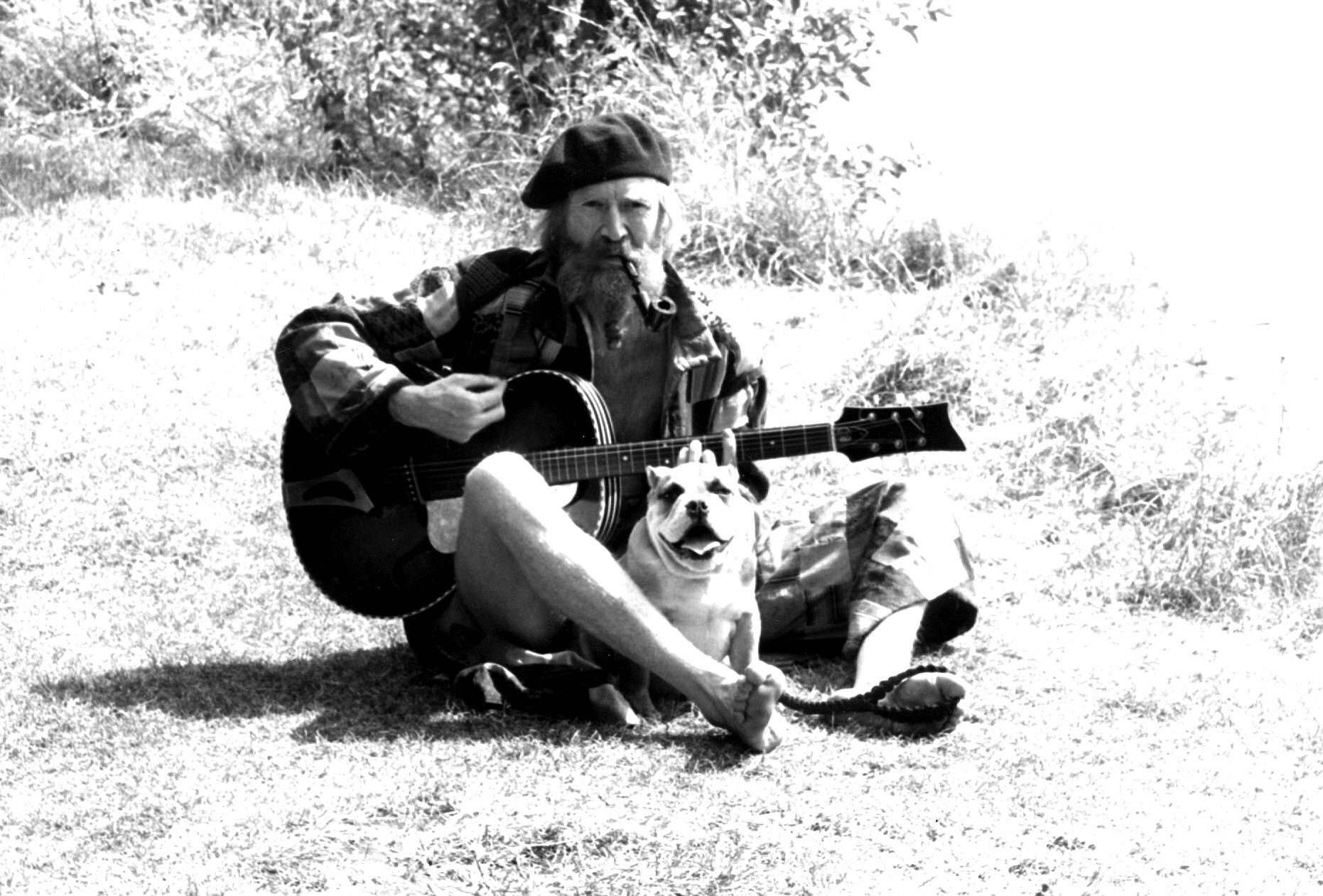
- Stanshall with his bulldog Bones on a towpath in Shepperton, England, 1980

Background information
- Also known as: Viv Stanshall
- Born: Victor Anthony Stanshall; 21 March 1943; Shillingford, Oxfordshire, England
- Died: 5 March 1995 (aged 51) Muswell Hill, London, England
- Genres: Rock and roll; satire; spoken word; comedy rock; psychedelic pop; trad jazz; avant-garde
- Occupations: Musician; singer-songwriter; multi-instrumentalist; comic; broadcaster; raconteur; poet; actor; writer
- Instruments: Vocals; trumpet; euphonium; tuba; trombone; guitar; keyboards; percussion; phonofiddle; flute; recorder; ukulele; mandolin; banjo; harp; harmonica; kazoo
- Years active: 1965–1995
- Labels: Warner Bros.; Liberty; Charisma; Polydor
- Formerly of: Bonzo Dog Doo-Dah Band; GRIMMS
- Spouses: Monica Peiser (m. 1968; div. 1975) Ki Longfellow (m. 1980)

Vivian Stanshall (born Victor Anthony Stanshall; 21 March 1943 – 5 March 1995) was an English singer-songwriter, musician, author, poet and wit, best known for his work with the Bonzo Dog Doo-Dah Band, for his exploration of the British upper classes in Sir Henry at Rawlinson End (as a radio series for John Peel, as an audio recording, as a book and as a film), and for acting as Master of Ceremonies on Mike Oldfield's album Tubular Bells.

== Early life and education ==
Stanshall was born on 21 March 1943 at the Radcliffe Maternity Home Shillingford, Oxfordshire. His father, Victor George Stanshall (born Vivian), was, at the time of his son's birth an RAF corporal, later a company secretary, then company director (FCIS). His mother was Eileen Monica Prudence (née Wadeson). He was christened Victor Anthony. He lived with his mother while his father served in the RAF during the Second World War. Stanshall described this early period as the happiest time of his childhood. (Note: Stanshall later said: "So I went through this horrible period when I went out speaking in an East London accent otherwise I was gonna' get hit, and when I got home it was "Hello Mama" and "Hello Papa". To some extent I forgive him that. What I don't forgive him is his intolerance. At the time the BBC had a commonality of speech, you didn't hear accents or dialects. Although he's been dead for two years I'm still terrified of him now... ")

When the war ended his father returned, but the young Victor found him difficult and comparatively stern after having been alone with his mother. His father made him speak with a "plummy" accent for which he later became known. The family moved to the father's hometown of Walthamstow, Essex, where Stanshall's younger brother Mark was born in 1949. With six years between them, the brothers were never close.

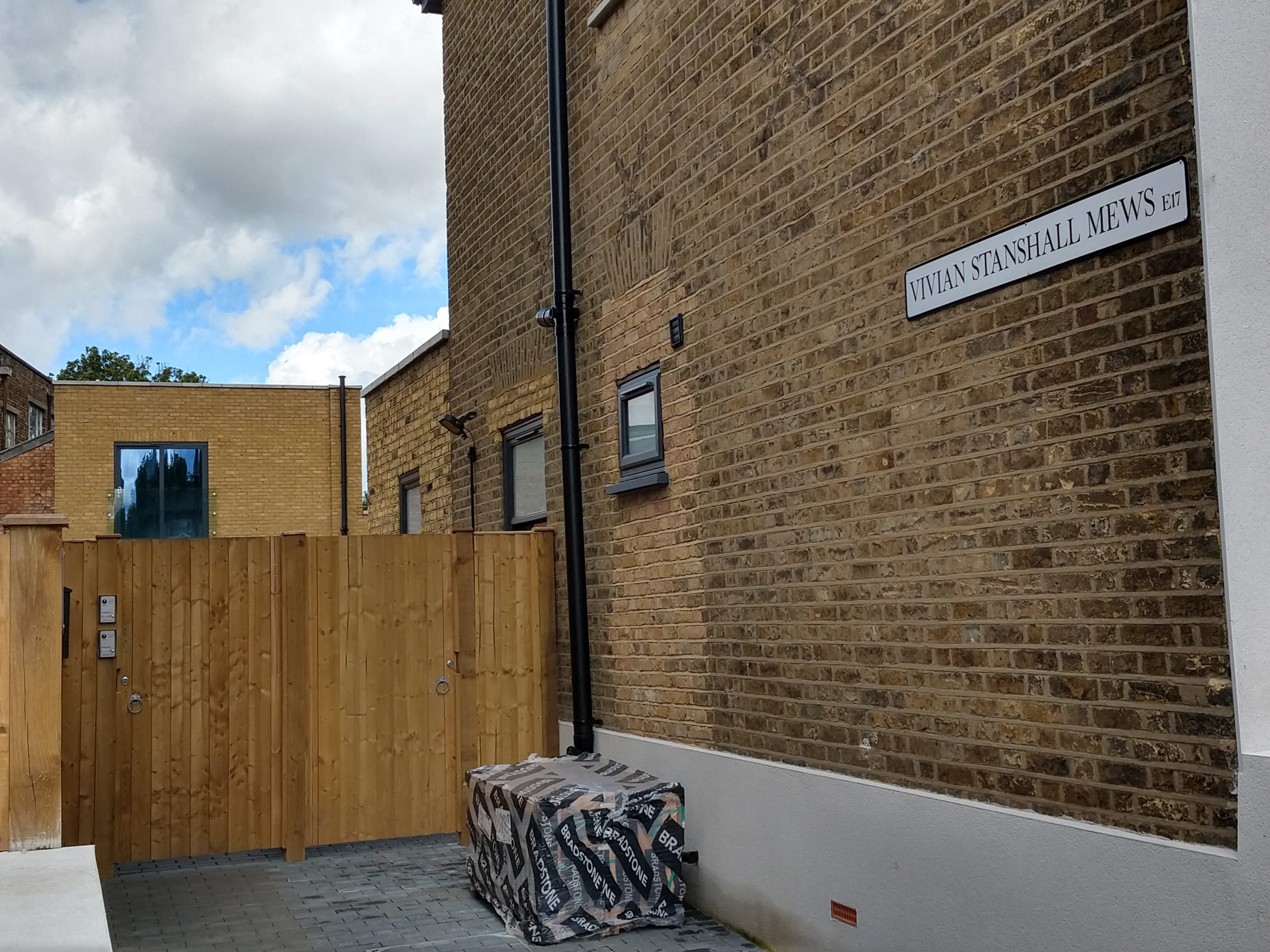
Cul-de-sac named after Stanshall, close to his childhood home in Walthamstow

When he was 10, the Stanshall family moved to the Essex coastal town of Leigh-on-Sea. He attended Southend High School for Boys until 1959. Stanshall then studied at Walthamstow College of Art, where he met fellow students Ian Dury and Peter Greenaway.

As a young man, Stanshall (known as Vic) earned money doing various odd jobs at the Kursaal fun fair in nearby Southend-on-Sea. These included working as a bingo caller and spending the winter painting the fairground attractions. To set aside enough money to get through art school (his father having refused to fund this), Stanshall spent a year in the Merchant Navy. He said he was a very bad waiter, but became a great teller of tall tales.

Stanshall enrolled at the Central School of Art and Design in London. He joined fellow students in forming a band (including Rodney Slater, Roger Ruskin Spear and Neil Innes, who was studying art at Goldsmiths College). Innes said of their first meeting: "We first met in a big Irish pub in South London, the New Cross Arms ... he was quite plump in those days, and he was wearing Billy Bunter check trousers, a Victorian frock coat, black coat tails, horrible little oval, violet-tinted pince-nez glasses, he had a euphonium under his arm, and large rubber false ears. And I thought, well, this is an interesting character." At about this time, Stanshall changed his first name to 'Vivian', the name his father had abandoned. This was not made his legal name until 1977. Those who knew him from his student days continued to call him 'Vic'. Later friends and collaborators knew him as 'Viv'.

== Bonzo years ==
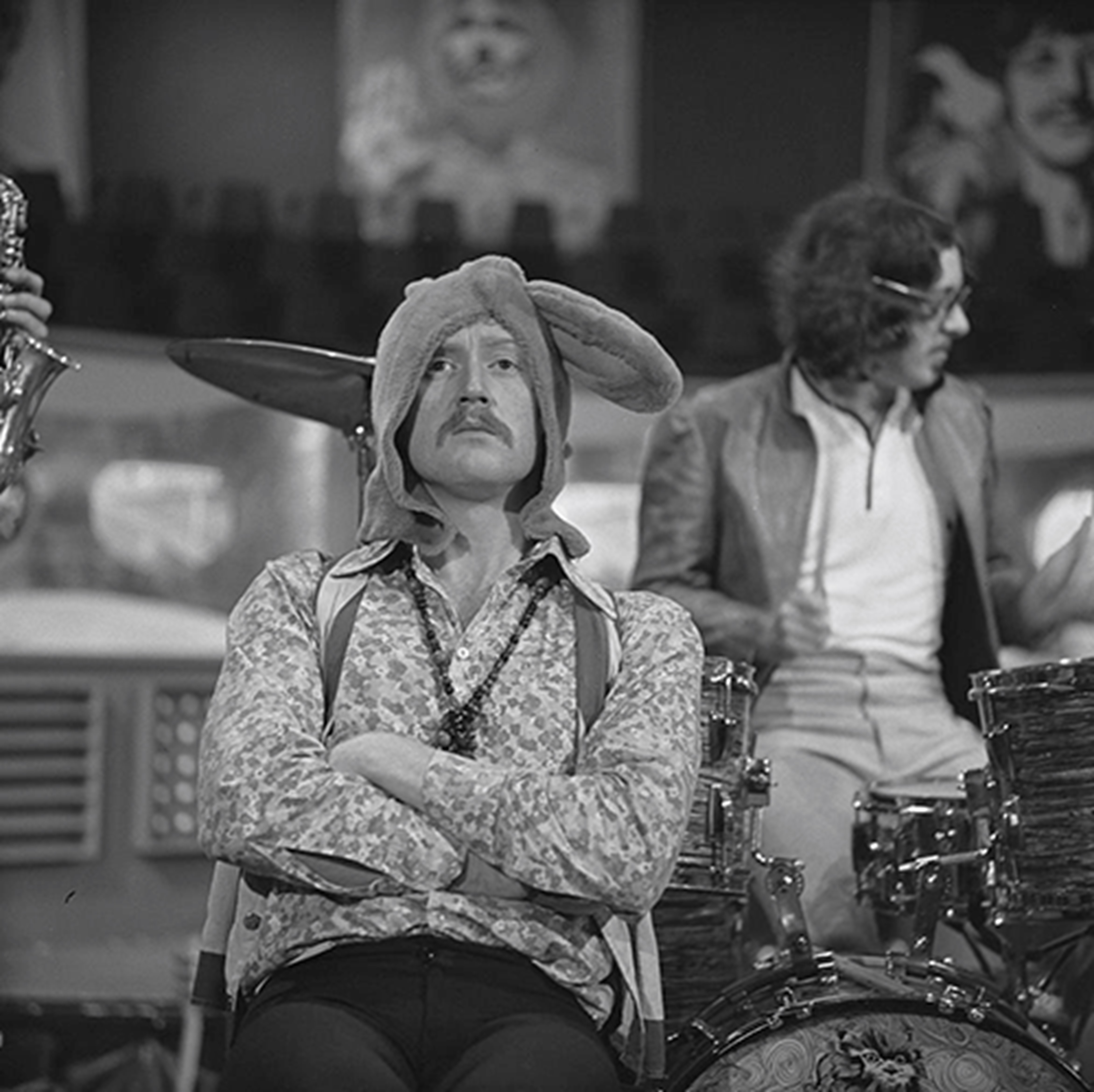
Stanshall with The Bonzo Dog Band on the Dutch TV show Fenklup, 1968

The Bonzo Dog Doo-Dah Band were named after a word game that Stanshall played with co-founder Slater, in which they cut up sentences and juxtaposed fragments to form new ones. 'Bonzo Dog/Dada' was one result which they liked. The band initially performed under this name, but grew tired of explaining what Dada meant; hence they changed it to the Bonzo Dog Doo-Dah Band, 'doo-dah' being a quaint expression that both Slater's mother and Stanshall himself used to describe everyday objects. Later this name was shortened to The Bonzo Dog Band, or just The Bonzos.

Much of the band's original repertoire was based on comedic re-workings of songs from the 1920s and 1930s, found on 78 records, bought for pennies from local flea markets.

For a while the band operated semi-professionally, playing local pubs and the college circuit. After acquiring a manager, they went full-time and were booked on the working men's club circuit, mainly in the north of England. The band dominated their lives, as they frequently travelled to low-paying gigs in an old van crammed with any number of musical instruments, an assortment of props, and prop robots. In 1967, they appeared in the Beatles' television film Magical Mystery Tour, in which they played Stanshall's "Death Cab for Cutie" during the strip club scene. The appearance led to a spot as the house band on Do Not Adjust Your Set, a weekly children's television revue series that was also notable for early appearances by Eric Idle, Terry Jones, and Michael Palin, who later became half of Monty Python.

According to their manager/agent Gerry Bron, after a perhaps ill-advised agreement that the band should be left to their own artistic devices, Stanshall was allowed several weeks in a hired rehearsal space to write songs for the new Bonzo Dog Band album. When Bron arrived at the location to check the progress of these endeavours, he found that Stanshall had not written anything at all and had instead built a variety of hutches for his pet rabbits. Bron mentioned in a television documentary that this occurred in May 1968 in a hall in Acton, west London; the actual location is Askew Road Church Hall, at the start of Bassein Park Road in Shepherd's Bush. The date would suggest that these were rehearsals for the album The Doughnut in Granny's Greenhouse. During recordings for the album proper at Morgan Studios, Stanshall, wearing just a rabbit's head and underpants, interviewed members of the public in Willesden High Road. On the album track "We Are Normal", one interviewee can be heard to remark, 'He's got a head on him like a rabbit.'

Later in 1968, the Bonzos scored a surprise top-ten hit with "I'm the Urban Spaceman" co-produced by Paul McCartney and Gus Dudgeon under the alias 'Apollo C. Vermouth'. Meanwhile the band toured incessantly and recorded a multitude of radio sessions for the BBC, alongside several albums. They also embarked upon two poorly organised but well-received tours of the United States. (Neil Innes remembers that the band were stopped by a local sheriff and asked if they were carrying any firearms or drugs. When they denied both, the officer asked how they were going to defend themselves. Stanshall piped up from the back of the minibus, "With good manners!") It was during the particularly disastrously organised second tour that the Bonzos decided to break up, partly because of Stanshall's growing stage fright – combined with his increasing use of valium to help combat this – but also because of anger with their management, after Spear's wife suffered a miscarriage while he was away, and no-one informed him. The band subsequently decided to split whilst they were still friends. They played their last show in March 1970, at Loughborough University.

== After the Bonzos ==
Stanshall formed a number of short-lived groups during 1970 alone, including biG GRunt (formed while the Bonzos were still on their farewell tour, and including fellow Bonzos Roger Ruskin Spear and Dennis Cowan, and with Anthony 'Bubs' White on guitar), The Sean Head Showband (again featuring Cowan and White), Gargantuan Chums, and the slightly longer-lived Bonzo Dog Freaks, with Innes and the ever-faithful Cowan and White (this conglomerate was also known simply as 'Freaks'). Early that year, biG GRunt recorded a well-received session for BBC Radio 1 disc jockey John Peel, and shortly afterwards made a memorable appearance on BBC television. Despite this promising start, biG GRunt dissolved during their first UK tour when Stanshall became incapacitated by the onset of an anxiety disorder that caused a nervous breakdown and would continue to plague him for the rest of his life.

However, he soon recovered sufficiently to record and release, on the Liberty label, his first solo single "Labio-Dental Fricative/Paper Round", credited to Vivian Stanshall and The Sean Head Showband (an oblique reference to Stanshall having shaved off all of his hair during his breakdown), and featuring Eric Clapton on guitar. Later in the year, his single version of Terry Stafford's song "Suspicion", credited to Vivian Stanshall and Gargantuan Chums and featuring Keith Moon and John Entwistle of the Who, was released. Featured on the B-side was "Blind Date", the only officially released track by biG GRunt. (However, all of Stanshall's backing bands of 1970 featured the same core personnel, so it could be argued that they were essentially the same band, masquerading under a variety of names.)

In early 1971, Stanshall reunited again with Innes, Cowan and White as 'Freaks' to tour new material. In order to promote ticket sales, they were more often than not billed as 'Bonzo Dog Freaks'. With Keith Moon guesting on drums, Freaks quickly recorded a BBC radio session for John Peel that featured solo numbers by Stanshall and Innes alongside tracks from Let's Make Up And Be Friendly, the Bonzos' yet-to-be recorded contractual obligation/reunion album of 1972. The session is also notable for marking the first appearance in any medium of an episode of Stanshall's magnum opus, Rawlinson End. Stanshall also found time during this period to be a founder member of the performance/poetry/music group Grimms, alongside Innes, The Scaffold and associated poets and musicians. Although Stanshall left Grimms before they made any recordings, he did continue to perform live with them on occasion.

Throughout this period, still suffering badly with anxiety and now drinking heavily to self-medicate, Stanshall nonetheless continued to write, record and tour with Freaks and Grimms (and briefly as guest touring frontman for The Temperance Seven in 1972). He was also a regular guest, broadcaster and presenter on numerous series on BBC radio.

Despite his ongoing personal difficulties, Stanshall's humorous exploits continued unabated. His adventures with long-time drinking buddy Keith Moon (who would become Stanshall's regular partner in crime for much of the 1970s after producing and appearing on Stanshall's single "Suspicion") were legendary. In one quite possibly apocryphal example, Stanshall visited a tailor's shop where he admired a pair of trousers on display. Moon then arrived, posing as another customer, and admired the same trousers, demanding to buy them. When Stanshall protested, the two men fought and split the trousers in two, so that they ended up with one leg each; the tailor, understandably, became furious. Then, a one-legged actor – hired by Stanshall and Moon – arrived, saw the split trousers, and proclaimed: "Ah! Just what I was looking for! I'll buy them!"

Thanks to his association with John Peel, in 1971 Stanshall was asked to fill in for the disc jockey while he was on a month's holiday. The resulting short series, titled Vivian Stanshall's Radio Flashes, was recorded under the supervision of Peel's regular producer John Walters and broadcast on BBC Radio One on Saturday afternoons during August 1971. The series of four two-hour programmes were a mix of music and specially written and recorded comedic sketches. Of the original four episodes, only episodes 2, 3 and 4 remain in the BBC archives; these were re-broadcast on BBC Radio 4 Extra in 2014 and again in 2016. All four episodes and a Christmas 1971 compilation special have also circulated among collectors as low-quality, edited off-air recordings since the 1970s. Contributors to the sketches in Radio Flashes included Moon, Traffic's Jim Capaldi and actress Chris Bowler. The sketches included a four-part serial adventure titled "Breath From The Pit", featuring the surreal exploits of a Dick Barton or Bulldog Drummond-style gentleman adventurer, Colonel Knutt (played by Stanshall) and his working-class sidekick, the 'likeable cheeky cockney, Lemmy'. This character was a thinly veiled parody of the character of the same name from Charles Chilton's Journey into Space, with Moon playing the role of Lemmy.

== Rawlinson End ==
Stanshall had developed what many consider to be his seminal work, Rawlinson End, as a spoken word performance piece during the first few years of the 1970s, recording an early version as part of The Bonzo Dog Band's reunion project Let's Make Up And Be Friendly. Beginning in 1975, he expanded upon the concept as an episodic surrealist radio serial for BBC Radio 1's John Peel slot, elaborating further upon the weird and wonderful adventures of the inebriated and blimpish Sir Henry Rawlinson, his wife, the distanced and ethereal Florrie, his "unusual" brother Hubert, loyal manservant Old Scrotum 'the wrinkled retainer', the rambling and unhygienic cook Mrs E.; and many other inhabitants of the crumbling Rawlinson End and its environs. Stanshall had been playing around with the Rawlinson characters for some time, and they were first referred to on the Bonzos' 1967 number, "The Intro and the Outro": 'Great to hear the Rawlinsons on trombone.'

In 1978, Stanshall released an album, Sir Henry at Rawlinson End, that reworked some material from the Peel sessions. This in turn was adapted into a film version in 1980, which was produced in a sepia-tinted black-and-white. It starred Trevor Howard as Sir Henry, and Stanshall as Hubert. Some of the film's music was provided in collaboration with Stanshall's friend Steve Winwood. A book of the same title – by Stanshall, illustrated with stills from the film – was published by Eel Pie Publishing in 1980. Nominally a film novelisation, it was distilled from the various versions and included considerable material that did not make it to the film. A projected second book, The Eating at Rawlinson End, was never completed.

A second Rawlinson album, Sir Henry at N'didi’s Kraal (1984), recounts Sir Henry's disastrous African expedition, omitting the rest of the Rawlinson clan. At the time, Stanshall was living on The Searchlight, a houseboat that he had bought from Denny Laine and kept moored near Shepperton on the River Thames. He lived on The Searchlight from 1977 to 1983, and recorded and produced the second 'Sir Henry' album on it during a period of debilitating physical illness. The album was disowned by Stanshall after its release, as he said it was both unfinished and unsatisfactory, and that the record label had rush-released it without his permission in an attempt to profit from his potentially imminent demise.

However, the noticeably superior BBC radio broadcasts continued sporadically until late 1991. In the same year, a temporarily rejuvenated Stanshall embarked upon a nationwide concert tour, titled 'Rawlinson Dog Ends', with support from former Bonzos and centred around a performance of new Rawlinson End material.

'Sir Henry' was last seen in a television commercial for Ruddles Real Ale (c. 1994), where he was portrayed by a cross-dressing Dawn French, presiding over a family banquet at a long table; shortly afterwards, Stanshall himself reprised the role of Hubert, reciting a poem loosely based on Edward Lear's "The Owl and the Pussycat".

During this same period, Stanshall embarked upon the recording of a proposed new Rawlinson End album, but this activity was curtailed in its early stages by its creator's untimely death in March 1995. After this, BBC Radio 4 retrieved some of the original Peel show recordings from the vaults for late-night repeat during Christmas 1996.

== 1970s ==
Stanshall regularly performed live with Grimms, as well as occasionally working with The Alberts and The Temperance Seven during the first few years of the decade. He was also a frequent contributor to BBC radio at this time, appearing weekly on Start The Week and Jack de Manio Precisely, and also on the BBC television satire series Up Sunday.

In 1973, Stanshall recorded tracks for the soundtrack album of the movie That'll Be the Day backed by Moon, Ronnie Wood, Graham Bond and Jack Bruce, and collaborated on numerous musical projects, making a memorable appearance as the Master of Ceremonies on Mike Oldfield's 1973 album Tubular Bells. (He reprised the role for Tubular Bells II in 1992, but the final release featured Alan Rickman instead.) Stanshall made guest appearances on a number of other artists' recordings including John Entwistle's Smash Your Head Against The Wall in 1971, Mike Hart's Basher, Chalky, Pongo and Me in 1972, Pete Brown's The Not Forgotten Association in 1973, and Robert Calvert's 1974 concept album Captain Lockheed and the Starfighters.

In early 1974, Stanshall wrote, arranged, and quickly recorded his first solo album, Men Opening Umbrellas Ahead. A rather more serious work than many would have expected, its darkly comic lyrics detailed Stanshall's alcoholism and troubled emotional state, laced with surreal poetic imagery and literary reference. Other lyrics included implicit references to other musicians and the music business, and a rather more explicit satire of the author's relationship with his own penis. Musically, while certain tracks display Stanshall's usual keen sense of rock and roll parody, most of the album has a 'tribal' or 'fusion' flavour. Prominently featuring the Nigerian musician Gasper Lawal and with many tracks infused with richly textured African percussion and chorus vocal stylings, the album (and its contemporary single "Lakonga") can justifiably lay claim to being an early, unheralded example of a crossover between world music and rock music. Stanshall's long-standing friends and colleagues Innes, White, Traffic's Steve Winwood, Jim Capaldi, Ric Grech and Rebop Kwaku Baah, Doris Troy and Madeline Bell also made notable guest appearances. Deleted after its first pressing and out of print for many years, the album was finally re-released on CD in 2012.

The BBC documentary One Man's Week, broadcast on 9 April 1975, documented a week in Stanshall's life and included footage of him at The Manor recording studio during the sessions for Men Opening Umbrellas Ahead, where he played with White, Lawal, Mongezi Feza, and Derek (or Deryk) Quinn.

In 1975, Stanshall provided the narration for Peter and the Wolf, produced by Robin Lumley and Jack Lancaster and featuring, among others, Gary Moore, Manfred Mann, Phil Collins, Bill Bruford, Stéphane Grappelli, Alvin Lee, Cozy Powell, Brian Eno and Jon Hiseman. 1976 saw the release of his single "The Young Ones", where the old Cliff Richard standard was delivered in the style of Boris Karloff.

In 1977, Stanshall and his companion, Pamela 'Ki' Longfellow, moved into a houseboat, The Searchlight, moored on the Thames between Chertsey and Shepperton. During this period, Stanshall compiled and re-recorded material from his popular BBC Radio 1 broadcasts for Peel, which was released as Sir Henry at Rawlinson End in 1978. He also wrote the script for the film adaptation of the same name, later produced for Tony Stratton Smith's Charisma Records company in 1980.

== 1980s ==
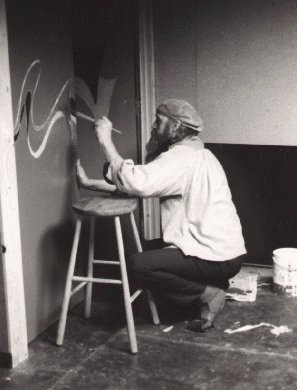
Stanshall painting the doors into the hold of The Thekla

Following 'Sir Henry', Stanshall wrote the songs for his third album Teddy Boys Don't Knit (1981), which included three songs about his family, and contributed a lyric to Winwood's Arc of a Diver. He and Longfellow married in 1980, and together they wrote some of the songs they later used for a musical comedy, Stinkfoot, a Comic Opera.

In 1982, Stanshall provided a spoken word segment on "Lovely Money", a single by The Damned.

After The Searchlight eventually sank, the Stanshalls lived and worked on The Thekla, a Baltic Trader, which Ki sailed 732 nautical miles (1,356 km) from Sunderland to be moored in the Bristol Docks. Ki had bought the vessel and converted her into a floating theatre called 'The Old Profanity Showboat'. Stanshall joined her on it in 1983, when they opened the doors of the theatre. By this time, he was already suffering from alcohol and drug abuse, having become addicted to Valium while trying to control his anxiety.

In December 1985, The Old Profanity Showboat produced the debut of their work Stinkfoot, A Comic Opera. Stanshall wrote 27 original songs for the opera, sharing book and lyric writing with his wife. It has proved popular over the years, and was revived in London some years later, with Peter Moss as musical director. It was also produced in concert form in Bristol, in July 2010.

Having returned to London alone in 1986 while his wife recovered from an illness, Stanshall saw Stinkfoot briefly, but unsuccessfully, revived at the Bloomsbury Theatre. After this, he returned to the stage again, touring in a solo show, 'Rawlinson Dog-Ends', initially with support from musicians including Jack Bruce. When Bruce quit, over a lack of adequate rehearsals, Moss stepped in to provide bass.

== Marriage and family ==
In 1968, Stanshall married fellow art student Monica Peiser, and their son Rupert was born that year. They divorced in 1975.

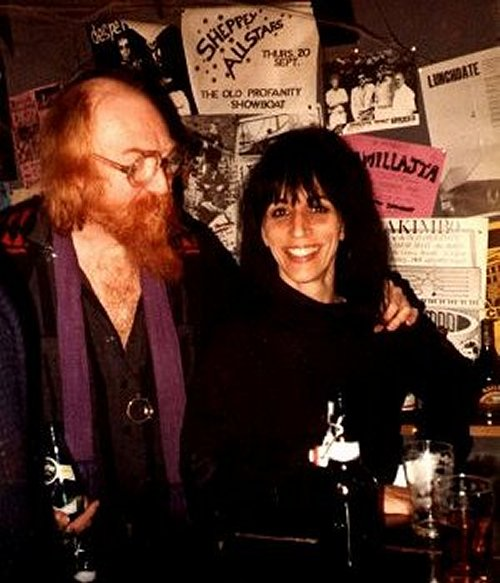
Vivian Stanshall and Ki Longfellow-Stanshall in the hold of The Thekla

On 9 September 1980, Stanshall married Pamela 'Ki' Longfellow, an American writer who had a daughter from an earlier relationship. The Stanshalls had a daughter, Silky, born on 16 August 1979, before they married; she was named after Silky Sullivan, a racehorse that was a childhood favourite of her mother. Stanshall celebrated Silky's birth in "The Tube", and his marriage to Ki in "Bewilderbeeste", both songs being included on his album Teddy Boys Don't Knit. He later gave his wife the name of 'Ki' from a dream. Even though their comic opera Stinkfoot was a success in late 1985, Stanshall returned alone to London after the turn of the year, while Longfellow recuperated from an illness brought on by overwork and stress. The Stanshalls lived apart until his sudden death in March 1995.

Years later, Longfellow wrote The Illustrated Vivian Stanshall: A Fairytale of Grimm Art, detailing Stanshall's life and work from 1977 to 1995.

== Memoirs ==
In 1993, Stanshall made a 15-minute autobiographical piece called Vivian Stanshall: The Early Years, a.k.a. Crank, for BBC2's The Late Show. He confessed to having been terrified of his father, who he said had always disapproved of him. His last television appearance, on The Late Show, was broadcast on 27 November that year.

A programme for BBC Radio 4, Vivian Stanshall: Essex Teenager to Renaissance Man (1994) included an interview with his mother. She insisted his father had loved him. Stanshall said on the same programme that his father had never shown it, not even on his deathbed.

== Death ==
Stanshall was found dead on the morning of 6 March 1995, after an electrical fire had broken out as he slept in his top-floor flat in Muswell Hill, north London. His private funeral service was held at the Golders Green Crematorium, north London. A few days later his memorial service was held at St Patrick's Church, Soho Square.

A memorial plaque was unveiled in the Poets' Corner at Golders Green Crematorium on 13 December 2015, opposite that of his friend Keith Moon, by his widow Ki and his daughter Silky. Others attending included actor Tony Slattery, singer Linda Thompson and actress Cherri Gilham. The cost of the plaque was met by many of his fans and friends via online crowdfunding.

== Legacy and honours ==
Writing in The Independent after Stanshall's death, Chris Welch wrote: "Seen by some as a wild eccentric, and a powerful personality who could be both charming and intimidating, Stanshall was perhaps too large a figure even for the music business to handle. ... He needed a producer to channel his energies, but always wanted to remain his own boss, having suffered too many perceived indignities in his early experience of the music business." He was described by Neil Innes as "a national treasure".

In 2001, Welch and Lucian Randall wrote a biography titled Ginger Geezer: The Life of Vivian Stanshall. In the same year, Jeremy Pascall and Stephen Fry produced a documentary about Stanshall for BBC Radio 4. Fry knew Stanshall quite well and, along with his personal thoughts, introduced a series of reminiscences. The show featured many clips from Stanshall's work. The recording includes one of Stanshall's last poems, titled "With My Mouth Turned Down for the Night".

In 2003, Sea Urchin Editions published the script of the Stanshalls' Stinkfoot: An English Comic Opera, with an introduction by his widow, Ki.

On 22 December 2009, BBC Radio 4's series Great Lives featured a programme on Stanshall, who had been nominated by Neil Innes, with Ki Longfellow as expert witness, hosted by Matthew Parris.

In June 2010, the 1978 album Sir Henry at Rawlinson End was re-imagined by Michael Livesley as a one-man show, in which he starred as the narrator and all the characters, backed by a six-piece band replicating the instrumentation of the original. The production won rave reviews, then premiered in London on 14 October 2011. It also drew praise from Innes and Adrian Edmondson, who were in the audience. On 25 March 2013, to celebrate the 70th anniversary of Stanshall's birth, Livesley was joined by Innes, Rick Wakeman, Danny Thompson, Rodney Slater, Sam Spoons, Vernon Dudley Bowhay-Nowell, 'Legs' Larry Smith and John Otway, to perform Sir Henry at Rawlinson End at the Bloomsbury Theatre. The event was organised by Livesley and Stanshall's son Rupert.

On 11 October 2011, the Blackpool Comedy Carpet, a large public artwork by Gordon Young, was unveiled in Blackpool on the town's seaside promenade. It is made of 300 slabs of granite that cover about 2,200 square metres. Featuring catchphrases, jokes and names, it commemorates more than 1,000 selected "influential" comics, most of whom have played Blackpool in the last hundred years. The project was commissioned by the Blackpool Council as part of its redevelopment plan, and it is one of the largest pieces of public art in the United Kingdom. Stanshall is represented in the work by two quotes and his name.

In 2012, Poppydisc Records reissued both a vinyl and CD version of Stanshall's Men Opening Umbrellas Ahead, remastered with new liner notes from his widow and daughter.

On 26 January 2018, Longfellow's biography/memoir/free-form art book detailing Stanshall's life was published. Filled with Stanshall's paintings, sketches, notes, letters, and private photographs, The Illustrated Vivian Stanshall, a Fairytale of Grimm Art (illustrated by the young illustrator and animator Ben Wickey) contains not only Longfellow's impressions of the life and work of her husband of 18 years, but also the remembrances of many of his closest friends, as well as Vivian's private journals.

In July 2023, Madfish Music released two posthumously completed albums by Stanshall: Dog Howl in Tune, a rock album originally intended as a follow-up to Teddy Boys Don't Knit; and Rawlinson's End, using the remaining tapes from Vivian's archive. In the case of Rawlinson's End, some of the narration and music was recorded by Stanshall, while the rest incorporates material from the existing BBC John Peel sessions, including some that was previously unbroadcast. The first was re-constructed and produced by Andy Frizell, the second by Michael Livesley.

== Solo discography ==
=== Singles ===
- "Labio Dental Fricative" b/w "Paper Round" – Vivian Stanshall and the Sean Head Showband (Liberty: LBF 15309, 1970)
- "Suspicion" – Vivian Stanshall & Gargantuan Chums b/w "Blind Date" – Vivian Stanshall & biG GRunt (Fly Records: BUG4, 1970)
- "Lakonga" b/w "Baba Tunde" (Warner Bros. Records: K 16424, 1974)
- "The Young Ones" b/w "Are You Having Any Fun?"/"The Question" (Harvest Records: HAR 5114, 1976)
- "Terry Keeps His Clips On" b/w "King Cripple" (Charisma Records; CB 373, 1980)
- "Calypso To Colapso" b/w "Smoke Signals at Night" (Charisma Records; CB 382, 1981)
- "Blind Date", "11 Moustachioed Daughters" b/w "The Strain", "Cyborg Signal" (Mega Dodo; MEP4, 2016 – a vinyl release of biG GRunt's 1970 BBC session)

=== Albums ===
- Men Opening Umbrellas Ahead (1974)
- Sir Henry at Rawlinson End (1978)
- Teddy Boys Don't Knit (1981)
- Sir Henry at N'didi’s Kraal (1984)
- Dog Howl in Tune (2023, posthumous)
- Rawlinson's End (2023, posthumous)

=== Other appearances ===
- That'll Be The Day (1973, soundtrack: two tracks)
- Tubular Bells by Mike Oldfield, as Master of Ceremonies. (1973)
- Captain Lockheed and the Starfighters by Robert Calvert (1974) Plays many of the lead characters.
- "Dream Gerrard" from Traffic's 1974 album When the Eagle Flies, Stanshall lyrics, Steve Winwood music.
- Lovely Money, a single released by The Damned in 1982.
- The Roughler Presents The Warwick Sessions Volume 1 (1987, compilation: one track "Holiday Home")
- "The Last Temptation of Elvis" (1989, compilation: one track, "(There's) No Room To Rhumba in a Sports Car")
- The Famous Charisma Box (1993, compilation: nine tracks)
- The Charisma Poser (1993, compilation: one track "Eulogy")
