= Sir Henry at Rawlinson End (film) =

- DVD cover
- Directed by: Steve Roberts
- Written by: Vivian Stanshall and Steve Roberts
- Produced by: Tony Stratton Smith; Spencer Tandy
- Starring: Trevor Howard; Patrick Magee; Denise Coffey; J. G. Devlin; Harry Fowler; Sheila Reid; Jeremy Child; Liz Smith
- Narrated by: Vivian Stanshall
- Cinematography: Martin Bell
- Edited by: Chris Rose
- Music by: Vivian Stanshall
- Distributed by: Digital Classics DVD
- Release date: 1980
- Running time: 73 minutes
- Country: United Kingdom
- Language: English

Sir Henry at Rawlinson End is a 1980 British film based on the eponymous character created by Vivian Stanshall (see Rawlinson End, Sir Henry at Rawlinson End (album)). It stars Trevor Howard as Sir Henry and Stanshall himself as Henry's brother Hubert. Unusually, the film was released in sepia-toned monochrome. After a long wait, while the film obtained cult status, it was finally released on DVD in 2006. The bonuses include a commentary track with the director, Steve Roberts, as well as Sheila Reid (Aunt Florrie) and Jeremy Child (Peregrine Maynard), as well as a picture gallery, synopsis, the script of unfilmed scenes, and actor biographies.

== Plot ==
The plot of Sir Henry at Rawlinson End revolves around attempts to exorcise the ghost of Humbert, the brother of drunken aristocrat Sir Henry (Trevor Howard) who was accidentally killed in a drunken duck-shooting incident whilst escaping trouserless from an illicit tryst. It transpires that Humbert's ghost will not rest until it is supplied with replacement trousers. Until then the ghost walks the corridors of Rawlinson End, often accompanied by that of Humbert's dog Gums which has repossessed its own body, now stuffed and mounted on a trolley.

Amongst the eccentric family members, mad friends and grudgingly loyal servants involved are Hubert, Henry's other (earthworm fixated) brother, the eternally knitting Aunt Florrie, the tapeworm-obsessed Mrs. E, Lady Philippa of Staines (Liz Smith), who enjoys the odd 'small' sherry and the ever-present Old Scrotum, Sir Henry's wrinkled retainer.

== Cast ==
- Trevor Howard as Sir Henry Rawlinson
- Patrick Magee as Slodden
- Denise Coffey as Mrs E
- Vivian Stanshall as Hubert Rawlinson/ Narrator/ voice of Humbert Rawlinson's ghost
- Sheila Reid as Florrie Rawlinson/ voice of Mother Rawlinson's ghost
- Suzanne Danielle as Candice Rawlinson
- J. G. Devlin as Old Scrotum
- Gary Waldhorn as Max
- Daniel Gerroll as Ralph Rawlinson
- Ben Aris as Lord Tarquin of Staines
- Liz Smith as Lady Philippa
- Harry Fowler as Buller Bullethead
- Michael Crane as Humbert Rawlinson
- Simon Jones as Joachim
- Jeremy Child as Peregrin Maynard
- Talfryn Thomas as Teddy Tidy
- Ian McDiarmid as Reg Smeeton

== Press ==
- 'It's impossible to do justice to the film's arrant and quite unique lunacy.' – The Financial Times
- 'Sir Henry is a comic masterpiece.' – NME
- 'This extraordinary film is one of the most haphazard British comedies I've seen. It is also a long time since I've laughed so much... a cult in the making.' – The Guardian
- 'You'll laugh, you'll cry, you'll jab your eyes with fingers still trembling from the trauma of being made a child again. You'll jab your eyes just to check you've just seen what you think you've seen.... Sir Henry is a film to be experienced as closely and seriously and often as possible, a work of art that should sink under the skin and into the bones and do its good work like vitamins and (Captain Beefheart's) Trout Mask Replica. I can't recommend it highly enough so I won't even start. It's out there if you want it. And in here (tap skull and chest) whether you want it or not, Englander pig dog. A talking picture. And what could be more wonderful than that?' – Plan B
- 'It wouldn't be a million miles wide of the mark to call "Sir Henry at Rawlinson End" a missing link between Monty Python and "Withnail & I", but as the brainchild of Vivian Stanshall - pack leader of the Bonzo Dog Doo-Dah Band - it has a place in the pantheon of sophisticated English silliness all of its own.' ***** – Time Out
- 'Although it truly is in the grand wazoo of weird, the film remains surprisingly unknown and unscreened since its release in 1980. I remember a grainy VHS furtively passed around at school, and even this clear as a bell DVD version feels a bit naughty... The movie equivalent of cheese before bed, this film guarantees nightmares, but in a good way.' – The Big Issue
