= Desperate Men Theatre Company =

Street theatre company in the UK

Desperate Men
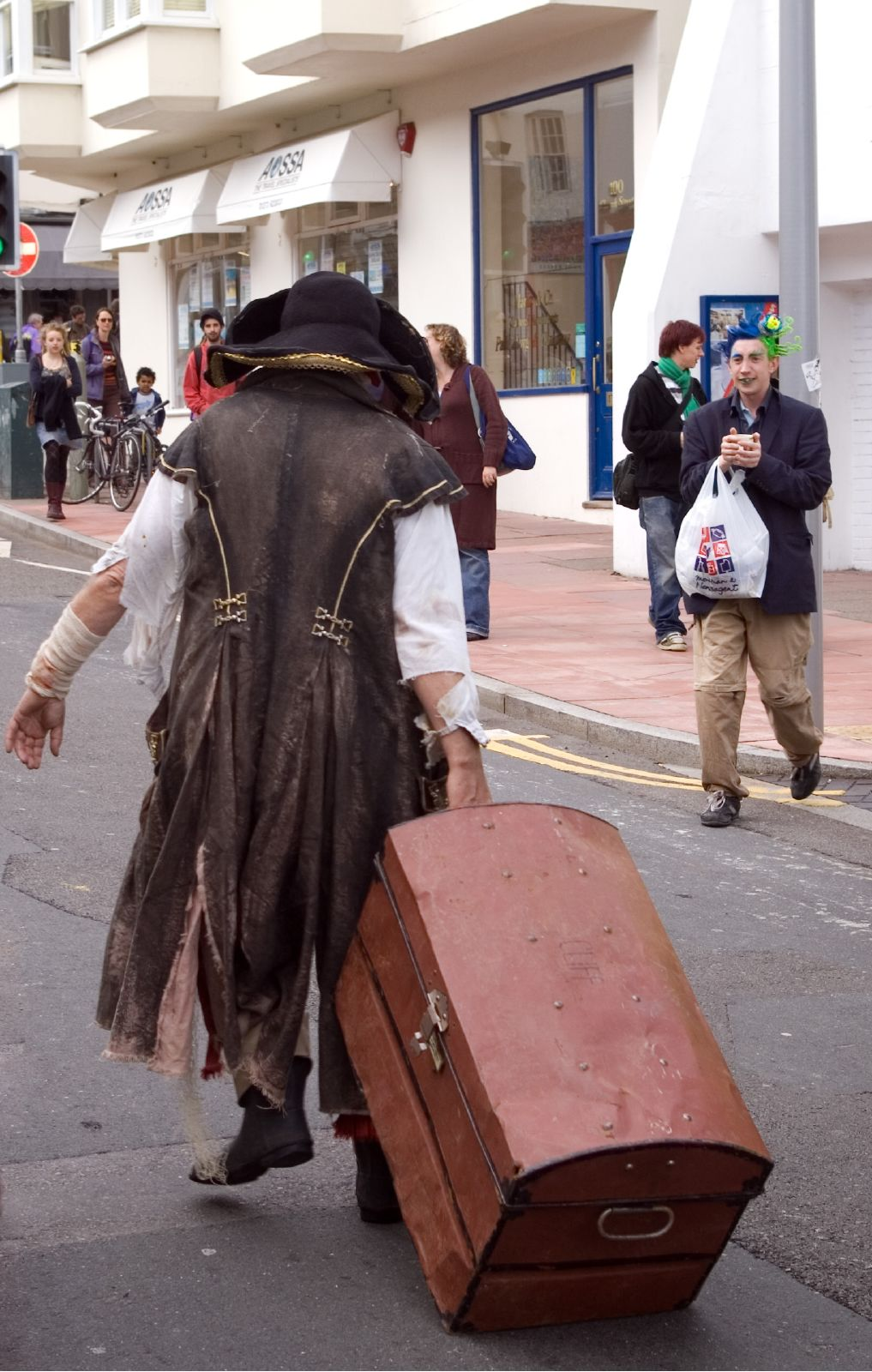
- Street theatre performance at the 2007 Brighton Festival
- Type: Theatrical troupe
- Industry: Street theatre
- Founded: January 1, 1980
- Area served: United Kingdom
- Key people: Richie Smith; Jon Beedell
- Website: desperatemen.com

Desperate Men Theatre Company is a street theatre company founded by Richie Smith and Jon Beedell in 1980, and is the UK's longest-running street theatre company. Now based in Bristol, England, the company aims to produce original, accessible comic theatre, and offers a variety of street animations, bespoke work, and creative consultancy.

In 1985, Smith and Beedell appeared in Vivian Stanshall and Ki Longfellow-Stanshall's Old Profanity Showboat production of Stinkfoot, a Comic Opera. Smith played the part of Buster and Beedell played Screwy. Richard Smith reprised his role in the 1988 London production at the Bloomsbury Theatre.

Desperate Men have a history of producing work that deals with social and environmental issues, such as littering – the Rubbish Heads, recycling – Eco-Pirates and the bicentenary of Charles Darwin's birth – Darwin and the Dodo. In 2007 they were artistic leaders on the Severn Project, one of the UK's largest outdoor arts projects.

Desperate Men have also worked internationally, including in Beirut and in Hong Kong. They also developed a project as part of the 2012 Cultural Olympiad in the South-West of England, and featured in the 2014 and 2016 Wye Valley River Festivals.

The name 'Desperate Men' comes from a poem by John Donne – 'Thou art slave to fate, chance, kings, and desperate men...'
