= Scott Sanders (director) =

American screenwriter and director

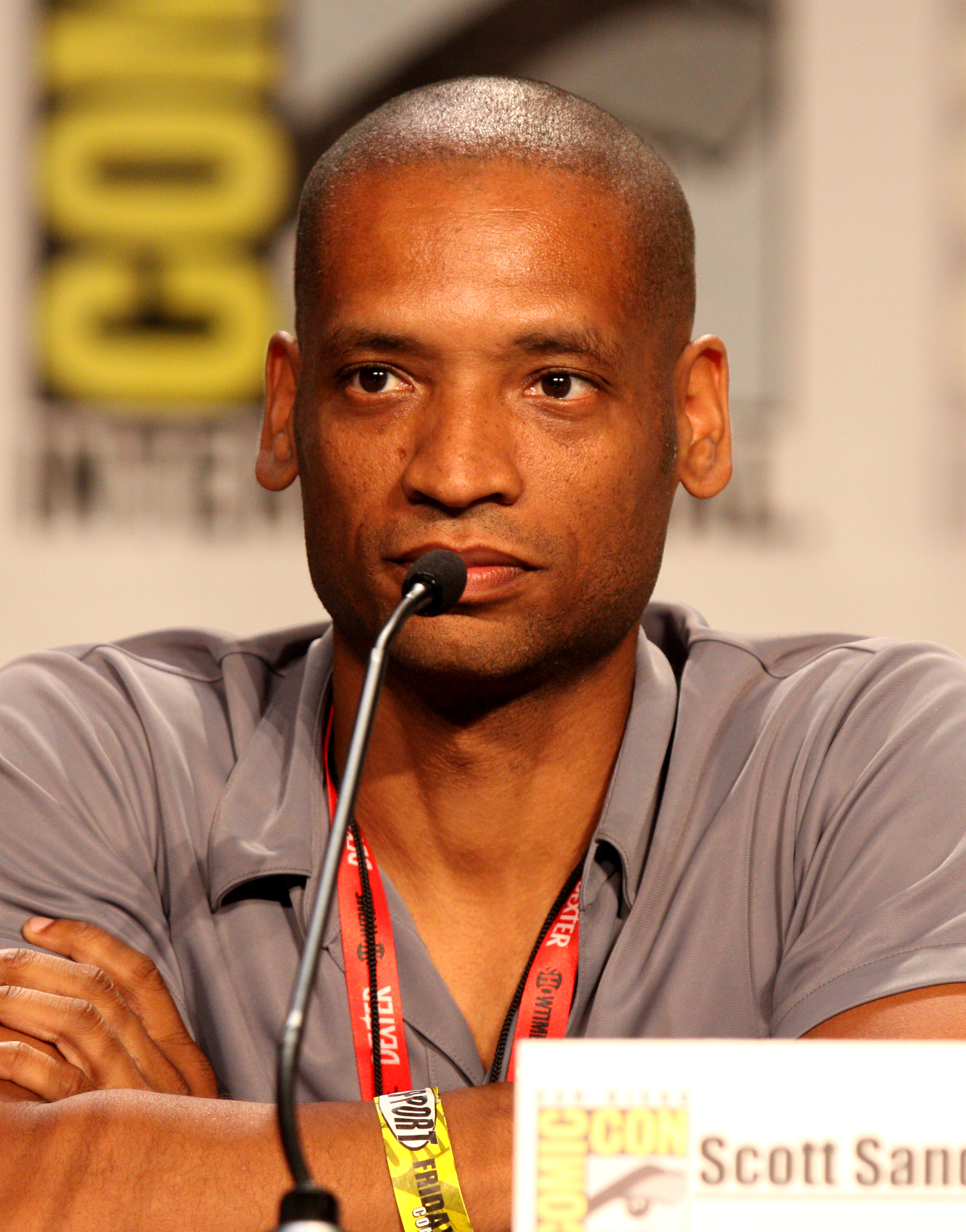
- Scott Sanders at San Diego Comic-Con in July 2011.
- Born: June 10, 1968 (age 58); Elizabeth City, North Carolina, United States
- Education: The University of North Carolina at Chapel Hill
- Occupations: Screenwriter, writer, film director
- Known for: Black Dynamite; Thick as Thieves

Scott Sanders (born June 10, 1968) is an American screenwriter and film director. He is best known for his work on the films Black Dynamite and Thick as Thieves.

== Early life ==
Sanders was born in Elizabeth City, North Carolina and raised in Washington, DC. His mother is Mrs. Estelle "Bunny" Sanders, the current mayor of Roper, North Carolina and a member of the UNC Board of Governors. His father, John Thomas Sanders (deceased), was an employee of IBM and also owned and operated a popular D.C. area barbecue pit, Scott's BBQ, which he named after his son. Scott's BBQ was a popular eatery for local politicians; regular patrons included Thurgood Marshall and Walter Mondale.

Sanders attended Sidwell Friends School where he graduated in 1986. He attended the University of North Carolina at Chapel Hill, graduating in 1991 with a degree in radio, TV, and Motion Pictures.

One of Scott's closest childhood friends is actor Ben Shenkman. He went to middle school with Saturday Night Live cast member Ana Gasteyer; they had a scene together in a 7th-grade production of the play Auntie Mame.

== Career ==
=== Television ===
Sanders first job upon arrival in Hollywood was working at United Talent Agency. When he was fired from that job, he started writing a spec script for a television show which led to him getting signed and becoming a television writer for TV shows such as A Different World, Roc, and The Wayans Brothers. He also did a commercial for Motorola.

=== Thick as Thieves ===
Sanders' film directorial debut came in 1998 with Thick as Thieves, starring Alec Baldwin, Michael Jai White, Rebecca De Mornay, and Janeane Garofalo. Based on the novel of the same name by Patrick Quinn, the film was adapted for the screen by Sanders and Arthur Krystal. It premiered at the 1998 Sundance Film Festival and was distributed by HBO. One reviewer noted "the distinctive contribution of young, gifted writer-director Scott Sanders."

=== Black Dynamite ===
Black Dynamite premiered at the 2009 Sundance Film Festival and was picked up for distribution by Sony Pictures Entertainment for worldwide distribution. Scott Sanders directed the film and co-wrote the screenplay along with its star Michael Jai White and Byron Minns. One critic described Black Dynamite as, "Scott Saunders' wickedly silly '70s-style blaxploitation spoof…that's intentionally and often delightfully shlocky; not to mention murky-looking as if its been sitting on shelf for a few decades."

In addition to Sundance, Black Dynamite appeared in many film festivals throughout 2009, including Seattle International, Tribeca, Karlovy Vary International, Munich, Edinburgh International, Copenhagen Film Festival, Melbourne International, and Deauville American. At the 2009 Seattle International Film Festival, Black Dynamite won the 2009 Golden Space Needle Award for Best Film. Black Dynamite was released by Sony Pictures on October 16, 2009.

Sanders and others adapted Black Dynamite as an animated series for the Cartoon Network's Adult Swim. The animated Black Dynamite ran for two seasons from 2012 to 2014.

=== Aztec Warrior ===
In 2012, Sanders directed the comedy-action film Aztec Warrior starring Luis Guzman as a washed-up Lucha Libre wrestler who comes out of retirement. The script was co-written by Sanders and Don Handfield, based on a story. Aztec Warrior was expected to be released in 2013, but "details on the Lionsgate project have been mum: production got underway in June of 2012, there is no release date and not much news in the in what should have been its year of release."

== Personal life ==
Sanders lives in Los Angeles, California. In addition to writing and directing, he is also a popular Los Angeles DJ, spinning under the name Suckapunch.

== Filmography ==
As writer/director:

- Thick as Thieves (1999)
- Black Dynamite (2009)
- Black Dynamite (TV series, 2012–2014)
- Aztec Warrior (unreleased)
