= As Good as Dead =

As Good as Dead may refer to:

- As Good as Dead (1995 film), an American television thriller directed by Larry Cohen
- As Good as Dead (2010 film), an American crime thriller directed by Jonathan Mossek
- As Good as Dead (2022 film), a Mexican action crime film directed by R. Ellis Frazier
- As Good as Dead (album), by Local H, 1996
- City Morgue Vol 2: As Good as Dead, an album by City Morgue, 2019
- As Good as Dead, a 2021 Good Girl's Guide to Murder novel by Holly Jackson
