= Ki Longfellow =

American writer

- Longfellow in 2007
- Born: Baby Kelly; December 9, 1944; Staten Island, New York, United States
- Died: June 12, 2022 (aged 77)
- Occupations: Writer; screenwriter; playwright; theatre director
- Spouse: Vivian Stanshall (m. 1980; died 1995)
- Writing career
- Period: 1980s to 2022
- Genre: Fiction
- Subject: Varied
- Website: www.kilongfellow.com

Ki Longfellow (born Baby Kelly, formerly Pamela Kelly; December 9, 1944 – June 12, 2022) was an American novelist, playwright, theatrical producer, theatre director and entrepreneur with dual citizenship in Britain. She is best known in the United States for her novel The Secret Magdalene (2005). This is the first of her works exploring the divine feminine. In England, she is likely best known as the widow of Vivian Stanshall, musician, lead singer of the Bonzo Dog Doo-Dah Band, songwriter, author, radio broadcaster and wit.

The first of her novels to be published, China Blues (1989) and Chasing Women (1993) are mysteries and thrillers. In April 2013, the first of her Sam Russo Mysteries was published, part of a noir series set in and around New York City in the late 1940s. The fourth in the Sam Russo Mysteries was published in 2015. Walks Away Woman, about a neglected Arizona housewife walking out into the Sonoran Desert to die, was published in December 2013. On January 26, 2018, Longfellow's memoir of her husband,The Illustrated Vivian Stanshall, a Fairytale of Grimm Art, illustrated by Ben Wickey, was published.

== Early life and education ==
Longfellow was born as Baby Kelly on December 9, 1944, on Staten Island, New York to Andrea Lorraine Kelly, who was barely sixteen years old (born November 17, 1928). The young mother finally named the child "Pamela" when required to by the US Vital Records Office, then put her baby in foster care while she worked at many jobs during the last of the war years. When the infant Pamela contracted pneumonia, she was removed from the foster home. The girl was taken in by a relative of her mother's father. Pamela was removed from this "home" when it was discovered this relative's husband was abusive. Pamela was never told about her biological father until she was 27; she was told only that he was Native American but never learned his name.

Within two years Kelly, briefly assuming care of her child, left New York to resettle in Marin County, California, near her older married sister, Rosemarie Anderson. In Marin, Anderson cared for Pamela, until she left for Samoa, then to Texas with her own child and new husband, recently returned from World War II. She turned the girl back to her mother.

Kelly met and married a US Navy sailor named Clifford Longfellow, claiming Pamela again at the age of four. He adopted her and she took his surname. Over the next several years, the family moved frequently, as he was assigned to New York's Brooklyn Navy Yard, Hawaii's Pearl Harbor, Mare Island and Long Beach in California, and Norfolk Naval Base in Virginia. Due to frequent moves, Longfellow attended a different school for each grade except the years spent on Oahu. Between duty stations, the family lived with her adopted grandfather, Lindsay Ray Longfellow, at his home in Larkspur, California. Pamela relied on him for "family," and learned to enjoy his pastime of going to horse races.

Longfellow graduated from Redwood High School in Larkspur. In her junior and senior years, she attended only those classes that interested her and cut others. Determined to become a writer, she spent time with painters, poets, and musicians in Sausalito, and discovered what remained of the Beat Generation in the North Beach section of San Francisco.

At nineteen, Longfellow had a dramatic experience which she now considers an occurrence of gnosis. Not understanding her experience then and suffering panic attacks, she voluntarily entered the State Mental Institution at Napa, California. There she was diagnosed, without benefit of a doctor, as a "severe psycho-neurotic."

== Children, marriages, family and early work ==
On June 21, 1963, at age eighteen, Longfellow gave birth to her first child, daughter Sydney Longfellow (who became a painter and photographer as an adult). In 1964 she acted in her only movie, Once a Thief (starring Alain Delon and directed by Ralph Nelson), in a part written for her by her close friend, the film's screenwriter Zekial Marko. In 1967 she moved with her daughter to New York City, where she worked briefly as a fashion model, and then as a writer for CARE. She moved to Montana, where she lived and worked for a year on a ranch on the Blackfeet Indian Reservation as a member of Volunteers in Service to America. She sailed to Europe, living for a time in Nice and Paris.

Back in New York City, Longfellow worked for the promoter Bill Graham in his Millard Booking Agency. In 1972, she met Robin Gee, the manager of the English folk band Fairport Convention, and moved with him to England. They were together for five years and she became a British citizen. During this period, Longfellow wrote occasionally for English music magazines.

A year before her mother died suddenly at the age of 44 from an embolism, Kelly told Longfellow, then 27 years old, for the first time about her biological father; he was a Native American of Iroquois ancestry. Kelly had met him at art school but never told Pamela his name or that of the school. Longfellow never met him nor could she find him. Longfellow returned to California in 1975 and stayed there for a time.

In 1977, she flew back to England. There she met Vivian Stanshall, frontman for the Bonzo Dog Band. In 1977, they moved into a houseboat moored on the River Thames between Chertsey and Shepperton. On August 16, 1979, they had a daughter, Silky Longfellow-Stanshall, named after a favorite racehorse from Longfellow's childhood. On September 9, 1981 they married in the register office at Sunbury-on-Thames.

== Music and plays ==
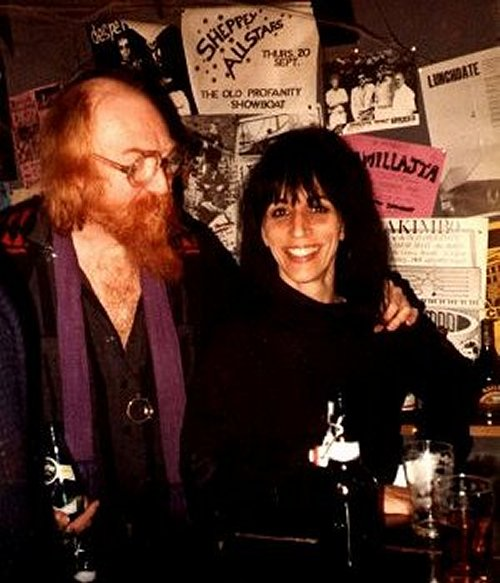
Longfellow with Vivian Stanshall in the hold of the Thekla

Longfellow and Stanshall wrote radio plays and songs together. In 1980, she edited Stanshall's only book, Sir Henry at Rawlinson End & Other Spots, published by Pete Townshend, of Eel Pie Publishing. She also helped Stanshall with the script for the film version of Sir Henry at Rawlinson End, which starred Trevor Howard.

In late 1982, Longfellow discovered The Thekla, a ship she rescued and renovated with government funding. She moored it in the port of Bristol, where she adapted it as a theatre and restaurant. She hoped this would provide refuge for her hard-drinking, Valium-addicted, husband. The restaurant failed, but the theatre thrived and also built a reputation as a music venue. In late 1984, Stanshall joined her on the Old Profanity Showboat.

In 1985, Stanshall and Longfellow wrote, produced, and staged their Stinkfoot, a Comic Opera aboard the Thekla. The orchestra was made up of local musicians and street buskers. The show received excellent reviews. Later the popular opera was transferred to London's West End, where it was partly financed by Stephen Fry. Perhaps because the Stanshalls were not involved, it was not a financial success. In 2004, Sea Urchin Editions published the script of the original Stinkfoot, with an introduction by Longfellow. In 2010, it was produced in Bristol in a concert version.

In 1986, Longfellow and Stanshall closed the theatre and moved into the Bristol home of their friend, actor David Rappaport. Stanshall returned alone to London after the turn of the year, while Longfellow recuperated from an illness brought on by overwork and stress. The couple lived apart until Stanshall's death in March 1995.

== Writing career ==
Longfellow began writing in earnest. Her first novel was China Blues (1989), a historical thriller set in San Francisco's Chinatown in 1923. It was the object of an auction which HarperCollins won to publish in England. Doubleday, New York published an American edition in 1990. China Blues was subsequently translated into Spanish, Swedish, Hebrew, Czech, German, and optioned by Richard D. Zanuck and David Brown.

The process of attempting to adapt her novels as films taught Longfellow a great deal about the mainstream movie business. Longfellow's second book Chasing Women (1993) was a comedy murder mystery set in New York City immediately after the Great Crash of 1929. It was also published in England by HarperCollins Grafton imprint. Later in the mid 1990s it was optioned by an Australian team of female writer/producers for a feature film. After working for over two years on the screenplay, this project was abandoned. In late 2017, one half of the team (now part of a production company called Faraway Films) sought out Chasing Women again, having never forgotten it. In the process of optioning this book for the second time, Faraway Films discovered three other novels by Longfellow (China Blues, Walks Away Woman and Houdini Heart) and asked for and was granted a four-book deal. All four books are now in active pre-production.

From mid-1990, when she was very ill with pneumonia, until the death of her husband in March 1995, Longfellow divided her time between a small farm in Brattleboro, Vermont and Stanshall's flat in Muswell Hill, London. She and their daughter Silky hoped that Stanshall would end his destructive habits and they could reunite as a family.

After Stanshall's accidental death in a fire in 1995, Longfellow stopped writing for a time. When she slowly got back to work, she found a new "voice" very different from the one expressed in her earlier works. As a widow, her work grappled with loss of her husband, her difficult childhood, and spiritual yearning. She claimed to have realised that her experience at age 19 was an event of gnosis.

Once widowed, Longfellow published by the first name of "Ki" (pronounced as in "sky"), a name which Stanshall had given her from a vivid dream he had while living on the Searchlight. Based on her novel, The Secret Magdalene, she was invited to contribute to Dan Burstein's non-fiction book Secrets of Mary Magdalene (2006).

Her novel, The Secret Magdalene (2005) has been translated into Spanish, Czech, Chinese, Icelandic, Hebrew and French. It was optioned in 2014 to be adapted as a feature film by director Nancy Savoca. The book remains with Savoca to date (2022).

Longfellow's novel, Flow Down Like Silver, (Hypatia of Alexandria) (2009), is about the 4th/5th-century mathematician and philosopher who lived in Egypt. It is the second volume in her trilogy on the Divine Feminine or Shakti. As of 2020 it has been translated into French.

She rewrote the script for Stinkfoot, a Comic Opera, to be staged in Bristol, England, cutting it to two hours. Peter Moss served as musical director. (At the same time she was working on her first nonfiction, a memoir of her married life called, The Last Showboat, an Illustrated Memoir of Vivian Stanshall, the Old Profanity Showboat, & Stinkfoot, a Comic Opera.)

A Stinkfoot Showcase played the Thekla in Bristol on July 20, 21, 22nd and 24, 2010. This was a concert showcase of Stinkfoot's songs backed by a full band and selected cast members (including Nikki Lamborn and Vivian and Ki's daughter Silky Longfellow-Stanshall) plus Tony Slattery as narrator and singer. It attracted the attention of major press (The Word magazine, Mojo magazine, BBC London & BBC Bristol), and theatres such as the Bristol Old Vic. She is seeking funding to restage the original work.

The concert was to be adapted as an animated film, entitled The Last Showboat (in pre-production as of 2013), based on the history of the Old Profanity Showboat and the Stanshalls. (As of 2020 this has not been completed.)

Longfellow published Houdini Heart (2011), a horror/psychological thriller. In 2012 the Horror Writers Association announced that Houdini Heart was on the shortlist for the Bram Stoker Award for "Outstanding Achievement in a Novel", 2011.

In February 2012, Eio Books redesigned and reissued Longfellow's first published novel, China Blues. It was optioned in the fall of 2013 as either a television series or a mini-series. In 2018, its 2013 option expired, it was optioned again as a "high end' mini-series by the production team behind Faraway Films.

In early April 2013, Longfellow published her first three titles in a series of murder mysteries featuring Sam Russo, a private eye in 1940s Staten Island, New York. These are in the noir tradition. In 2015, her fourth Sam Russo book came out.

In December 2013, Longfellow published Walks Away Woman, a novel she had written in 2002 when she was living in Tucson, Arizona. It explores a middle-aged woman who walks into the desert, having given up on her life.

On January 26, 2018, Longfellow's long-awaited memoir/biography/art book about her husband, Vivian Stanshall, was published by Eio Books: The Illustrated Vivian Stanshall, a Fairytale of Grimm Art, illustrated by Ben Wickey.

== Death ==
Longfellow died on June 12, 2022.

== Books ==
- 1989 – China Blues (as Pamela Longfellow) – HarperCollins (Britain) ISBN 978-0-586-20390-3, Doubleday (US) ISBN 978-0-385-26048-0
- 1993 – Chasing Women (as Pamela Longfellow) – HarperCollins (Britain) ISBN 978-0-246-13677-0
- 2003 – Stinkfoot: An English Comic Opera (as Ki Longfellow-Stanshall, with Vivian Stanshall) – Sea Urchin Editions (English language, Netherlands) ISBN 978-90-75342-13-0
- 2005 – The Secret Magdalene – (as Ki Longfellow) Eio Books (worldwide) ISBN 978-0-9759255-3-9
- 2006 – Secrets of Mary Magdalene – (contributing writer) CDS Books ISBN 1-59315-205-1
- 2007 – The Secret Magdalene – Crown (Random House, English language world rights) ISBN 978-0-307-34666-7
- 2009 – Flow Down Like Silver, Hypatia of Alexandria, a novel – Eio Books (worldwide) ISBN 978-0-9759255-9-1
- 2011 – Houdini Heart, (Eio Books, April 2011) ISBN 978-0-9759255-1-5
- 2012 – China Blues, a reissue by (Eio Books, Feb. 2012) ISBN 978-0-9759255-7-7 (being developed as a television series.)
- 2013 – Shadow Roll, a Sam Russo Mystery (Case 1) – Eio Books (worldwide) ISBN 978-1937819002
- 2013 – Good Dog, Bad Dog, a Sam Russo Mystery (Case 2) – Eio Books (worldwide) ISBN 978-1937819040
- 2013 – The Girl in the Next Room, a Sam Russo Mystery (Case 3) – Eio Books (worldwide) ISBN 978-1937819057
- 2013 – Walks Away Woman – Eio Books (worldwide) ISBN 978-1937819903
- 2014 - The Last Great Pulp Fiction Writer - North Beach Girl/Scandal on the Sand (contributing writer) Stark House Press ISBN 978-1933586557
- 2015 - Dead on the Rocks (Case 4) - Eio Books (worldwide) ISBN 978-1937819125
- 2018 - The Illustrated Vivian Stanshall, a Fairytale of Grimm Art - Eio Books (worldwide) ISBN 978-0975925584

== Movies ==
- 1965 – Once a Thief, actress
- 1978 – Sir Henry at Rawlinson End, Charisma Films, screenwriter
- 2007 – The Secret Magdalene, (optioned in 2014)
- 2010 – Stinkfoot, a Comic Opera, playwright, (pre-production in 2012)
- 2017 - Chasing Women was optioned by Faraway Films based in both Australia and Los Angeles
- 2018 - China Blues, Walks Away Woman and Houdini Heart have also been optioned by Faraway Films

== Theatre ==
- Stinkfoot, a Comic Opera, staged in Bristol, England and London, England, (revived in concert version in 2010)
