= The Secret Magdalene =

2005 book by Ki Longfellow

- First edition Random House cover.
- Author: Ki Longfellow
- Language: English
- Genre: Feminist novels, Alternate history, Historical novels, Mystery fiction, Metafiction
- Publisher: Eio Books
- Publication date: 1761 (original); March 2005
- Publication place: United States
- Media type: Print (Hardcover & Paperback)
- Pages: 448 pp
- ISBN: 978-0-307-34666-7
- OCLC: 156691502
- Dewey Decimal: 813/.6 22
- LC Class: PS3612.O533 S43 2007 (to be reclassed to PS3562.O499)
- Preceded by: China Blues; Chasing Women; Stinkfoot: An English Comic Opera
- Followed by: Flow Down Like Silver: Hypatia of Alexandria; Houdini Heart; Walks Away Woman; The Illustrated Vivian Stanshall, a Fairytale of Grimm Art

The Secret Magdalene, American writer Ki Longfellow's third book, was published in 2005. The historical novel presents a different view of events chronicled in the New Testament, specifically the ministry of Jesus Christ and his relationship to Mary Magdalene. It is told entirely in the first-person voice of Mariamne.

A hardback edition was published by Random House in 2006, followed by a trade paperback edition published by Three Rivers Press, a Random House imprint, in December 2007. It has been translated into several languages, including Spanish, Czech, Chinese, French and Icelandic. It is a tale of Mariamne's quest to understand the gnosis she experienced as a child.

Longfellow said she based the book on her studies of translations of historic Jewish and Arabic texts, as well as on modern Biblical scholarship. A selected bibliography is included.

== Plot summary ==
The story begins in the voice of the Jewess Mariamne as a child living a privileged life in her widowed father Josephus' home in Jerusalem. Also living with them is her father's Egyptian ward, Salome, the daughter of a deceased fellow merchant. Both girls are overseen by a body servant named Tata. Mariamne has just recovered from a life-threatening illness. When she revives, she is gifted (or cursed) with unexpected voiced divination. Raised like sisters and indulged by a fond father with books and lessons usually only accorded boys, Mariamne and Salome possess a thirst for knowledge, both secular and magical, that is forbidden to females. Through their devoted personal slave, they also learn worldly experience far beyond anything Josephus, a member of the elite Jewish Sanhedrin (court), would approve.

When Mariamne reveals her gift of prophecy in front of her father and his house guest, a merchant named Ananias, Josephus sends her out of the room, but Ananias is intrigued. Within months Josephus, misunderstanding an exchange he sees between Salome and his guest, banishes both from his home and, hours later, Mariamne and her servant Tata. His daughter has to go to her uncle's strict Jewish household, where she is allowed no books. Unable to bear the loss of Salome and her books, Mariamne decides to leave. She and Tata follow Salome into banishment. Mariamne is eleven years old; Salome is twelve.

For protection and ease of travel, Mariamne and Salome disguise themselves as boys. Dressed as males, they take male names: Salome is Simon; Mariamne is John. Ananias and his friends take the boys to the “Wilderness,” a hidden settlement on the northwest edge of the Dead Sea. They meet a man who will become Mariamne's mentor, the young philosopher Seth of Damascus, also a seeker of divine knowledge. They meet John the Baptist, hiding with other zealots in deserts. In the "Wilderness," they see evidence of the struggle for Jewish freedom from Rome, and the even more complex struggle for the Temple, where Roman-backed priests practice rites of animal sacrifice that enrage zealots. They learn there are many kinds of zealots, though all await a Messiah to lead them. Salome comes to believe John the Baptist is that Messiah and a king of the Jews. Mariamne does not agree. Their differences increase after Mariamne meets John's cousin, a Galilean called Yeshua.

With Seth, they travel to Alexandria, Egypt where Mariamne and Salome live in the Great Library, becoming learned in mathematics, philosophy, and poetry. Under the tutelage of Philo of Alexandria, they learn the Egyptian mysteries, specifically the ancient passion of the man-god Osiris.

After seven years, Mariamne reluctantly returns to the Wilderness, but Salome is eager to return to see John the Baptist. They continue their disguise as males. Having lived as males, they remain males. Through John of the River, Mariamne (now called John the Less) meets his cousin, Yeshua of Galilee and his twin brother, Jude the Sicarii.

John the Less shares with Yeshua knowledge from her studies in Egypt. Deeply confused and disturbed by the violent actions of those around him, and their expectations of a "king", Yeshua retreats into the true wilderness of the Dead Sea region. He returns to share his revelation with his beloved friend, John the Less. Mariamne had undergone her own experience of gnosis years earlier and no longer recounts it, but Yeshua is filled with a messianic fervor to share his sense that all are divine. Mariamne (now John the Beloved Disciple) follows Yeshua as he teaches and heals, spreading his message of love and forgiveness to his followers, whose numbers continue to grow.

Eventually, Yeshua's conviction leads him to the cross. Mariamne leaves Palestine for the south of France, then called the Gallia Narbonensis. Dying in a cave, she tells her story to Seth of Damascus, who writes it all down for her.

== Themes ==
Feminism is a thread that runs through the book.

== Historical accuracy ==
Throughout The Secret Magdalene, Longfellow weaves historical facts and personages in her own interpretation of the Christ story. Longfellow said she based her choice of name for her lead character on the Nag Hammadi Papers, a collection of ancient Gnostic material found in 1945 in Egypt. All editions of the book include a comprehensive though selected bibliography of materials used by Longfellow.

The novel has been praised by some theologians and historians but was not reviewed in any major newspapers or journals. Seekers of Mary Magdalene have commented on its reflection of the daily life of the times, as well as the known historical personages it depicts. According to Bookreporter, "this is an imaginative novel that undoubtedly will attract a lot of attention and foster discussion about one of the most controversial and fascinating women in early Church history."

In June 2010, the book made Online Classes' list of "100 All Time Best Historical Fiction Books".

== Parallels of author's life to the novel ==
The central idea of the book is the realization of gnosis, a Greek word meaning divine knowledge. At the age of nineteen, Longfellow had a sudden and spontaneous awakening to "All That Is". She wrote The Secret Magdalene to explore this experience through her novel.

== Analysis ==
The novel makes use of the New Testament context in order to explore a variety of philosophical, religious, and spiritual themes. It questions the meaning and significance of the Jewish tradition, Hellenistic influences, early Gnosticism, and other ancient philosophical teachings, including the mystery religions that were widespread in the ancient world.

== Film adaptations ==
Writer and film director Nancy Savoca, and her husband, film producer Rich Guay, bought the film rights of the Eio edition. Savoca is an independent film-maker whose first film won the Grand Jury Prize at the Sundance Film Festival. According to Longfellow's Web site in late 2021 the adaptation of The Secret Magdalene was in pre-production.
