= Trouble Man =

Trouble Man may refer to

- Trouble Man (1972 film), a blaxploitation film
- Trouble Man (album), the film soundtrack album by Marvin Gaye
- "Trouble Man" (song), a song composed and written by Marvin Gaye and the theme for the film
- Trouble Man (2025 film), an American action comedy film
- "Trouble Man", a song sung by Waylon Jennings on his 1988 album Full Circle
- Trouble Man: Heavy Is the Head, a 2012 album by American rapper T.I.
- "Trouble Man", a song from the 1949 Anderson–Weill musical Lost in the Stars (1949 musical)
- Trouble Man, a 2010 album by Robert Aaron
