= Arthur Krystal =

American writer and editor, born 1947

Arthur Krystal (born December 12, 1947, in Stockholm, Sweden) is an American essayist, editor, and screenwriter living in New York City.

== Early life and education ==
Krystal's parents, Shloime and Mila Krystal, both from Warsaw, Poland, survived World War II in Russia and immigrated to the United States in 1952. He attended the Bronx High School of Science from 1963 to 1965, the University of Wisconsin–Madison from 1965 to 1969, and Columbia University in 1970.

After working at a series of jobs, he became a part-time editor at Basic Books in New York City.

== Career ==
Krystal has written for publications including The American Scholar, Harper's Magazine, The New Yorker, The New York Times Book Review, The Times Literary Supplement, The Wall Street Journal, The Chronicle of Higher Education, The Washington Post Book World, New York Newsday, The Village Voice, The New Criterion, the Los Angeles Review of Books, Sports Illustrated, Art & Antiques, the Encyclopædia Britannica, and Collier's Encyclopedia.

His first book of essays, Agitations: Essays on Life and Literature (2002) was a finalist for the 2003 PEN Award for the "Art of the Essay". The essay "When Writers Speak", which appeared in The New York Times Book Review, was included in The Best American Essays 2010, edited by Christopher Hitchens.

Many of Krystal's essays have stirred up controversy for their insistence that intellectual work not be limited or defined by sociopolitical concerns when executed in good faith.

Krystal co-wrote the HBO film Thick as Thieves (1999) and wrote the documentary Secrets of the Code (2006).

== Bibliography ==
=== Books ===
- This Thing We Call Literature. Oxford University Press. 2016.
- Except When I Write: Reflections of a Recovering Critic. Oxford University Press. 2011.
- The Half-Life of an American Essayist. David R. Godine, Publisher. 2007
- Agitations: Essays on Life and Literature. Yale University Press. 2002.
- Some Unfinished Chaos: The Lives of F. Scott Fitzgerald. University of Virginia Press. 2023. ISBN 9780813950617.

=== As editor ===
- A Company of Readers: Uncollected Writings of W. H. Auden, Jacques Barzun, and Lionel Trilling from The Reader's Subscription and Mid-Century Book Clubs. The Free Press. 2001.
- Jacques Barzun, The Culture We Deserve. Wesleyan University Press. 1989.

=== Selected essays ===
- "Closing the Books" (Harper's Magazine, March 1996), recounting Krystal's disaffection with reading, generated many irate responses and was the occasion of a lecture by Sven Birkerts at the New York Public Library (May 1, 1996): "The Time of Reading: A meditation on the fate of books in an impatient age".
- "H. C. Witwer and Me" (The American Scholar, Spring 1998). Reprinted in Rereadings: Seventeen Writers Revisit Books They Love, edited by Anne Fadiman (Farrar Straus & Giroux, 2005).
- "Who Speaks for the Lazy?" (The New Yorker, April 26 & May 3, 1999) was a clarion call to those who find it hard to get any work done. Reprinted in The New Gilded Age: The New Yorker Looks at the Culture of Affluence, edited by David Remnick (New York: Random House, 2000)
- "Why Smart People Believe in God" (The American Scholar, Fall, 2001) anticipating the "New Atheism" of the twenty-first century.
- "Easy Writers" (The New Yorker, May 28, 2012), a highly controversial piece about the distinctions between literature and genre fiction, elicited a notable response from Lev Grossman in Time magazine (May 23, 2012): "Literary Revolution in the Supermarket Aisle: Genre Fiction Is Disruptive Technology: How science fiction, fantasy, romance, mysteries and all the rest will take over the world".
- "What is Literature" (Harper's Magazine, March 2014) took issue with A New Literary History of America, edited by Greil Marcus and Werner Sollors, and came down firmly on the side of the literary canon while recognizing the socio-cultural biases that inform it.
- "The Shrinking World of Ideas" (The Chronicle of Higher Education, November 28, 2014) or how postmodernism and neuroscience have influenced the teaching of the humanities.
- "Is Cultural Appropriation Ever Appropriate?" (Los Angeles Review of Books, July 15, 2017) questioned the validity of the debate itself.
