= Thick as Thieves (1999 film) =

- Film poster
- Directed by: Scott Sanders
- Written by: Scott Sanders; Arthur Krystal
- Based on: Thick as Thieves by Patrick Quinn
- Produced by: Jon Steingart; Glenn Zoller; Donald Zuckerman
- Starring: Alec Baldwin; Andre Braugher; Michael Jai White; Rebecca De Mornay
- Cinematography: Christopher Walling
- Edited by: John Pace
- Music by: Christophe Beck
- Distributed by: Rogue Pictures; October Films
- Release date: January 28, 1999 (Sundance Film Festival)
- Running time: 93 minutes
- Country: United States
- Language: English

Thick as Thieves is a 1999 American crime film based on the novel of the same name by Patrick Quinn and adapted for the screen by Scott Sanders and Arthur Krystal, with Sanders directing. The film stars Alec Baldwin, Andre Braugher, Michael Jai White, Bruce Greenwood and Rebecca De Mornay.

== Premise ==
The film follows an escalating vendetta between professional Chicago thief Mackin (Alec Baldwin) and rising Detroit kingpin Pointy Williams (Michael Jai White) after an attempted double cross.

== Cast ==
- Alec Baldwin as Mackin, "The Thief"
- Andre Braugher as Dink Reeves
- Michael Jai White as Pointy Williams
- Rebecca De Mornay as Det. Louise Petrone
- Ricky Harris as Rodney
- David Byrd as Sal Capetti
- Bruce Greenwood as Bo
- Richard Edson as Danny
- Robert Miano as Frank Riles
- Khandi Alexander as Janet Hussein
- Janeane Garofalo as Anne
- Jack McGee as Chief
- Nicole Pulliam as Cassandra
- Terrence Evans as Bus Driver
- Thomas Babuscio as Ray
- Michael Hitchcock as Maloney

== Casting ==
Actress Julia Sweeney is billed for a part that was cut from the film but remains credited; Although Sweeney is featured in a mid-credits scene (however only the audio from this sequence is featured).
