= Stinkfoot, a Comic Opera =

- Screwy (Jon Beedell) vs Soliquisto (Andy Black); Original Bristol performance
- Music: Vivian Stanshall
- Lyrics: Vivian Stanshall & Ki Longfellow-Stanshall
- Book: Ki Longfellow-Stanshall & Vivian Stanshall
- Basis: Ki Longfellow children's book Stinkfoot, the Cat
- Productions: 1985 Old Profanity Showboat Bristol, England; 1988 Bloomsbury Theatre revival

Stinkfoot, a Comic Opera is an English musical with book, music, and lyrics by Vivian Stanshall and Ki Longfellow-Stanshall written for the Crackpot Theatre Company aboard the Old Profanity Showboat in Bristol, England. The show is based on a series of tales written by Longfellow about Stinkfoot, a New York City alley cat. It had been intended for children, but when told by a New York City literary agent that "No mother in America would want her child identifying with Stinkfoot the alley cat, never mind its name," the story went into a drawer, and didn't reappear until 1985 when Vivian and Ki decided to base a musical on its lead character, Stinkfoot.

== Plot ==
The story concerns Soliquisto, a once great music hall artist, now reduced to playing small venues, and his former star, a cat called Stinkfoot. The cat disappeared nine years before the action of the play, and he is left with an act consisting of his nephew Buster and his other cat, Persian Moll.

== Productions ==
Stinkfoot was staged twice. Once in 1985 for the ship where it was produced by Longfellow and directed by Stanshall. Stanshall also designed the set, the costumes, the make-up, and even the hair. Pete Moss assumed the musical task completely for the second staging in 1988 at the Bloomsbury Theatre in London. The first production was a sell-out for its entire run and garnered wonderful national reviews. The second show (partly financed by friend Stephen Fry) also sold out, but without the participation of either Longfellow or Stanshall, as well as miscast, was a muddle of misdirection.

== Book ==
The entire script of the original Stinkfoot: An English Comic Opera with an introduction by Ki Longfellow-Stanshall and illustrations by Vivian Stanshall was published in 2003 by Sea Urchin Editions based in Rotterdam.

== Songs and music ==
Act I

- "Bad Bad Ways" – Persian Moll
- "Threnody: Stinkfoot is Drowned" – The Coastguard & Woeful Sirens
- "You Can't Confound a Flounder" – Isaiah
- "A Foundling's Song, or Born in a Bag" – Polly
- "Drowned Sailor's Dream" – Elma the Electrifying Elver
- "No Time Like the Future" – Isaiah & Polly
- "Ow! Ow! Wasn't I Good Tonight!" – Persian Moll
- "Quickchange Artiste" – Buster
- "Follow Your Nose" – Soliquisto
- "Sphinx & Minx" – Mrs. Bag Bag
- "Sharks of Mechanical Time" – Isaiah & Company
- "Cut My Hands" – Moll & Elma

Act II

- "The Meow Blues" – Persian Moll & Buster
- "Landing on my Feet Feet" – Stinkfoot
- "Imagination" – Polly
- "Parakeet to Meet You" – Polly & Company
- "See Me Sometime" – Persian Moll
- "What My Public Wants" – Soliquisto & Company
- "It's Wonderful What People Will Do" – Stinkfoot
- "Why Me Legs Won't Work" – Screwy
- "Murder Living Next Door" – Polly & Persian Moll
- "Only Being Myself" – Persian Moll
- "Drowned Sailor's Dream (Reprise)" – Elma & Woeful Sirens
- "Grand Finale/No Time Like The Future" – Entire Company

== Main characters, original cast ==
- The Great Soliquisto — Andy Black
- Stinkfoot — Steve Howe
- Screwy — Jon Beedell
- Buster — Richard Smith
- Persian Moll — (originally played by Nikki Lamborn of Never the Bride)
- Pollyanna, the Foundling Budgerigar – Cindy Stratton
- Mrs. Bag Bag – Sydney Longfellow (Ki's daughter)
- Isaiah, the Flounder – Pete Coggins
- Elma, the Electrifying Elver – Hirut Araya Bihon

In the original programme the cast list (in alphabetical order) is:

- Nikki B as Persian Moll, A Siren & The Left Half of Screwy's Brain;
- John Beedell as Screwy, The Ocean Liner and Chorus;
- Andy Black as Soliquisto, and The Partly Cooked Shrimp;
- Pete Coggins as Isaiah, the Coastguard & The Public;
- Hirut as Black Pearl and A Woeful Siren;
- Steve Howe as Stinkfoot, Drowned Sailor and the Balanced Nose;
- Tria Linning as Jellyfish, A Woeful Siren and Raggedy Alma;
- Sydney Longfellow as Mrs Bag Bag and A Woeful Siren;
- Richard Smith as Buster and The Giant Squid;
- Cindy Stratton as Big Polly, A Siren, The Right Half of Screwy's Brain;
- Lights: Paul Neville;
- Choreography: Vivian Stanshall and Tria Linning;
- Music director: Pete Watson;
- Costumes: Caroline Poland;
- Hair: Nikki B and James;
- Set and prop painting: Mark Millmore;
- Stage carpenter: Mike Wilson;
- Make-up: Helen and Julie-Anna.

== Secondary characters, original cast ==
- God — Vivian Stanshall
- The Giant Squid – Richard Smith
- The Ocean Liner – Jon Beedell
- The Angry Sea – The Company
- The Public – The Company led by Pete Coggins
- The Right & Left Sides of Screwy's Brain – Nikki Lamborn, left brain, Cindy Stratton, right brain
- The Partly Cooked Shrimp – Andy Black
- The Coastguard – Pete Coggins
- The Drowned Sailor – Steve Howe
- Three Woeful Sirens – Sydney Longfellow, Hirut Araya Bihon, Nikki Lamborn

== Critical reception ==
The Guardian theatre critic David Foote wrote in his review of the musical's opening night in Bristol, "Backed artistically by Pamela Ki Longfellow, Vivian has given us an offbeat Christmas show that is funny, bluesy, and loony…the marvel is that here is an original, unusual musical, smelling of the salt sea, with Coward, Cagney, and Mae West around to keep us happily buoyant."

The Times's theatre critic Richard Gilbert wrote of the Bristol opening, "...a watery tale set alternatively at the end of a seaside pier and under the ocean, peopled by an angst-ridden music hall artiste, his Faustian apprentice, a tomcat under the influence of James Cagney (Stinkfoot himself), a Mae Westian glamour-puss (Persian Moll) and an oracular ventriloquist's dummy, Screwy. Under the waves there is more derring-do from a cynical flounder, a giant squid and a partly cooked shrimp. The cast of local singers, fringe actors and musicians seems to have absorbed the complexities of the highly moral plot where regeneration triumphs over evil and all optimists ultimately defeat the pessimists. The story-line is less important than the ambitious and resonant songs and music. The length of the Old Profanity boat is cunningly exploited by the marine set...and deserves to be seen in London on dry land at a larger venue."

The Bristol Evening Post's theatre critic David Harrison said, "Stinkfoot is a joy – a wondrous collection of bizarre characters, eccentric ideas, and at least one top ten contender among the songs. There is unlikely to be another Christmas show as innovative and challenging as this."
