= Black Dynamite =

2009 American blaxploitation action comedy film

- Theatrical release poster
- Directed by: Scott Sanders
- Screenplay by: Michael Jai White; Scott Sanders; Byron Minns
- Story by: Michael Jai White; Byron Minns
- Produced by: Jon Steingart; Jenny Wiener Steingart
- Starring: Michael Jai White; Tommy Davidson; Salli Richardson
- Cinematography: Shawn Maurer
- Edited by: Adrian Younge
- Music by: Adrian Younge
- Production company: Ars Nova Entertainment
- Distributed by: Apparition; Destination Films
- Release date: October 16, 2009
- Running time: 84 minutes
- Country: United States
- Language: English
- Budget: $2.9 million
- Box office: $296,557

Black Dynamite is a 2009 American blaxploitation action comedy film starring Michael Jai White, Tommy Davidson, and Salli Richardson. The film was directed by Scott Sanders and co-written by White, Sanders, and Byron Minns, who also co-stars. It was produced by Ars Nova Entertainment, a division of theater Ars Nova.

The plot centers on a former CIA agent turned pimp named Black Dynamite, who must avenge his brother's death while cleaning the streets of a new drug that is ravaging the community. The film is a parody of and homage to 1970s action and blaxploitation films. It had a trailer and funding even before a script was written. Black Dynamite was shot in 20 days in Super 16 format. The film was released in the United States on October 16, 2009, for only two weeks (with an "official" premiere at the Toronto After Dark film festival) and was well received by critics. It was released on home video on February 16, 2010.

== Plot ==
In the early 1970s, Black Dynamite, a Vietnam War veteran and former CIA officer, skilled in kung fu, vows to clean up the streets of drug dealers and gangsters after his younger brother Jimmy is killed by a shady organization. O'Leary, Black Dynamite's former army and CIA partner, reinstates him into the agency because they do not want him seeking vengeance by himself. While trying to get to the bottom of Jimmy's murder, he finds out that his brother was actually working undercover for the CIA. Black Dynamite also discovers the shady organization is filling the black orphanages with heroin. He declares war on local drug dealers and successfully cleans up the streets, earning him the affection of Gloria, a Black Power activist who works at the local orphanage.

After discovering the government's involvement in the drug ring, Black Dynamite steals the ledger belonging to corrupt Congressman James which details illegal shipments to a warehouse. Black Dynamite and his team (consisting of close friend Bullhorn, street hustler Cream Corn, militant leader Saheed, and three militants) storm the warehouse to capture a big shipment. They learn of a top-secret operation called "Code Kansas", but there are no drugs in the warehouse. They find only "Anaconda" brand malt liquor, a government-produced brand that, according to the advertising slogan, "Gives You Ooooooo!". In a diner, they decipher the slogan and uncover "Code Kansas" as a plan to literally emasculate African-American men through Anaconda Malt Liquor, which is formulated to "give (you) a little dick". The militant Gunsmoke, who has fallen victim to the liquor's effect, is killed to put him out of his misery. Returning to the warehouse, Black Dynamite finds O'Leary is part of the evil plan but is just following orders. He kills O'Leary before acquiring his next lead to find the source of the "Code Kansas" plan.

Black Dynamite heads to Kung Fu Island, where he discovers that his old nemesis, Fiendish Dr. Wu, is responsible for creating the secret formula found in Anaconda Malt Liquor. In a protracted battle which kills Saheed, the three militants, and Bullhorn, Black Dynamite discovers the true identity of the mastermind of the entire operation - the White House.

Black Dynamite then travels to the White House (in the process, Cream Corn is killed by the Secret Service) and confronts President Richard Nixon, who has been giving the orders from the beginning. Black Dynamite engages Nixon in a kung-fu battle. Nixon gets the upper hand when he dishonestly pulls John Wilkes Booth's gun, but the ghost of Abraham Lincoln appears and disarms Nixon with kung-fu. After defeating Nixon in a fair fight, Black Dynamite threatens to expose Nixon as the subject of a series of bondage and cross-dressing photographs. The president begs to be killed but Black Dynamite refuses to give him "the easy way out" and has Nixon watch out for his people. The film concludes with a monologue from Black Dynamite on his quest for justice as Gloria and Pat Nixon watch on rapturously.

== Cast ==
- Michael Jai White as Black Dynamite
  - Jon Kent Ethridge as 12-year-old Black Dynamite
  - Neil Lewis as 18-year-old Black Dynamite
- Salli Richardson as Gloria Gray
- Arsenio Hall as "Tasty Freeze"
- Kevin Chapman as O'Leary
- Tommy Davidson as "Cream Corn"
- Obba Babatundé as Osiris
- Richard Edson as Dino
- Buddy Lewis as "Gunsmoke"
- Brian McKnight as "Sweetmeat"
- Nicole Ari Parker as Mahogany Black
- Byron Minns as "Bullhorn"
- James McManus as Richard Nixon
- Phil Morris as Saheed
- Miguel A. Núñez Jr. as Mo "Bitches"
- Tucker Smallwood as Congressman Monroe James
- John Salley as Kotex
- Chris Spencer, Darrel Heath, and Jesse Lewis IV as Militants
- Mike Starr as Rafelli
- Nicole Sullivan as Patricia Nixon
- Kym Whitley as "Honeybee"
- Mykelti Williamson as "Chicago Wind"
- Bokeem Woodbine as Jack "Back Hand Jack" (misspelled in the end credits as "Black Hand Jack")
- Cedric Yarbrough as Chocolate Giddy-Up
- Roger Yuan as Fiendish Dr. Wu
- John Kerry as The Chief
- Phyllis Applegate as Aunt Billy
- William Bassett as Captain Yancy
- Baron Vaughn as Jimmy
- Cheryl Carter as Black Dynamite's Mother
- Pete Antico as Abraham Lincoln
- Stacy Adams as Nurse Jenny
- Lucas Gorham as Hagard
- Justine Joli, Charlotte Stokely, Charmane Star, and Erika Vuiton as Ladies of Leisure

== Production ==
"It's just a little too badass. That's the tone of the movie. Our humor comes from the fact that the movie is just a little too badass."

— Scott Sanders, director/writer

Michael Jai White originally thought of the idea for Black Dynamite around April 2006, while listening to James Brown's "Super Bad". White had also held blaxploitation movie parties where he picked up the "funny inconsistencies" in the films. White rented costumes, photographed himself and showed it to Sanders who was attracted to the idea. The same blue costume in White's photograph was used in the final scene of the film. Originally, the film was set to be named Super Bad after the song, but it was changed after the release of the 2007 film Superbad.

The original trailer was recorded even before the film went into production in order to raise money. It incorporated scenes from old blaxploitation movies with old voice overs from Adolph Caesar. The trailer was shot on Super 8 mm film for around $500 and contained numerous cultural references that placed the film in the 1970s, such as referring to the star of the film as a Baltimore Colts running back (the Colts moved to Indianapolis in 1984) and marveling at Black Dynamite's "five thousand dollar car" and "hundred dollar suit". White and Sanders showed it to Ars Nova owner Jon Steingart, who told them "Oh my God. Okay, we can raise the money for this."

Once financing was secured, writing the script took about three weeks. During the writing process, Minns' almost "encyclopedic knowledge" of blaxploitation helped them produce the script more quickly.

=== Filming ===
Cinematographer Shawn Maurer shot Black Dynamite on Super 16 Color Reversal Kodak film stock to get the high contrast and saturated look common in many low-budget Blaxploitation films of the 1970s. The film was then converted to digital for editing. The filmmakers supplemented their shoot with period stock footage from Sony Pictures Stock Footage, using films such as Missing in Action, Charlie's Angels, and Police Woman. Black Dynamite was shot in the Leimert Park, Ladera Heights, and Angeles Vista sections of Los Angeles over twenty days, with several green-screen days and one reshoot day. The film had such a low budget that they had to "think in the same ways that they had to think" in the classic blaxploitation movies. Sanders and White had a difficult time keeping the modern world out of the movie. Sanders was worried about anything modern that could destroy "the whole illusion". White worked individually with actors to keep their tone correct.

As an homage to the low production values and "one take only" style of blaxploitation films, many filming errors were done on purpose. For example, in one scene where Black Dynamite stands up from his desk, a red boom microphone appears above his head (which was common in Rudy Ray Moore films, such as Dolemite). Some of the actors recite their stage directions before their intended dialogue; in one scene, an actor verbalizes the stage direction written into a film script ("the militants turn startled"), and continues saying the scripted dialogue "How did you get in here?" (which causes Michael Jai White, the actor playing "Black Dynamite," to break character and look offscreen to see if the director will realize the error and call "cut" - which the unseen director does not do).

During casting, White sent Arsenio Hall the script, and "when he read that there's a Captain Kangaroo pimp in this thing," he accepted the role.

=== Score ===
Adrian Younge plays all instruments and wrote the lyrics to every song on the soundtrack except "Shine", "Cleaning Up The Streets", and "Gloria". His influences on the score were Curtis Mayfield, Isaac Hayes, Ennio Morricone and Wu-Tang Clan. Morricone greatly influenced Younge from the classical European funk music, while Wu-Tang Clan helped him focus on making music they would want to sample. Sanders gave Younge almost complete leeway, but he still had to work hard to impress others working on the film. To record the score, Younge used vintage tape recording equipment and then sent it to be digitally transferred.

The film's theme song is "Dynomite" by Sir Charles Hughes; its chorus plays nearly every time Black Dynamite appears or whenever a punch line is delivered.

== Release ==
Black Dynamite premiered at the 2009 Sundance Film Festival, where Sony Worldwide Acquisitions picked it up for distribution for "nearly $2 million". On June 14, the film won the Golden Space Needle Audience Award for Best Film at the Seattle International Film Festival, beating The Hurt Locker among other films. On August 25, 2009, it was announced that Apparition, a new distributor headed by Bill Pohlad and Bob Berney, would handle the film's domestic release.

=== Marketing ===
A viral campaign was launched on the web prior to the film's general release, spearheaded by a mock nonprofit organization called "Fight Smack in the Orphanage" (FSITO).

=== Box office ===
Black Dynamite had a limited release to only 70 theaters and a run time of two weeks. The film grossed $131,862 in its opening weekend, and its two-week total was $242,578. This placed it at number 264 for all films released in 2009.

=== Critical reception ===
Black Dynamite received positive reviews and currently holds an 83% approval rating on Rotten Tomatoes based on 63 reviews, with an average rating of 7.2/10. The site's consensus states: "A loving and meticulous send-up of 1970s blaxploitation movies, Black Dynamite is funny enough for the frat house and clever enough for film buffs." On Metacritic, Black Dynamite has a 65/100 rating, based on 14 critics, indicating "generally favorable" reviews.

Owen Gleiberman wrote in Entertainment Weekly, "Black Dynamite blends satire, nostalgia, and cinema deconstruction into a one-of-a-kind comedy high", noting Sanders captured the language and feel of blaxploitation. Roger Ebert awarded the film three stars out of four, and said, "Black Dynamite gets it mostly right, and when it's wrong, it's wrong on purpose and knows just what it's doing." He added that the film meticulously reproduces 1970s blaxploitation and brings back much-needed gratuitous nudity.

A.O. Scott of The New York Times considered Black Dynamite would be a better "five-minute clip on YouTube" than a feature film. Scott wrote, "A boom mike drifts down into the frame; an actor recites stage directions along with his lines. The camera zooms, pans and shifts focus as if it were being wielded by an optometrist on a cocaine binge. The acting is stiff, the dialogue painfully self-conscious, the action sequences choreographed and edited to look as cartoonish as possible. All of which is fun, for a while, in an academic kind of way." In a 2012 interview, "Black Dynamite" responded to Scott, saying "Well, obviously A.O. stands for 'asshole's opinion,' 'cause we here talking about it right now. Damn movie's been tweeted about every two minutes since 2009."

James Greenberg writing for The Hollywood Reporter believed the film would not hold audience's attention because among all the detail there was no real story.

=== Home media ===
Black Dynamite was released on February 16, 2010, on DVD and Blu-ray. Both releases contain an audio commentary, deleted scenes, a "making-of" featurette, and a Comic-Con Q&A panel. The Blu-ray has an extra featurette and trivia track.

== Legacy ==
=== Comic books ===
A one-shot was released by Ape Entertainment in April 2011, written by Brian Ash, with art by Jun LoFamia and colors by J.M. Ringuet.

IDW Publishing released a four-issue miniseries between December 2013 and August 2014. Written by Brian Ash, with art by Ron Wimberly and inks by Sal Buscema.

=== Animated series ===
An animated series spin-off of the film for Cartoon Network's nighttime programming block Adult Swim was announced shortly after its release. Produced by Ars Nova alongside Titmouse, Inc. and Cartoon Network Studios, it was cancelled after two seasons. Like the film, it was also well received.

=== Web series ===
In 2013, Chris Hardwick's Nerdist News released a series of short videos titled Black Dynamite Model Citizen on their YouTube channel. The video series is a parody of Japanese variety show sketches, featuring a Japanese-speaking Black Dynamite mannequin teaching the value of respect among other things to former WWE wrestlers, MMA fighters and American Gladiators athletes. Special guests include Roddy Piper, Chavo Guerrero Jr., Chris Masters, Daniel Puder, John Hennigan, Tank Abbott, Josh Barnett, and Kimo Leopoldo.

=== Sequel ===
Director Sanders said that he and White had ideas for a sequel if the film did well. White hinted that a sequel was being written during an interview on G4's Attack of the Show, and stated in an April 2012 interview that he hoped filming would begin at the end of that year. Black Dynamite 2 was slated for production in 2021 from Jaigantic Studios, with White writing and directing.

=== Spiritual sequel ===
In July 2023, the trailer for Outlaw Johnny Black was released, a spiritual sequel to Black Dynamite that once again stars Michael Jai White. Reception for the film was mixed. On the review aggregator website Rotten Tomatoes, 65% of 26 critics' reviews are positive, with an average rating of 6.20/10. Metacritic, which uses a weighted average, assigned the film a score of 54 out of 100, based on 5 critics, indicating "mixed or average" reviews.
