= Zekial Marko =

American writer (1933–2008)

Zekial Marko (October 21, 1933 – May 9, 2008) was an American writer who specialised in crime stories, often under the pen name of John Trinian. He was arrested during filming of Once a Thief and spent some time in prison. He died of complications related to emphysema on May 9, 2008, in Centralia, Washington.

== Early life ==
Zekial Marko was born as Marvin Leroy Schmoker on October 21, 1933, in Monterey County, California to Ruth Halverson and Wallace Cyril Schmoker. As children, Marko and his brother, Kenn Davis, were neighbors of John Steinbeck in Salinas, California.

After his parents divorced, Marko moved with his mother and brother to San Francisco. He attended grammar school there. At the beginning of WWII, Marko and his brother attended a Catholic boy's boarding school in Marin County. At the end of the war, Marko and his brother moved back with their mother and step father, Henry Davis. Kenn changed his surname to his step father's name. Marko changed his name to Zekial Marko.

== Career ==
"Marko, a flamboyant actor (later, a Hollywood screenwriter) from Salinas, stage-managed Goodwin's opera."

"Described as a troubled soul, Marko could also be brilliant and charming, and a powerful friend."

"Marko ... was an integral part of a circle of Bohemians who in the mid-1960s frequented Juanita's, a saloon operated by its colorful namesake on the converted ferry, the "Charles Van Damme", docked at on the Sausalito waterfront."

William Hjortsberg states that "Marko stage-managed Jack Goodwin's opera, The Pizza Pusher, that was to be performed at the festival the next day" ... "According to Goodwin, Marko "horned in and coached the poets while they rehearsed." ... "Marko made suggestions about tone, volume, tempo, and gesture." for the Six Gallery reading of Allen Ginsberg's "Howl"

"During the late 1950s, he did a stretch as a bartender at a Sausalito waterhole called The Tin Angel"

"Born in Salinas, in 1933, Trinian settled in the Bay area, supplementing his writing in the 1950s by working as a bartender in a Sausalito waterhole, reminiscent of a character in a Don Carpenter novel. Trinian had quite a reputation at the time, not all of it laudatory. Pulp pundit Rick Ollerman calls him “one of the most realistic of the Gold Medal writers.”"

"(Marko), who was pals with Richard Brautigan, Allen Ginsberg, and Jack Kerouac, (as well as most of the Beat Poets, Writers and personalities of the day), lived the lives he writes about."

John Trinian, North Beach Girl/Scandal on the Sand. "Two California novels, both published in 1960. North Beach Girl is a twisted tale set in the world of San Francisco’s beatniks, and Scandal is the story of a dozen strangers thrown together on an isolated stretch of beach with a dying whale and a sadistic cop. The double reprint includes new introductions by Rick Ollerman, Ki Longfellow and Belle Marko."

"Trinian's daughter, the artist Belle Marko, and a mid-volume remembrance by the novelist Ki Longfellow who, beginning when she was still a teenager, was Trinian's "soul-mate"

"May, 2014 : (Rick Ollerman's) In Pursuit of a Pleasant Oblivion originally appeared in North Beach Girl / Scandal on the Sand"

"(Belle Marko), who wrote a short essay about him that appears in a forthcoming edition of his books, makes it clear that having him as a father was both a fascinating and difficult experience."

"Brautigan shared his notes and observations with Zekial Marko (the "aspiring Hollywood scriptwriter" noted in the story), Philip Whalen, Lew Welch, and others. He incorporated several of their remarks into his final story" Richard Brautigan. "The Menu/1965" Evergreen Review (42) August 1966: 30–32, 86.

Edward Gorman championed Scandal on the Sand.

== Cannabis charge ==
During the shooting of 1965's "Once A Thief", Marko asked the director to cast him as the pot smoker who shares a cell with Alain Delon. The director, knowing Marko was a pot smoker, insisted he make the early call for the scene inside L.A. County Jail. Marko didn't show, having been jailed on a cannabis charge the night before. Zekial was transferred to the cell they had lit for the scene, played his part and then returned to his cell.

== Personal life ==
He had children with Naomi Williams: Aaron David Schmoker of Porterville, Belle Marko of San Anselmo, Zefra Marko of Marin County.

Marko was survived by his ex-wife, Sue, as well as his second ex-wife Rosalie Farre.

== Select credits ==
- A Game of Flesh (1959)
- The Big Grab (1959) - novel (written as "John Trinian") - filmed as Any Number Can Win (1963)
- North Beach Girl (1960) - novel (written as "John Trinian")
- The Savage Breast (1961) - novel (written as "John Trinian")
- Scratch a Thief (1961) - novel (written as "John Trinian")
- House of Evil (1962) - novel (written as "John Trinian")
- Scandal on the Sand (1964) - novel (written as "John Trinian")
- Once a Thief (1965) - screenplay, based on his novel Scratch a Thief
- Kolchak: The Night Stalker (1974) (TV series) - episode : "The Zombie"
- Mission: Impossible (1966–1973) (TV series) - episode :
- The Rockford Files (1974–1980) (TV series) - episode : Charlie Harris at Large
- Toma (1974) (TV series) - 2 episodes
