= Falcon Rising =

- Theatrical release poster
- Directed by: Ernie Barbarash
- Written by: Y.T. Parazi
- Produced by: Shahar Stroh; Etchie Stroh
- Starring: Michael Jai White; Neal McDonough; Jimmy Navarro; Millie Ruperto; Lateef Crowder; Masashi Odate; Hazuki Kato; Laila Ali
- Cinematography: Yaron Levy
- Edited by: Peter Devaney Flanagan
- Music by: Neal Acree
- Production companies: Moonstone Entertainment; Strohberry Films
- Distributed by: Freestyle Releasing
- Release date: September 5, 2014
- Running time: 100 minutes
- Country: United States
- Language: English
- Budget: $4.5 million
- Box office: $11,774

Falcon Rising is a 2014 American action film directed by Ernie Barbarash and starring Michael Jai White, Neal McDonough, Laila Ali and Masashi Odate. Formerly titled Favela, Falcon Rising was intended to be the first installment of Moonstone Entertainment's "CODENAME: FALCON" action franchise which was to revolve around former Marine character John "Falcon" Chapman, "a dark anti-hero driven by guilt, who will destroy himself unless given something else to destroy - a useful weapon-of-last-resort for the foreign ministry." Falcon Rising had a limited theatrical release on September 5, 2014.

== Plot ==
John "Falcon" Chapman is a United States Marine Corps veteran who suffers from posttraumatic stress disorder. After playing Russian roulette, he enters a convenience store moments before it is robbed. He demands one of the robbers shoot him, and when the man hesitates, Chapman grows impatient, disarms the robbers, and foils the robbery. When he meets with his sister Cindy, who has briefly returned to New York for a wedding, she chastises him for not taking his medication and explains that she is returning to Brazil, where she has been doing charity work for a non-profit organization. Chapman receives word from Manny Ridley, a fellow veteran and diplomat, that his sister has been severely beaten. Chapman immediately leaves for Brazil.

Chapman meets Thiago Santo and his partner Carlo Bororo, who are investigating his sister's assault. Though no witnesses have come forward, Santo promises justice. Santo and Ridley warn Chapman to avoid the gangster-controlled favelas, but Chapman insists on performing his own investigation. Katarina Da Silva, a beat cop, shows Chapman where his sister was found. When Chapman visits his sister in the hospital, an Asian nurse administers medicine to Cindy's IV. Cindy goes into convulsions, and Chapman calls for help. The hospital says they have no Asian nurses, and Ridley suggests that the yakuza may be involved, as Brazil has a sizeable Japanese immigrant population.

Chapman returns to the favela and beats up several people when he notices one is wearing Cindy's necklace. Da Silva arrives and stops him, explaining that the man is Cindy's friend. Da Silva translates for him, and Chapman learns that Cindy gave her necklace to him after his sister disappeared. The man gives Chapman Cindy's torn journal, which he recovered, and Chapman apologizes. Using carbon paper, Chapman recovers a phone number and contacts another of Cindy's friends, a photographer, who explains that she was investigating corruption and a possible conspiracy involving human trafficking. When the photographer is unwilling to part with proof, Chapman pickpockets it. The photographer dies in a car bomb seconds later.

After engaging in a gun fight with yakuza gangsters, Chapman investigates a nightclub with yakuza ties. There, he beats up a Brazilian smuggler who works for Hirimoto, the yakuza boss. Ridley identifies official documents as fakes and the two realize the yakuza are kidnapping young girls from the favela and forcing them into prostitution. At the same time, Santo organizes a violent raid of the favela, killing many Brazilian drug dealers. When one of his officers stumbles onto a yakuza kidnapping, Santo kills the officer and demands double his pay from the yakuza. Chapman investigates a yakuza brothel, where he is recognized and beats up several gangsters. Santo is called to kill him, but when Da Silva also arrives, Santo is unable to do anything.

Chapman hands over the evidence of smuggling and human trafficking to Santo but becomes suspicious when Santo accidentally reveals knowledge of the operation. On a hunch, Chapman sends Da Silva to protect his sister, and Da Silva kills the same yakuza assassin who previously pretended to be a nurse. Chapman tracks down a meeting between Santo, Bororo, and Hirimoto. After alerting Ridley, Chapman kills several yakuza and confronts the three men at once. Santo goes down first, then Bororo, and finally Hirimoto. As he lies dying, Santo denies involvement with Cindy's near-fatal attack, gives Chapman a key to a locker full of incriminating evidence, and requests a gun to commit suicide; Chapman obliges. Later, at a cafe, Ridley offers Chapman a job with the state department as an agent, which he accepts.

== Cast ==
- Michael Jai White as John 'Falcon' Chapman
- Neal McDonough as Manny Ridley
- Laila Ali as Cindy Chapman
- Jimmy Navarro as Thiago Santo
- Millie Ruperto as Katarina Da' Silva
- Lateef Crowder as Carlo Bororo
- Masashi Odate as Hirimoto (Nihongo: ヒリモト, Hirimoto)
- Hazuki Kato as Tomoe (Nihongo: ともえ, Tomoe)

== Release ==
Falcon Rising was released on Video on Demand (VOD) platforms on September 4, 2014, and had a limited release in ten North American theaters on September 5, 2014. The film grossed $8,691 in its opening weekend and grossed $11,774 by the end of its theatrical run. Falcon Rising was released on DVD on October 27, 2014.

== Reception ==
Rotten Tomatoes, a review aggregator, reports that 43% of seven surveyed critics gave the film a positive review; the average rating is 5.5/10. Metacritic rated it 49/100 based on four reviews. Frank Scheck of The Hollywood Reporter called it "a by-the-numbers thriller that mainly serves as a showcase for its star’s considerable fighting abilities". Nicolas Rapold of The New York Times likened the film to a 1980s TV cop show and wrote that although White's character is likeable, he is not menacing. Tom Long of The Detroit News wrote, "Falcon Rising is filled with so many action-flick cliches it could serve as a text on how not to do things." Simon Abrams of The Village Voice compared it to Commando. Abrams wrote that White's character, despite his charisma, "comes across like another pseudo-heroic American behaving badly abroad". Soren Andersen of The Seattle Times wrote, "Nothing new here, in other words, but White’s electrifying performance makes it all seem somehow fresh." Charles Bramesco of The Dissolve rated it 3/5 stars and wrote, "Though Falcon Rising occasionally fails to distinguish itself from the glut of similar globe-trotting action potboilers, it succeeds on the merits of White's winning performance."
