= Eio Books =

American publishing house

- Company type: Publishing
- Industry: Books, publishing
- Founded: March 21, 2004; 22 years ago
- Founder: Sydney Longfellow, Ki Longfellow
- Defunct: March 25, 2022; 4 years ago
- Fate: Closed
- Headquarters: Brattleboro, Vermont, U.S.
- Number of employees: 4

Eio Books was an American-based small press publishing house founded in 2004 in the city of Brattleboro, Vermont. In 2011, it opened a second office in Ross, California. Begun by Sydney Longfellow and Ki Longfellow, it is primarily known for the 2005 publication of Longfellow's novel, The Secret Magdalene, an exploration of the mystery of gnosis told through an interpretation of the life of Mary Magdalene.

Eio Books established itself through the success of its first publication. Ki Longfellow is the author of a number of books published by HarperCollins and Doubleday. The first in her Eio Books published trilogy of gnosis, The Secret Magdalene enjoyed instant acclaim and was then purchased and republished by Crown Publishing Group, the historical division of Random House. It has also been optioned by Nancy Savoca for a feature film now in active preproduction.

Eio Books has also published the second in Longfellow's trilogy: Flow Down Like Silver: Hypatia of Alexandria (2009), and in February 2011, it offered Twinka Thiebaud’s intimate memoir of Henry Miller and his table talk, What Doncha Know? about Henry Miller. This book contains not only Thiebaud's musings on her years of living with an aging Miller, but dozens of Miller's own personal tales about his life and times.

In May, 2011, Eio Books produced its first book of fantasy and psychological horror: Houdini Heart. It was considered for the Bram Stoker Award for Best Novel.

Early in 2012, Eio reprinted Ki Longfellow's first published novel, China Blues (published under the name Pamela Longfellow): (HarperCollins (UK), Doubleday (US), as well as eight foreign language printings. In 1989 China Blues was the subject of a bidding war between a number of major publishers.

Recently, the small publishing house added a new name to its roster of writers: James C. McKay, a highly placed litigator who served as the special prosecutor investigating the part of Edwin Meese III in the Wedtech scandal. At the time, Meese was Attorney General under the Reagan Administration. McKay's two books, one a memoir and one a thriller set in and around the Food and Drug Administration are being prepared for publication. The semi-autobiographical Billy's War was published in April 2013.

Also in early April 2013, Longfellow's first three titles in a series of murder mysteries in the hardboiled noir tradition featuring Sam Russo, 1940s Staten Island, New York Private Eye, saw print. In 2015, the fourth Sam Russo, Dead on the Rocks, was published.

On January 26, 2018, Ki finished a nine-year project, writing the book she'd promised her husband Vivian Stanshall she would write for him. The Illustrated Vivian Stanshall, a Fairytale of Grimm Art is part biography, part memoir and a large part Art Book. Around March 2022, the Eiobooks.com website was quietly shut down with no redirect put in its place.

== Titles ==
- The Secret Magdalene by Ki Longfellow ISBN 978-0-9759255-3-9
- Flow Down Like Silver, Hypatia of Alexandria by Ki Longfellow ISBN 978-0-9759255-9-1
- What Doncha Know? about Henry Miller by Twinka Thiebaud ISBN 978-0-9759255-2-2
- Houdini Heart by Ki Longfellow ISBN 978-0-9759255-1-5
- China Blues by Ki Longfellow ISBN 978-0-9759255-7-7
- Billy's War by James C. McKay ISBN 978-1937819064
- Shadow Roll, a Sam Russo Mystery (Case 1) by Ki Longfellow ISBN 978-1937819002
- Good Dog, Bad Dog, a Sam Russo Mystery (Case 2) by Ki Longfellow ISBN 978-1937819040
- The Girl in the Next Room, a Sam Russo Mystery (Case 3) by Ki Longfellow ISBN 978-1937819057
- Dead on the Rocks, a Sam Russo Mystery Case 4)
- The Illustrated Vivian Stanshall, a Fairytale of Grimm Art ISBN 978-0975925584
