= Marc Shell =

Canadian literary critic

Marc Shell, born 1947 in Montreal, is a Canadian literary critic. He has interests in nationalism and kinship. He is Irving Babbitt Professor of Comparative Literature and Professor of English, Emeritus, at Harvard University. Over 5 of his publications have each been cited over 100 times.

== Education ==
Shell studied at McGill University and Trinity College, Cambridge, and earned a B.A. from Stanford University and a Ph.D. from Yale University. Before Harvard, he taught at The State University of New York (Buffalo) and the University of Massachusetts (Amherst). Shell received a MacArthur Fellowship.

== "New Economic Criticism" ==
Shell is one of the forerunners, along with Jean-Joseph Goux and others, of the literary-critical movement that has been dubbed 'New Economic Criticism '. His contributions to the study of relations between linguistic and literary economies are encompassed in several books, including:

- The Economy of Literature (Johns Hopkins University Press, 1978).
- Money, Language, and Thought: Literary and Philosophical Economies from the Medieval to the Modern Era (University of California Press, 1982).
- Art and Money (University of Chicago Press, 1995).

== Other Work ==
Shell co-founded Harvard's Longfellow Institute, devoted to the study of Non-English American literatures. His books about translation, language policy and bilingualism include:

- The Multilingual Anthology of American Literature, co-edited with Werner Sollors (NYU Press, 2000)
- American Babel: Literatures of the United States from Abnaki to Zuni (Harvard University Press, 2002)

Shell's books in disability studies include works about paralysis and stuttering.

- Polio and its Aftermath: The Paralysis of Culture (Harvard University Press, 2005). According to Elise Lemire, in her review in The American Historical Review, 'Shell moves easily between his own painful recollections ... of contracting polio in Canada at the age of six ... to a dazzling array of texts' in the book.
- Stutter (Harvard University Press, 2006)

Shell's writings about Canada and the United States include:

- French-Canadian / American Literary Relations (McGill French Canada Studies Centre, 1968)
