= As Good as Dead (2022 film) =

- Theatrical release poster
- Directed by: R. Ellis Frazier
- Written by: Michael Jai White
- Starring: Michael Jai White; Tom Berenger
- Release date: 16 December 2022 (United States)
- Running time: 89 minutes
- Country: Mexico
- Languages: English; Spanish

As Good as Dead is a 2022 Mexican crime action film written by Michael Jai White, directed by R. Ellis Frazier and starring White and Tom Berenger.

== Plot ==
Bryant befriends a troubled teen and introduces him to martial arts. As Bryant's mysterious and dangerous past catches up to him, he is forced into a life and death struggle to clear his name, save the boy and get back all he left behind.

== Cast ==
- Michael Jai White as Bryant
- Tom Berenger as Sonny Kilbane
- Luca Oriel as Oscar
- Guillermo Iván as Hector
- Gabriela Quezada as Marisol

== Release ==
The film was released in the United States in theaters and on VOD and digital on 16 December 2022.

== Reception ==
The film has a 71% rating on Rotten Tomatoes based on seven reviews. Alan Ng of Film Threat rated the film an 8 out of 10. Jennifer Green of Common Sense Media awarded the film two stars out of five.
