= A New Literary History of America =

Collection of essays

- First edition (publ. Belknap Press)
- Author: Greil Marcus; Werner Sollors
- Language: English
- Subject: Literary studies
- Published: 2009
- Publisher: Belknap Press
- Publication place: United States
- Pages: 1128
- ISBN: 0674035941

A New Literary History of America is an anthology of essays edited by Greil Marcus and Werner Sollors. Its roughly 200 essays span a range of topics that the editors selected as a sample of the different voices and perspectives on North America since the genesis of the European concept of a New World.
