= Trouble Man (2025 film) =

- Theatrical release poster
- Directed by: Michael Jai White
- Written by: Michael Stradford
- Produced by: Craig Baumgarten; Michael Jai White; Ron Robinson
- Starring: Michael Jai White; Method Man; Noah Fleder; Mike Epps; Gillian White; Orlando Jones; La La Anthony
- Cinematography: Keith L. Smith
- Edited by: Scott Richter
- Music by: Amani K. Smith; Demonte Posey
- Production company: Swirl Films
- Distributed by: Samuel Goldwyn Films
- Release dates: June 12, 2025 (American Black Film Festival); August 1, 2025 (United States)
- Running time: 92 minutes
- Country: United States
- Language: English

Trouble Man is a 2025 American action comedy film directed by and starring Michael Jai White.

The film premiered at the American Black Film Festival on June 12, 2025, and was released in the US on August 1, 2025.

== Premise ==
The film follows Jaxen, a former cop turned private investigator in Atlanta who is hired to find the missing R&B star Jahari.

== Cast ==
- Michael Jai White as Jaxen, a former cop turned Atlanta PI
- Method Man
- Noah Fleder
- Mike Epps
- Gillian White as Gina
- Orlando Jones
- La La Anthony

== Production ==
By December 2023, the film has wrapped production. Samuel Goldwyn Films served as the financing company.

== Release ==
The film was originally scheduled to be released on 2024. It premiered at the American Black Film Festival June 12, 2025, and was released in the US on August 1, 2025, in theaters and through video-on-demand (VOD) by Samuel Goldwyn Films.
