= Once a Thief (1965 film) =

1965 film by Ralph Nelson

- Original movie poster
- Directed by: Ralph Nelson
- Screenplay by: Zekial Marko
- Based on: Scratch a Thief; 1961 novel by Zekial Marko (as "John Trinian")
- Produced by: Jacques Bar
- Starring: Alain Delon; Ann-Margret; Van Heflin; Jack Palance; Tony Musante
- Cinematography: Robert Burks
- Edited by: Fredric Steinkamp
- Music by: Lalo Schifrin
- Production company: CIPRA
- Distributed by: Metro-Goldwyn-Mayer
- Release date: September 8, 1965
- Running time: 106 minutes
- Countries: United States; France
- Languages: English; Italian
- Box office: 749,282 admissions (France)

Once a Thief is a 1965 crime film directed by Ralph Nelson and starring Alain Delon, Ann-Margret, Van Heflin, Jack Palance, and Tony Musante in his film debut. It was written by Zekial Marko, based on his 1961 novel Scratch a Thief. The movie was known in France as Les tueurs de San Francisco.

Nelson won the OCIC award at the 1965 San Sebastián International Film Festival for the film. The film was adapted in Telugu as Adrushtavanthulu.

== Plot ==
Ex-convict Eddie Pedak tries to lead a normal life in San Francisco with a loving wife Kristine, a daughter, and a steady job. Much to his chagrin, he also has a vengeful police detective and estranged brother complicating his life.

The detective, Mike Vido, remains bitter over being shot six years ago during an unsolved robbery. Despite only having seen the shooter's eyes, he is sure that it was Eddie. Since Eddie's release from prison, Vido has harassed him and gotten him fired from numerous jobs. When a shopkeeper is killed in a robbery, he is convinced it is again Eddie, but the witness insists otherwise. Eddie nonetheless loses his job because of the arrest.

Meanwhile, Eddie's brother Walter, head of a criminal gang, attempts to recruit him for a final heist, offering him $50,000 for one night's work. Eddie refuses, but he is unable to secure another job or collect unemployment, prompting Kristine to begin working as a waitress. Walter drops by and informs him that Kristine's job is really at a sleazy nightclub, where Eddie finds her, to his fury. Eddie then agrees to participate in the heist, and it is revealed why Walter has been so persistent about Eddie's participation: they plan to rob his former employer, and his inside knowledge of the company is vital to the robbery. It becomes evident that Sargatanas and Shoenstein, other members of Walter's gang, framed Eddie for the shopkeeper's murder, and mistrust grows. After doing his own investigating, Vido approaches Eddie and tells him he knows that he was framed for the murder. He gives Eddie the chance to come clean before the heist, but Eddie turns him down.

The thieves get away with $1 million in platinum. After Sargatanas kills another member of the gang, Eddie and Walter take off with the loot and hide in a truck. Sargatanas and Shoenstein find and kill Walter, and abduct Eddie's daughter in order to trade her for the platinum.

Eddie finds Vido, and tells him about the kidnapping. Vido agrees to help him in exchange for his confession and the return of the stolen platinum. After Eddie finally admits that he did in fact shoot Vido years ago, Vido is surprised to find that he no longer feels vindictive. Eddie and Vido make their way to the arranged meetup, where the remaining thieves and the loot are, as well as his daughter. After his daughter is released, Eddie brings them to the truck containing the platinum. Sargatanas suddenly kills Shoenstein, initiating a shootout that results in the wounding of Eddie and Vido. After a struggle with Eddie over the gun, Sargatanas dies. With the gun in his grasp, Eddie staggers triumphantly toward Vido. Vido’s partner arrives on the scene. He quickly and incorrectly assesses the situation and kills Eddie, to Vido's dismay.

== Cast ==
- Alain Delon as Eddie Pedak
- Ann-Margret as Kristine Pedak
- Van Heflin as Mike Vido
- Jack Palance as Walter Pedak
- John Davis Chandler as Sargatanas
- Tony Musante as Shoenstein
- Jeff Corey as Lt. Kebner
- Steve Mitchell as Frank Kane

== Production ==
The story was based on the personal experiences of screenwriter Zekial Marko; he had written the novel The Big Grab, which was adapted into Any Number Can Win, a big hit for Delon. Once a Thief was based on Marko's novel Scratch a Thief and this was his first screenplay. Marko had a small role in the film and spent time in jail on criminal charges during the shoot.

== Critical reception ==
A. H. Weiler of The New York Times wrote that the film was not as good as similar genre pictures, but praised the accuracy of its gangster dialogue:

The melodrama may be tough, laconic and filled with a sense of doom, but it is hardly an innovation or an improvement on the gangster-with-a-heart-of-gold fare that has preceded it..... [The screenwriter] provided a generally terse, hard-bitten script whose language sounds like that used by the gunmen, narcotics addicts and hipsters of San Francisco's lower depths.

The Chicago Tribune thought the film "routine": "This is a grim and gory crime melodrama. If my count is correct there are five murders and one near miss....Alain Delon seemed miscast as Eddie, a smoldering sort of character with a bad temper. Ann-Margret, as his wife, is in tears or having hysterics for most of the footage. She has good reasons for such emotions, but it does get tiresome. A routine crime story, it hardly seemed worth the talents of Ralph Nelson."

In 2021, Filmink argued "It was not a bad movie and at least had aspirations to quality, but it just... couldn’t quite live up to its ambition."

The film was not a success at the box office.

== See also ==
- List of American films of 1965
- List of hood films
