= Michael Jai White =

American actor and martial artist (born 1967)

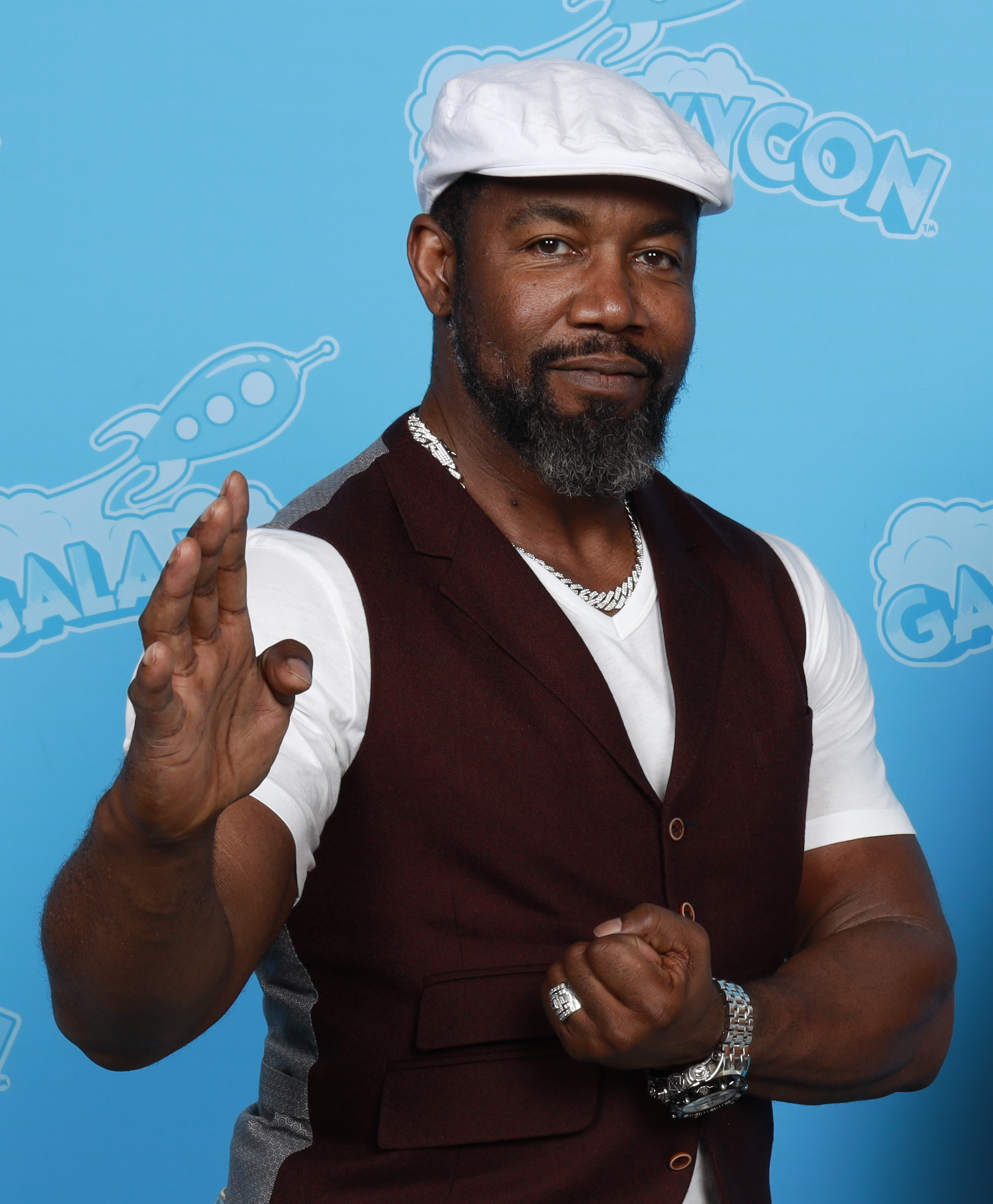
- White at GalaxyCon Raleigh in 2024
- Born: November 10, 1967 (age 59); New York City, U.S.
- Occupations: Actor; martial artist; director
- Years active: 1989–present
- Spouses: Courtenay Chatman (m. 2005; div. 2011) Gillian Iliana Waters (m. 2015)
- Children: 3
- Relatives: Kym Whitley (cousin)

Michael Jai White (born November 10, 1967) (Note: The Associated Press has listed his birth year as 1964.) is an American actor, martial artist, and director. Though he has appeared in a variety of genres, White is best known for his action and martial arts films. His first major starring role and breakout performance was in the 1995 HBO film Tyson as heavyweight boxer Mike Tyson. He went on to portray Al Simmons in the 1997 film Spawn, making him the first African American to portray a major comic book superhero in a major motion picture. (Note: Spawn was released on August 1, 1997, two weeks before the release of Steel, which starred NBA basketball player Shaquille O'Neal. Robert Townsend and Damon Wayans also starred in the superhero films The Meteor Man (1993) and Blankman (1994), respectively, both parodies.) His work in Spawn earned him a nomination for the Blockbuster Entertainment Award for Best Male Newcomer.

In 1999, White starred opposite Jean-Claude Van Damme in Universal Soldier: The Return, and in 2001, he starred opposite Steven Seagal in Exit Wounds. He has since been cast in several mainstream films in supporting roles, such as the Tyler Perry films Why Did I Get Married? (2007) and Why Did I Get Married Too? (2010), though most of his lead roles have been in direct to video films or limited theatrical releases, such as Black Dynamite, Blood and Bone (both 2009), Falcon Rising (2014), Accident Man (2018), Dragged Across Concrete (2019), and As Good as Dead (2022), He directed and starred in Never Back Down 2: The Beatdown (2011), Never Back Down: No Surrender (2016), and Outlaw Johnny Black (2023).

White has been training in martial arts since the age of 7, and specializes in the styles of Kyokushin, taekwondo, kobudō, Shotokan, and the Superfoot System.

== Early life ==
White is a martial artist trained in nine different styles: Shōtōkan, Goju-Ryu (for which he studied under Master Eddie Morales where he learned to sharpen his Goju karate technique), taekwondo, kobudō, Tang Soo Do, wushu, jujutsu, Kyokushin, boxing, and kickboxing, with a specific focus in Kyokushin Karate (although his style incorporates aspects of many different martial arts forms). White started training in martial arts at the age of seven in Jujutsu. He next took up Shōtōkan and moved on to other styles later. White holds seven legitimate black belts in Kyokushin Karate, Goju-Ryu Karate, Shotokan Karate, taekwondo, Tang Soo Do, kobudō, and wushu.

White is also a former special education teacher and taught students with behavioral problems for three years. He cites his history in education as the reason why, despite his personal love for the music genre on "a lot of levels", he cannot "in good [conscience]" have a positive opinion on hip-hop or "excuse some of [its] pervasive and destructive elements", mainly due to his experience with youngsters who had difficulty seeing the difference between it and real life.

White graduated from Central High School in Bridgeport, Connecticut in 1982.

== Career ==
White's first major starring role was in the 1995 HBO film Tyson as heavyweight boxer Mike Tyson. He portrayed the eponymous character in the 1997 film Spawn, making him the first African American to portray a major comic book superhero in a major motion picture. His work in Spawn earned him a nomination for the Blockbuster Entertainment Award. In 1999, White starred opposite Jean-Claude Van Damme in Universal Soldier: The Return. A few years earlier, he appeared in Full Contact with Jerry Trimble. In 2001, he starred opposite fellow martial artist Steven Seagal in Exit Wounds. In 2003, he appeared in Busta Rhymes and Mariah Carey's music video "I Know What You Want". Since 2003, in addition to his on screen roles, White has been doing voice work, including in Static Shock and Justice League. White showcased his martial arts skills in the direct-to-DVD film Undisputed II: Last Man Standing. In 2004, he appeared in Michelle Yeoh's Silver Hawk. That year, he also appeared in Kill Bill: Volume 2, although his role was cut from the theatrical release. He also had roles in Undisputed II: Last Man Standing (2006) and Blood and Bone (2009). His film Why Did I Get Married? opened at number one at the box office on October 12, 2007.

White played the role of mob boss Gambol in the 2008 film The Dark Knight. He also starred in the film Blood and Bone and the blaxploitation homage Black Dynamite, both released in 2009. White wrote the scripts for both Black Dynamite and 3 Bullets in which he stars with Bokeem Woodbine.

On March 30, 2010, White appeared on The Mo'Nique Show to promote his film Why Did I Get Married Too?. The two joked about the acclaim that comes with winning an Oscar. In May of that year, he appeared in the music video for Toni Braxton's new song "Hands Tied" from her album Pulse, as well as the Nicki Minaj music video for "Your Love" as Nicki's sensei and love interest.

He also starred in Kevin Tancharoen's short film Mortal Kombat: Rebirth as Jax Briggs, and reprised the role in Mortal Kombat: Legacy, a web series from the same director. He posted on Twitter that he would not be returning to the role for the second season, but would return for the 2013 film.

White made his directorial debut and starred in Never Back Down 2: The Beatdown, which was released on home video on September 13, 2011.

White also voiced Green Lantern in the video game Justice League Heroes.

White has co-starred as Vegas Duncan in Carl Weber's The Family Business on BET since 2018.

In October 2019, White announced that the spiritual successor to Black Dynamite titled Outlaw Johnny Black had officially entered pre-production. Despite the Indiegogo campaign not reaching its goal, he was still able to secure enough backers and additional donors to get the project off the ground. In July 2023, its trailer was released. Its theatrical release date was September 15, 2023.

In October 2020, White's film Welcome to Sudden Death debuted on Netflix and became one of the most watched films on the platform. The Universal Pictures Home Entertainment release is a remake of the 1995 film Sudden Death starring Jean-Claude Van Damme.

On July 12, 2021, White laid out a vision for starting a film studio in New Haven, Connecticut called "Jaigantic Studios". He wants to create a studio district on New Haven's Quinnipiac River waterfront.

In November 2025, White became the first non-Asian recipient of the Bruce Lee Award.

In 2026, White appeared as James Watkins in Paper Made, a martial arts drama directed by Ryan Watson and filmed in Tampa, Florida. The film premiered at AMC Westshore 14 in Tampa on August 28th, 2026.

== Personal life ==
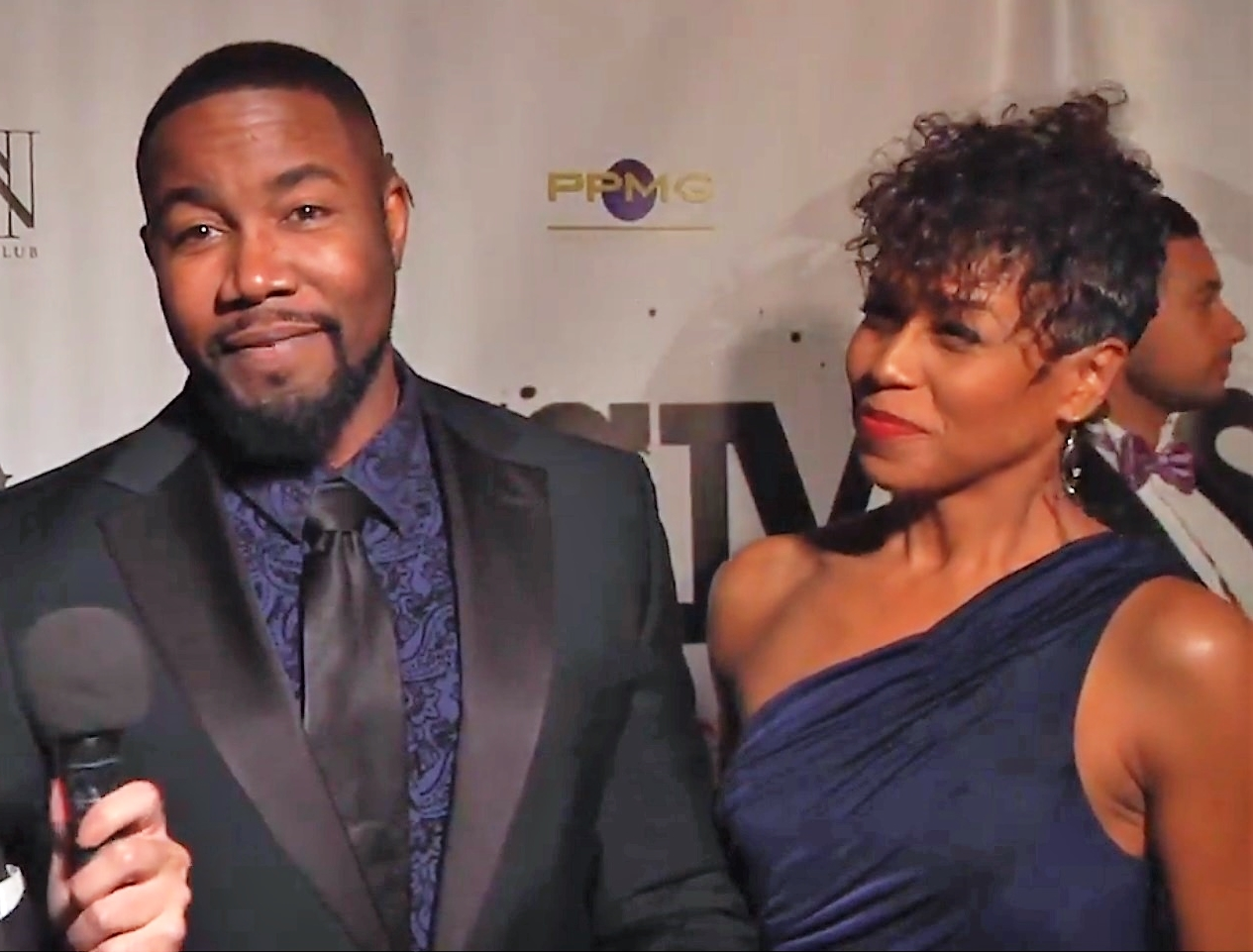
Michael Jai White and Gillian White in 2017

From 2005 to 2011, White was married to Courtenay Chatman; together, they have a daughter named Morgan. In addition, White has two sons. In February 2014, White announced his engagement to actress Gillian Iliana Waters. In April 2015, White penned an open letter via Facebook entitled "Apologies to My Ex's", where he credited Waters for helping him become "the very best version of myself." In July 2015, White married Waters in Thailand. They appeared together in the martial arts thriller film Take Back (2021), with Waters starring as the female lead.

In 2014, White was named Man of the Year by Black Belt magazine and honored with the Fists of Legends Decade Award at the Urban Action Showcase & Expo at HBO. In 2015, he was inducted into the International Sports Hall of Fame. In 2017, he was inducted into the Martial Arts History Museum Hall of Fame. On November 8, 2019, he assumed the "Mantle of The Black Dragon" from Ron van Clief, Don "The Dragon" Wilson, Cynthia Rothrock, and Taimak, in a ceremony at the 2019 Urban Action Showcase & Expo at AMC 25, New York City.

White briefly dated actress Angela Bassett during the 1990s.

White is a cousin of comedian and actress Kym Whitley.

== Filmography ==
=== Film ===
Year	Title	Role	Notes
1989	The Toxic Avenger Part II	Apocalypse Inc. Executive	
1989	The Toxic Avenger Part III: The Last Temptation of Toxie	Apocalypse Inc. Executive	
1991	Teenage Mutant Ninja Turtles II: The Secret of the Ooze	Man in audience	
1991	True Identity	Alley Guy #1	
1992	Universal Soldier	Soldier	
1993	Full Contact	Low-Ball	
1994	On Deadly Ground	Oil Worker	
1994	Lion Strike	Silvio	
1995	Tyson	Mike Tyson	
1995	Ballistic	Quint	
1996	2 Days in the Valley	Buck	
1997	City of Industry	Odell Williams	
1997	Spawn	Al Simmons / Spawn	
1998	Ringmaster	Demond	
1998	Thick as Thieves	Pointy	
1999	Breakfast of Champions	Howell	
1999	Universal Soldier: The Return	S.E.T.H. Super UniSol	
2000	The Bus Stop	Unknown	Short
2001	Exit Wounds	Sergeant Lewis Strutt	
2002	Trois 2: Pandora's Box	Hampton Hines	
2003	Justice	Tre	
2004	Silver Hawk	Morris	
2004	Kill Bill: Volume 2	Martial Artist	Scene deleted
2006	Undisputed II: Last Man Standing	George "The Iceman" Chambers	Video
2007	Why Did I Get Married?	Marcus	
2008	The Dark Knight	Gambol	
2009	Black Dynamite	Black Dynamite	Also writer
2009	The Legend of Bruce Lee	Ali	Video
2009	Blood and Bone	Isaiah Bone	
2009	Three Bullets	The Man	Short; also writer
2010	Why Did I Get Married Too?	Marcus	
2010	Mortal Kombat: Rebirth	Jackson "Jax" Briggs	Video short
2011	Never Back Down 2: The Beatdown	Casey "Case" Walker Jr.	Video; also director
2011	Tactical Force	SWAT Sergeant Tony Hunt	
2012	We the Party	Officer Davis	
2012	Freaky Deaky	Donnell Lewis	
2012	The Philly Kid	Arthur Letts	
2013	Fedz	"Big D"	
2014	Android Cop	Hammond	
2014	Falcon Rising	John "Falcon" Chapman	
2014	Skin Trade	FBI Agent Reed	
2015	Chocolate City	Princeton	
2015	Chain of Command	James Webster	
2016	Vigilante Diaries	Barrington	
2016	The Asian Connection	Greg "Greedy Greg"	
2016	Never Back Down: No Surrender	Casey "Case" Walker Jr.	Video; also writer and director
2017	S.W.A.T.: Under Siege	"Scorpion"	
2017	Chocolate City: Vegas Strip	Princeton	
2017	Cops and Robbers	Michael	
2018	Accident Man	Mick	
2018	Making a Killing	Orlando Hudson	
2018	Dragged Across Concrete	"Biscuit"	
2019	The Hard Way	Payne	
2019	Triple Threat	Devereaux	
2019	Undercover Brother 2	Undercover Brother	
2020	Welcome to Sudden Death	Jesse	Direct-to-Video
2021	Batman: Soul of the Dragon	Bronze Tiger (voice)	Direct-to-video
2021	Assault on VA-33	Chief Malone	
2021	Take Back	Brian	
2021	Send It!	Coach	
2021	Rogue Hostage	Sparks	
2021	Black Friday	Archie	
2022	The Commando	James Baker	
2022	Dead Zone	Boss	Tubi original
2022	The Hit	Brooke	
2022	As Good as Dead	Bryant	Also writer
2022	Come Out Fighting	Sergeant AJ 'Red' McCarron	Direct-to-video
2023	You're Not Alone	Keith Mitchell	Tubi original
2023	A Snowy Day in Oakland	Reverend Carter	Direct-to-video
2023	The Island	Mark	
2023	MR-9: Do or Die	Duke	Direct-to-video
2023	Outlaw Johnny Black	Johnny Black	Also writer, director and producer
2024	One More Shot	Robert Jackson	Direct-to-video
2024	Sunset Superman	JT	
2024	Joe Washington	Joe Washington	Tubi original
2025	Trouble Man	Jaxen	Also writer, director and producer
2025	The Secret Between Us	Jack Frazier	
2025	Hostile Takeover	Pete	
2025	Exit Protocol	Isaac Florentine	
2026	Oscar Shaw	Oscar Shaw	
2026	Paper Made	James Watkins	

=== Television ===
Year	Title	Role	Notes
1992	Saved by the Bell	Military Police Man #2	Episode: "Wrestling with the Future"
1993	Renegade	Luther, Dawn's Boyfriend	Episode: "Vanished"
1994	Martin	Valdez	Episode: "Arms Are for Hugging"
1994	Living Single	Steve	Episode: "Hot Fun in the Wintertime"
1995	NYPD Blue	Officer Reggie Fancy	2 episodes
1995	JAG	Navy Petty Officer Peter Quinn / Lieutenant Martin Payne	Episode: "Brig Break"
1995	Tyson	Mike "Iron Mike" Tyson	Television film
1996	Captive Heart: The James Mink Story	Elroy	Television film
1996	Shaughnessy	Carpenter	Television film
1999	Mutiny	Ben Cooper	Television film
2000	Wonderland	Dr. Derrick Hatcher	Main cast
2000	Freedom Song	Coleman Vaughnes	Television film
2001	Boston Public	Darren Schofield	Episode: "Chapter Eighteen"
2001	Soul Food	Russell Banks	Episode: "Who Do You Know?"
2003	CSI: Miami	Officer Roy Bailey	Episode: "Hard Time"
2003	Justice League	Doomsday (voice)	Episode: "A Better World"
2003	Hotel	Unknown	Television film
2003–2004	Static Shock	Osebo (voice)	2 episodes
2004–2005	Clubhouse	Ellis Hayes	Recurring cast
2005	Justice League Unlimited	Doomsday (voice)	Episode: "The Doomsday Sanction"
2006	Windfall	Michael	Episode: "Priceless"
2006	Getting Played	Actor	Television film
2008	Tyler Perry's House of Payne	Bryan	Recurring cast, season 3
2010	The Boondocks	Bushido Brown, Cop (voice)	Episode: "Stinkmeaner 3: The Hateocracy"
2010	One Angry Juror	Derrick	Television film
2011	Batman: The Brave and the Bold	Tattooed Man (voice)	Episode: "The Scorn of the Star Sapphire!"
2011–2017	Tyler Perry's For Better or Worse	Marcus Williams	Main cast
2011–2015	Black Dynamite	Black Dynamite (voice)	Main cast; also creator
2012	Aqua Something You Know Whatever	Zucotti Manicotti (voice)	Episode: "Zucotti Manicotti"
2012	Somebody's Child	Douglas	Television film
2012	Métal Hurlant Chronicles	Teague	Episode: "King's Crown"
2013–2014, 2018–2019	Arrow	Ben Turner / Bronze Tiger	Guest (season 2), recurring (season 7); 10 episodes
2014	Métal Hurlant Chronicles	Balt	Episode: "The Endomorphe"
2016	The Crooked Man	Milo	Television film
2017	Insecure: Due North	Zeke	Episode: "201"
2017	Insecure	Zeke	2 episodes
2018	Every Day Is Christmas	Justin	Television film
2018–present	The Family Business	Vegas Duncan	Recurring cast
2020	Black-ish	Vincent	Episode: "Dad Bod-y of Work"
2020	Pump	Eric	Main cast
2022–2023	Kingdom Business	Julius "Caesar" Jones	Main cast
2025	The Family Business: New Orleans	Vegas Duncan	Episode: "Surprise, Surprise"
2025	Teen Titans Go!	Don Jackson	Voice, episode: "Megalodon Jackson"

=== Music videos ===
Year	Video	Performer
2003	"I Know What You Want"	Busta Rhymes and Mariah Carey featuring The Flipmode Squad
2010	"Your Love"	Nicki Minaj
2010	"Hands Tied"	Toni Braxton
2012	"Let's Go"	Calvin Harris featuring Ne-Yo
2021	"Where I Belong"	Busta Rhymes and Mariah Carey

=== Video games ===
Year	Title	Voice role
2006	Justice League Heroes	John Stewart
2007	The Underground Bounty Hunter	Hatch
2022	Marvel's Midnight Suns	Eric Brooks / Blade
2026	Grand Theft Auto VI	Kordell Grant

=== Web series ===
Year	Title	Role	Notes
2011	Mortal Kombat: Legacy	Jackson "Jax" Briggs	2 episodes
2016	Enter the Dojo	Himself	Episode: "How to Fight a Clown"
