= Werner Sollors =

German academic

Professor Werner Max Sollors
- Born: June 6, 1943 (age 82); Kronberg, Germany
- Education: Columbia University; Free University of Berlin
- Children: 2
- Parents: Ferdinand Sollors, teacher; Martha Sollors, homemaker
- Awards: 1981 Guggenheim fellow; 1999-2000 National Endowment for the Humanities fellow; 2003 Lifetime achievement award for outstanding scholarship and criticism of the field of U.S. ethnic literary studies, MELUS

Werner Max Sollors (born June 6, 1943) is Henry B. and Anne M. Cabot Professor of English and of African American Studies at Harvard University. He is also Global Professor of Literature at New York University Abu Dhabi.

== Background ==
Sollors received a doctorate in philosophy in 1975 from the Free University of Berlin.

== Academic appointments ==
- Freie Universität Berlin, Berlin, West Germany, assistant professor of American studies, 1970–77
- Columbia University, New York City, assistant professor, 1975–82, associate professor of English, 1982–83
- Harvard University, Cambridge, Massachusetts
  - Andrew W. Mellon faculty fellow, 1977–78
  - professor of American literature and Language and Afro-American Studies, 1983--
  - Henry B. and Anne M. Cabot Professor of English Literature, 1988--
  - Walter Channing Cabot fellow, 1997–98
- Washington University in St. Louis, Hurst Professor, 2004–05
- Indiana University, Bloomington, IN, Patten Lecturer, 2008–09
- University of Texas at San Antonio, Brackenridge Distinguished Visiting Professor, 2009
- Ca' Foscari University of Venice

== Work ==
His writings include Beyond Ethnicity: Consent and Descent in American Culture (1986), Neither Black Nor White and Yet Both: Thematic Explorations of Interracial Literature (1997), Ethnic Modernism (2008), and The Temptation of Despair: Tales of the 1940s (2014). He was also the editor for the Modern Library Classics release of Georges by Alexandre Dumas.

- Sollors, Werner (2005). "Goodbye, Germany" (PDF). TRANSIT a Journal of Travel, Migration, and Multiculturalism in the German-speaking World. 1 (1).
- Sollors, Werner, ed. (2004). An anthology of interracial literature : Black-white contacts in the Old World and the New. New York: New York University Press. ISBN 0814781438. LCCN 2003056105.
- Sollors, Werner; Diedrich, Maria, eds. (1994). The Black Columbiad : defining moments in African American literature and culture. Cambridge, Massachusetts: Harvard University Press. ISBN 0674076176. LCCN 94019727.
- Sollors, Werner; Titcomb, Caldwell; Underwood, Thomas A., eds. (1993). Blacks at Harvard : a documentary history of African-American experience at Harvard and Radcliffe. with an introduction by Randall Kennedy. New York: New York University Press. ISBN 0814779727. LCCN 92027074.
- Fluck, Winfried; Sollors, Werner, eds. (2002). German? American? Literature? : new directions in German-American studies. New York: P. Lang. ISBN 0820452297. LCCN 2002024048.
- Sollors, Werner, ed. (2000). Interracialism : black-white intermarriage in American history, literature, and law. Oxford, New York: Oxford University Press. ISBN 0195128567. LCCN 99032521.
- Sollors, Werner, ed. (1989). The Invention of ethnicity. New York: Oxford University Press. ISBN 0195045890. LCCN 88005963.
- Sollors, Werner, ed. (1998). Multilingual America : transnationalism, ethnicity, and the languages of American literature. New York: New York University Press. ISBN 081478092X. LCCN 98006851.
- Shell, Marc; Sollors, Werner, eds. (2000). The Multilingual anthology of American literature : a reader of original texts with English translations. New York: New York University Press. ISBN 0814797520. LCCN 00030535.
- Marcus, Greil; Sollors, Werner, eds. (2009). A New Literary History of America. Cambridge, Massachusetts: Belknap Press of Harvard University. ISBN 9780674035942. LCCN 2009014255.
- Sollors, Werner, ed. (1993). The Return of thematic criticism. Cambridge, Massachusetts: Harvard University Press. ISBN 0674766873. LCCN 92020083.
- Sollors, Werner, ed. (1996). Theories of ethnicity : a classical reader. Washington Square, New York: New York University Press. ISBN 0814780342. LCCN 96012967.
- Sollors, Werner; Underwood, Thomas A.; Titcomb, Caldwell, eds. (1986). Varieties of black experience at Harvard : an anthology. Cambridge, Massachusetts: Harvard University, Dept. of Afro-American Studies. LCCN 87672129.
- Antin, Mary (2012) [previously published 1997]. The promised land. introduction and notes by Werner Sollors. New York: Penguin Books. ISBN 9780143106777. LCCN 2012011363.
- Chesnutt, Charles W. (Charles Waddell) (2012). Sollors, Werner (ed.). The marrow of tradition : authoritative text, contexts, criticism (1st ed.). New York: W. W. Norton & Co. ISBN 9780393934144. LCCN 2011050007.
- Dumas, Alexandre (2008). Sollors, Werner (ed.). Georges. a new translation by Tina Kover; with an introduction and notes, by Werner Sollors; foreword by Jamaica Kincaid (Modern Library pbk. ed.). New York: Modern Library. ISBN 9780812975895. LCCN 2008276132. also 2007
- Equiano, Olaudah (2001), Sollors, Werner (ed.), The Interesting Narrative of the Life of Olaudah Equiano, or Gustavus Vassa, the African written by himself; authoritative text, contexts, criticism (1st ed.), New York: Norton, ISBN 0393974944, LCCN 00058386
- John F. Kennedy-Institut für Nordamerikastudien Bibliothek (1972), A bibliographic guide to Afro-American studies (based on the holdings of the John F. Kennedy-Institut library), compiled and edited by Werner Sollors (with introductory essays by Ernest Kaiser and the compiler), Berlin: John F. Kennedy-Institut für Nordamerikastudien, Freie Universität Berlin, LCCN 74158531
- John F. Kennedy-Institut für Nordamerikastudien Bibliothek, A bibliographic guide to Afro-American studies: supplement one (based on recent acquisitions of the John F. Kennedy-Institute Library), compiled and edited by Werner Sollors (with contributions by Volkhard Brandes ... et al.), Berlin: John F. Kennedy-Institut für Nordamerikastudien, Freie Universität Berlin, LCCN 76383829
- Sollors, Werner (1978), Amiri Baraka/LeRoi Jones : the quest for a "populist modernism", New York: Columbia University Press, ISBN 0231042264, LCCN 78007499
- Sollors, Werner (1986), Beyond ethnicity : consent and descent in American culture, New York: Oxford University Press, ISBN 0195036948, LCCN 85015249
- Sollors, Werner (2008), Ethnic modernism (1st Harvard University Press pbk. ed.), Cambridge, Massachusetts: Harvard University Press, ISBN 9780674030916, LCCN 2008007143
- Sollors, Werner (1997), Neither black nor white yet both : thematic explorations of interracial literature, New York: Oxford University Press, ISBN 019505282X, LCCN 96007162
- Sollors, Werner (2014), The temptation of despair : tales of the 1940s, Cambridge, Massachusetts: The Belknap Press of Harvard University Press, ISBN 9780674052437, LCCN 2013037693
- Webb, Frank J. (2004), Sollors, Werner (ed.), Fiction, essays, poetry, edited & introduced by Werner Sollors (1st ed.), New Milford, CT: Toby Press, ISBN 1592640990, LCCN 2005279834
