= Secrets of the Code =

2006 documentary

- Directed by: Jonathan Stack
- Written by: Dan Burstein, Arthur Krystal
- Distributed by: Sony Pictures
- Release date: 2006
- Country: United States
- Language: English

Secrets of the Code is a 2006 documentary based on Dan Burstein's New York Times best-seller of the same name in which experts explore topics put forth by Dan Brown's novel The Da Vinci Code. New Yorker essayist Arthur Krystal assisted Burstein in writing the film, which was directed by Emmy Award winner Jonathan Stack, produced by Alchemist Films, LLC, and distributed by Sony Pictures.

The film is narrated by actress Susan Sarandon, with commentary by religious experts and authors Timothy Freke, Richard Leigh, Sean Martin and Elaine Pagels.

The film has been described as having unusually high visual quality, spectacular imagery and an excellent review of the issues.
