= The Thekla =

Cargo ship and night club in Bristol, UK

Coordinates: 51°26′57″N 2°35′43″W

The Old Profanity
- Thekla
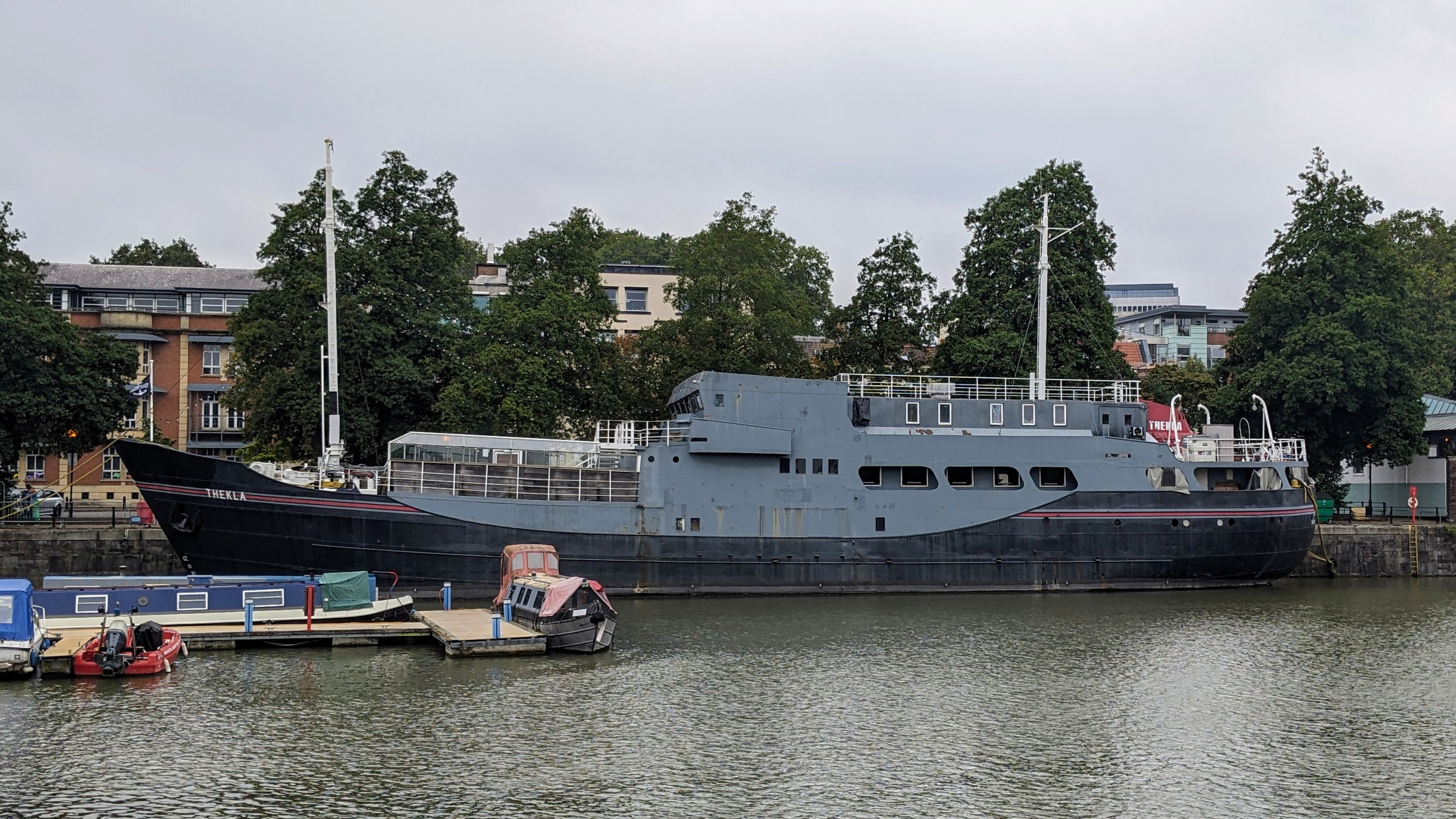
- Thekla in 2023

- Thekla, Bristol
- Address: Floating Harbour; Bristol; England
- Capacity: Variable
- Designation: Showboat
- Current use: Music venue
- Production: Visiting performances

Construction
- Opened: 1984; 42 years ago

Website
- www.theklabristol.co.uk

Thekla is a former cargo ship moored in the Mud Dock area of Bristol's Floating Harbour, England. The ship was built in Germany in 1958 and worked in the coastal trades.

In 1982 the ship was bought by Ki Longfellow-Stanshall, the wife of Vivian Stanshall, refitted, and brought to Bristol in 1983 as the Old Profanity Showboat. It was used as a theatre to showcase music of every sort, including cabaret, comedy, plays, musicals, and poetry events. The ship also contained an art gallery. The living quarters were home for Vivian, Ki, their daughter, Silky Longfellow-Stanshall, and Ki's daughter, Sydney Longfellow, as well as a few key personnel. During the 1990s, under new management, it was run as a rent-a-nightclub. The ship has now been returned to its original working name of Thekla and is run as a nightclub and venue for various bands by Daybrook House Promotions.

== Construction and working life ==
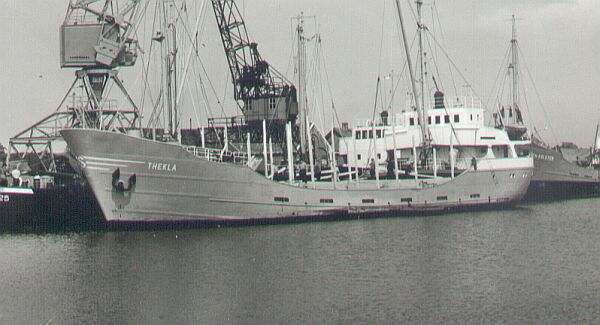
Thekla loading timber

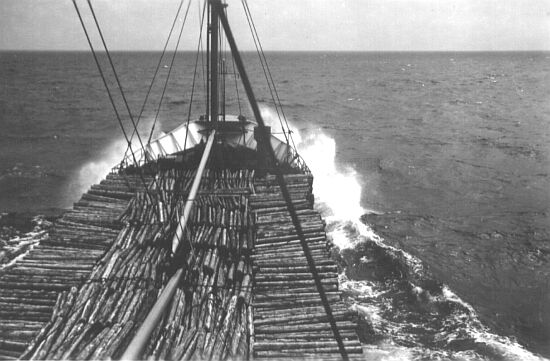
Thekla in high seas

Built in Yard No. 185, Thekla was launched on 12 July 1958 by Büsumer-Schiffswerft W & E Sielaff at Büsum, Schleswig-Holstein for the Schepers family of Haren/Ems. One of the last riveted ships to be produced (the hulls of metal ships have long been made by welding plates), she measured 424 gross registered tons and had a deadweight tonnage of 718 tons. Her overall length is 52.77 m (173 ft 2 in) and breadth 8.82 m (28 ft 11 in), with a 3.21 m (10 ft 6 in) draft. Thekla's hold was lined with Australian red jarrah, one of the hardest woods. With a single screw propulsion, she was powered by a 220 kW (300 bhp) diesel engine made by Bohn & Kähler, Kiel.

Thekla was a coastal trading vessel carrying a variety of cargoes between northern and western European ports, particularly timber from ports of the Baltic Sea. During her trading life, she remained on the ship register of Haren/Ems, passing in ownership from Johann Schepers to Josef Schôning and then Bernhard Schepers but with no change of name. After running aground at Gatesend, Norfolk, she was left rusting away for seven years in the half-abandoned docks of Sunderland on the eastern coast of England, before being purchased by the Stanshalls for £15,000.

== Converting a ship into a showboat ==
The Stanshalls bought the ship with a government-guaranteed loan. Refitted and covered in a new coat of black paint and white paint Thekla took six days and six nights to sail the 732 nautical miles (1,356 km) to Bristol, arriving on 4 August 1983. Her opening night on 1 May 1984 was filmed as an Omnibus BBC 1 documentary by the BBC.

For the next two and a half years, The Old Profanity Showboat put on over 240 theatrical productions. To support its theatre and cabaret (which seldom paid for itself), the Old Pro also provided a stage for bands. Within a year, the Old Pro was in use as a small theatre, jazz venue, folk club and cabaret.

By early 1986, Ki had become exhausted and wanted to go back to writing novels, and Vivian wanted to renew his recording career, and in August 1986 the showboat stopped putting on shows. The venue's management was overtaken by Peter Jackson & Andrew Price, who maintained it until its later purchase in 2006.

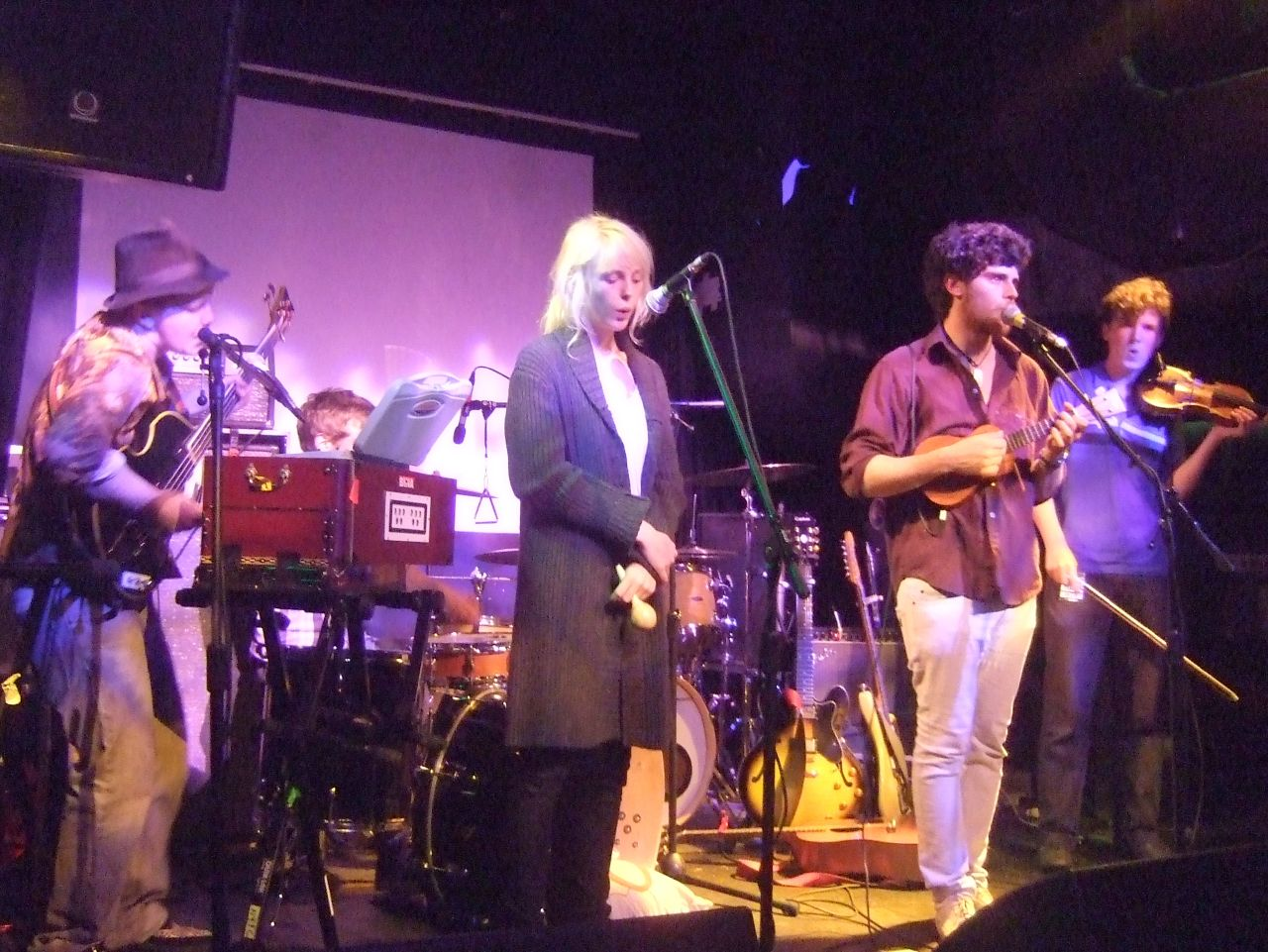
Noah and the Whale appearing on the Thekla in 2007

Throughout the 1990s and into the early 2000s, Thekla was taken over and run as an underground nightclub. The venue fell under fire for many noise complaints from nearby residents, leading Peter Jackson to defend its place in local court as its license to operate came under threat.

== Banksy & Inkie paintings ==
Work by the artist Banksy could once be seen stencilled over the bulkheads inside the club, as well as his much larger work on the outside of the hull at the waterline. This piece was painted over by the harbour master, much to the annoyance of the club's owners, who threatened the council and harbour master with legal action. Banksy returned to paint it again. The painting of the "Grim Reaper" is now on display at the M Shed. The space on the hull was replaced with artwork by Bristol-born artist, Inkie. The Banksy "Grim Reaper" is still used as key iconography by Thekla.

== Modern day operations ==
A refurbishment of the ship was completed in October 2006 after being purchased by Daybrook House Promotions (DHP). It remains at the moorings in central Bristol where it was first positioned in 1983 and continues to function as a music venue and nightclub. Artists such as Franz Ferdinand, The New York Dolls, Pete Doherty, Tokyo Police Club, The Growlers, Santigold, Wire, Kevin Coyne, The Chords in their final gig in the classic line-up, and iconic bands from all over the world as well as local acts from Bristol and Bath have played at Thekla since DHP purchased the venue. Artists that have played the boat since DHP's takeover include Stormzy, Phoebe Bridgers and James Marriott. The ship was repainted from black to cream and dark green.

A further £1 million refurbishment of the ship took place in the summer of 2019. For the extensive repairs, the venue was towed away from its historic spot in the harbour to Albion Drydock. The repairs included a brand-new steel offset hull, which was welded into place around the original hull. During this time the venue had to close, and took up temporary residency as "Thekla Faraway" in a bar on Small St in central Bristol - where its regular club nights continued until it was able to re-open in September that year. In 2020, the venue was forced to temporarily close as a result of the COVID-19 Pandemic. In accordance with government guidelines, the venue was able to periodically reopen for socially distant "Sit Down Sessions" of its regular club nights. The venue fully re-opened in July 2021.

Additional minor refurbishments to the vessel were made in August 2024 in its current docking.

In May 2024, the venue celebrated its 40th anniversary. An exhibition was held aboard featuring photo prints and talks from key figures in the venue's history. The celebration included the release of a limited edition photo-book titled The Complete History of Thekla, compiled by resident venue photographer David Jeffery-Hughes. The book serves as the most complete documentation of Thekla's history from construction to the present day.

== See also ==
- List of theatres in Bristol

== Footnotes ==
1. Thekla is still moored in Bristol's Floating Harbour, where she was docked in 1983. Today, she is used as a venue for bands and club nights.
2. No advertisements were ever placed anywhere. No one was ever actually interviewed and formally "hired." Thekla's people either came from the Bristol Old Vic Theatre School, or as customers ... and kept returning until a place was found for them.
3. The Bristol production of Stinkfoot was celebrated in print with Stinkfoot:An English Comic Opera by Sea Urchin Editions, with full script, song lyrics, cast, artwork by Stanshall, and an introduction by Ki.
4. It was not, he insisted, about Christmas, or for Christmas, and it certainly was not a pantomime, a very British style of entertainment traditionally put on in theatres over the Christmas period.
5. Stanshall called it his "awkestra".

== General references ==
- Venue: 24 Apr – edition of 3 May 2009, Bristol's "What's On" magazine.
- The Illustrated Vivian Stanshall, A Fairytale of Grimm Art, by Ki Longfellow-Stanshall.
