= Magical Mystery =

Studio album by Bud Shank
- Released: 1968
- Recorded: November 3 & 8, 1967
- Studio: Los Angeles, California
- Genre: Jazz
- Length: 34:53
- Label: World Pacific; WP 1873
- Producer: Richard Bock

Bud Shank chronology
Bud Shank Plays Music from Today's Movies (1967)	Magical Mystery (1968)	Windmills of Your Mind (1969)

Magical Mystery is an album by the saxophonist Bud Shank recorded in 1967 for the World Pacific label. The original album included one side interpreting Beatles' songs from the Magical Mystery Tour U.S. album and the other with contemporary pop hits.

== Reception ==
Professional ratings
Review scores
Source	Rating
AllMusic	3/5 stars

The Allmusic site awarded the album 3 stars.

== Track listing ==
1. "Blue Jay Way" (George Harrison) - 3:33
2. "I Am the Walrus" (John Lennon, Paul McCartney) - 2:54
3. "The Fool on the Hill" (Lennon, McCartney) - 3:41
4. "Flying" (Harrison, Lennon, McCartney, Richard Starkey) - 4:01
5. "Hello Goodbye" (Lennon, McCartney) - 3:23
6. "Your Mother Should Know" (Lennon, McCartney) - 2:47
7. "Paper Cup" (Jimmy Webb) - 3:00
8. "Windy" (Ruthann Friedman) - 2:54
9. "Never My Love" (Don Addrisi, Richard Addrisi) - 2:56
10. "I Wanna Be Free" (Tommy Boyce, Bobby Hart) - 2:19
11. "I Say a Little Prayer" (Burt Bacharach, Hal David) - 3:25

== Personnel ==
- Bud Shank – alto saxophone, flute
- Chet Baker – flugelhorn
- Gary Barone – flugelhorn
- Dennis Budimir – guitar
- Herb Ellis – guitar
- Robert West – double bass
- John Guerin – drums
- Victor Feldman – percussion
