= Blue Jay Way =

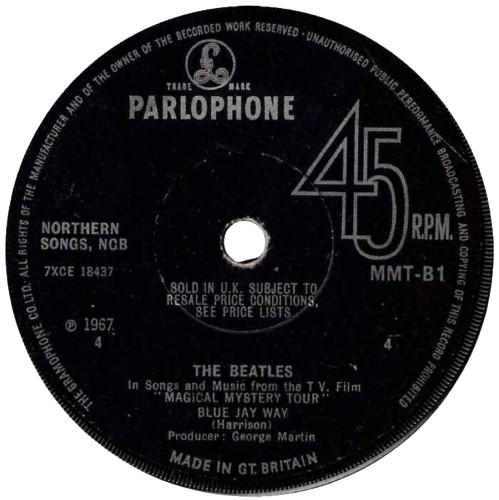
- 1967 UK EP face label

Song by the Beatles

from the EP and album Magical Mystery Tour
- Released: 27 November 1967 (US) (LP); 8 December 1967 (UK) (EP)
- Recorded: 6–7 September and 6 October 1967
- Studio: EMI, London
- Genre: Psychedelic rock
- Length: 3:54
- Label: Parlophone (UK), Capitol (US)
- Songwriter: George Harrison
- Producer: George Martin

Licensed audio
- "Blue Jay Way" on YouTube

"Blue Jay Way" is a song by the English rock band the Beatles. Written by George Harrison, it was released in 1967 on the group's Magical Mystery Tour EP and album. The song was named after a street in the Hollywood Hills neighborhood of Los Angeles where Harrison stayed in August 1967, shortly before visiting the Haight-Ashbury district of San Francisco. The lyrics document Harrison's wait for music publicist Derek Taylor to find his way to Blue Jay Way through the fog-ridden hills, while Harrison struggled to stay awake after the flight from London to Los Angeles.

As with several of Harrison's compositions from this period, "Blue Jay Way" incorporates aspects of Indian classical music, even though the Beatles used only Western instrumentation on the track, including a drone-like Hammond organ part played by Harrison. Created during the group's psychedelic period, the track makes extensive use of studio techniques such as flanging, Leslie rotary effect, and reversed tape sounds. The song appeared in the Beatles' 1967 television film Magical Mystery Tour, in a sequence that visually re-creates the sense of haziness and dislocation evident on the recording.

While some reviewers have dismissed the song as monotonous, several others have admired its yearning quality and dark musical mood. The website Consequence of Sound describes "Blue Jay Way" as "a haunted house of a hit, adding an ethereal, creepy mythos to the City of Angels". Artists who have covered the song include Bud Shank, Colin Newman, Tracy Bonham and Siouxsie and the Banshees.

== Background and inspiration ==
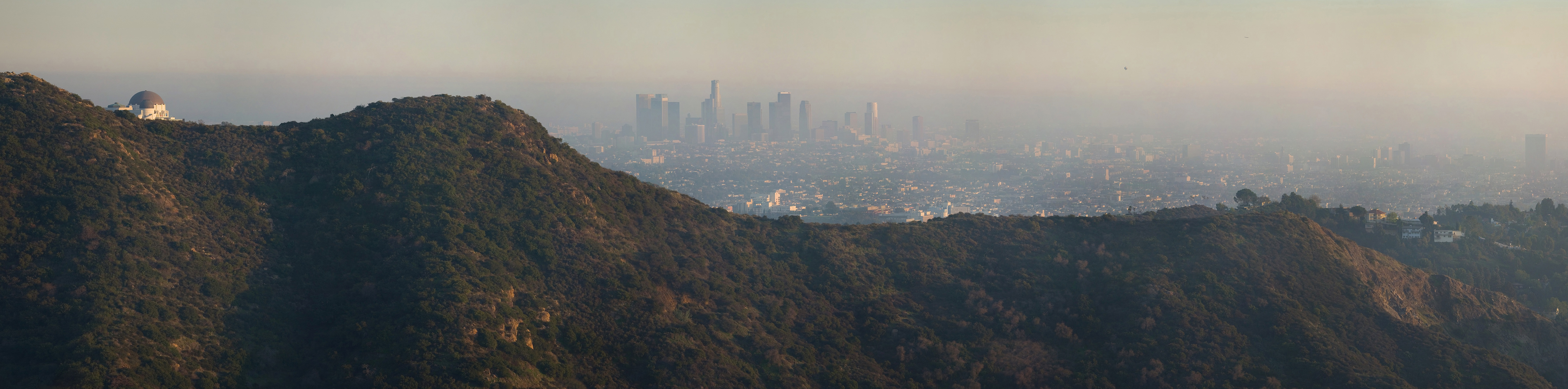
View of Los Angeles from Griffith Park, at the eastern end of the Hollywood Hills

George Harrison wrote "Blue Jay Way" after arriving in Los Angeles on 1 August 1967 with his wife Pattie Boyd and Beatles aides Neil Aspinall and Alex Mardas. The purpose of the trip was to spend a week with Derek Taylor, the Beatles' former press officer and eventual publicist for California-based acts such as the Byrds and the Beach Boys. The visit also allowed Harrison to reunite with his sitar tutor, Ravi Shankar, whose Kinnara School of Music and upcoming concert at the Hollywood Bowl he helped publicise.

I told [Derek Taylor] on the phone that the house was in Blue Jay Way … There was a fog and it got later and later. To keep myself awake, just as a joke to fill in time, I wrote a song about waiting for him in Blue Jay Way. There was a little Hammond organ in the corner of this rented house … I messed around on this and the song came.

— George Harrison to Hunter Davies, 1968

The title of the song came from a street named Blue Jay Way, one of the "bird streets" high in the Hollywood Hills West area overlooking the Sunset Strip, where Harrison had rented a house at 1567 Blue Jay Way for his stay. Jet-lagged after the flight from London, he began writing the composition on a Hammond organ as he and Boyd waited for Taylor and the latter's wife, Joan, to join them. The home's location, on a hillside of narrow, winding roads, together with the foggy conditions that night, created the backdrop for the song's opening lines: "There's a fog upon LA / And my friends have lost their way." Harrison had almost completed the song by the time the Taylors arrived, around two hours later than planned.

The week with Taylor proved to be important for the direction of the Beatles. At the height of the Summer of Love and the popularity of the band's Sgt. Pepper's Lonely Hearts Club Band album, Harrison, Taylor and their small entourage visited the international "hippie capital" of Haight-Ashbury, in San Francisco, on 7 August. Harrison had expected to encounter an enlightened community engaged in artistic pursuits and working to create a viable alternative lifestyle; instead, he was disappointed that Haight-Ashbury appeared to be populated by drug addicts, dropouts and "hypocrites". Following his return to England two days later, Harrison completed work on "Blue Jay Way" at his home in Esher, and he shared his disillusionment about Haight-Ashbury with John Lennon. The Beatles then publicly denounced the popular hallucinogen LSD (or "acid") and other drugs in favour of Transcendental Meditation under Maharishi Mahesh Yogi, whose seminar in Bangor in Wales the band attended in late August. While noting Harrison's role in "inspir[ing] the West's mainstream acquaintance with Hindu religion" through his leadership in this aspect of the Beatles' career, author Ian MacDonald describes "Blue Jay Way" as a "farewell to psychedelia", just as "It's All Too Much", which the Beatles recorded in May 1967, became Harrison's "farewell to acid".

== Composition ==
=== Music ===
"Blue Jay Way" was one of several songs that Harrison composed on a keyboard over 1966–68 – a period when, aside from in his work with the Beatles, he had abandoned his first instrument, the guitar, to master the sitar, partly under Shankar's tutelage. The song is in 4/4 time throughout; its structure consists of an intro, three combinations of verse and chorus, followed by repeated choruses. While MacDonald gives the musical key as "C major (minor, diminished)", musicologist Alan Pollack views it as a mix of C major and C modal, and comments on the "highly unusual" incorporation of the notes D♯ and F♯. The inclusion of the latter note suggests the Lydian mode, which, according to musicologist Walter Everett, had only been heard previously in popular music in the Left Banke's 1966 single "Pretty Ballerina".

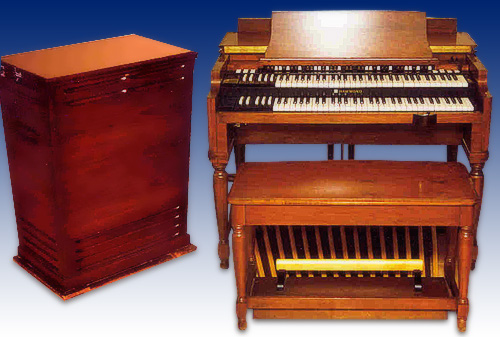
A Hammond B3 organ, beside a Leslie speaker cabinet. Both the Hammond organ and sound treatment via a Leslie speaker feature significantly on the Beatles' recording.

The song's melody oscillates over the chords of C major and C diminished, a chord favoured by Harrison in his Indian music-inspired compositions for the Beatles. Acknowledging Harrison's statement that the tune is "slightly Indian", Everett considers "Blue Jay Way" to be related to Kosalam and Multani – ragas from, respectively, the Carnatic and Hindustani traditions of Indian classical music. Alternatively, ethnomusicologist David Reck says the melody uses the scale from the Carnatic raga Ranjani, while according to author Simon Leng, Harrison based the song partly on the Hindustani Raga Marwa. (Note: Leng quotes John Barham, with whom Harrison began collaborating on the soundtrack album to the film Wonderwall in late 1967. Barham said that Harrison acknowledged his piano adaptation of Raga Marwa as an influence.) Following the inclusion of a raga-style introduction (or alap) in his previous Indian compositions, "Love You To" and "Within You Without You", "Blue Jay Way" begins with a preview of the song's melody played softly, in free time, over the opening drone. (Note: On the released recording, the Lydian-mode sharp 4th note (F♯) is first presented in the cello's brief appearance during this introduction (at 0:19). The same note then becomes a melodic feature as Harrison sings "Or I may be asleep", at the end of the choruses, and in the backing vocals on "Don't be long".) Author Ian Inglis credits the song's incorporation of ambient drone, specifically its role in providing "an anchorage point for vocal and instrumental improvisation", as one of the first examples of a musical device that soon became prevalent in the work of Fairport Convention, the Incredible String Band and other folk artists.

The length of the verses falls short of an even eight bars through the omission of a final beat. Pollack recognises this detail as reflecting a sense of impatience, in keeping with the circumstances surrounding the song's creation. Following the third verse–chorus combination, the outro comprises four rounds of the chorus, with the lyrics to the final round consisting of the repeated "Don't be long" refrain. As a feature that Pollack terms "compositionally impressive", each of the four sections in this outro varies in structure by being either shorter in length or less musically detailed.

=== Lyrics ===
The lyrics to "Blue Jay Way" relate entirely to Harrison's situation on that first night in Los Angeles. He refers to fighting off sleep and recalls his advice to Taylor to ask a policeman for directions to Blue Jay Way. Author Jonathan Gould views the song as "darkly funny", with the singer's concern over his friends' tardiness almost resembling "a metaphysical crisis". In the choruses, Harrison repeatedly urges "Please don't be long / Please don't you be very long", a refrain that Inglis identifies as central to the composition's "extraordinary sense of yearning and melancholy".

Taylor later expressed amusement at how some commentators interpreted "don't be long" as meaning "don't belong" – a message to Western youth to opt out of society – and at how the line "And my friends have lost their way" supposedly conveyed the idea that "a whole generation had lost direction". With regard to whether Harrison was telling contemporary listeners not to "belong", Inglis writes, this "alternative reading" of the song aligned with Timothy Leary's catchphrase for the 1960s American psychedelic experience, "Turn on, tune in, drop out". (Note: Despite the Beatles' public rejection of LSD before the song's release, Kris DiLorenzo of Trouser Press later described "Blue Jay Way" as "the archetypal acid song".) In Gould's opinion, the continual repetition of the line at the end of "Blue Jay Way" transforms the words into "a plea for nonattachment – 'don't belong'". Rather than attaching any countercultural significance to this, however, Gould views it as the Beatles repeating the wordplay first used in the chorus of Lennon's 1963 song "It Won't Be Long".

== Production ==
=== Recording ===
The Beatles began recording "Blue Jay Way" on 6 September 1967 at EMI Studios (now Abbey Road Studios) in London. The song was Harrison's contribution to the television film Magical Mystery Tour, the first project undertaken by the band following the death of their manager, Brian Epstein. (Note: Harrison was also credited as co-writer of the group composition "Flying", however.) Author Nicholas Schaffner describes "Blue Jay Way" as the first Harrison-written Beatles recording on which he "adapt[ed] some of his Indian-derived ideas to a more Western setting" through the choice of musical instruments. In the song's arrangement, Hammond organ re-creates the drone of a tambura, while a cello acts as an Indian sarod.

The group achieved a satisfactory rhythm track in a single take. On 7 September, this recording – comprising two organ parts, bass guitar and drums – was reduced to two tracks on the 4-track master tape, after which Harrison overdubbed his double-tracked lead vocal, and he, Lennon and Paul McCartney added backing vocals. Among Beatles biographers, MacDonald credits Harrison as the sole organ player on the song, while Kenneth Womack and John Winn write that Lennon played the second keyboard part. (Note: In Womack's description, Harrison and Lennon performed "a psychedelic duet of dueling Hammond organs".) Recording was completed at Abbey Road on 6 October, with the addition of tambourine, played by Ringo Starr, and cello. The latter was performed by an unnamed session musician. As with all the songs recorded for Magical Mystery Tour, final mixing was carried out on 7 November.

=== Studio effects ===
"Blue Jay Way" features extensive use of three studio techniques employed by the Beatles over 1966–67: flanging, an audio delay effect; sound-signal rotation via a Leslie speaker; and (in the stereo mix only) reversed tapes. Beatles historian Mark Lewisohn compares "Blue Jay Way" with two Lennon tracks from this period, "Strawberry Fields Forever" and "I Am the Walrus", in that the recording "seized upon all the studio trickery and technical advancements of 1966 and 1967 and captured them in one song". (Note: Lewisohn adds that, like the two Lennon-written tracks, the song "makes fascinating listening for anyone interested in what could be achieved in a 1967 recording studio". According to authors Jean-Michel Guesdon and Philippe Margotin, "'Blue Jay Way' was the only Beatles song to use practically all the effects available at that time.") Together with the pedal drone supplied by the keyboard parts, the various sound treatments reinforce the sense of dislocation evident in the song.

In the case of the reversed-tape technique, a recording of the completed track was played backwards and faded in at key points during the performance. This effect created a response to Harrison's lead vocal over the verses, as the backing vocals appear to answer each line he sings. Due to the limits of multitracking, the process of feeding in reversed sounds was carried out live during the final mixing session. Described by Lewisohn as "quite problematical", the process was not repeated when the Beatles and their production team worked on the mono mix.

== Appearance in Magical Mystery Tour film ==
Given the portentous reading of Taylor and his entourage "losing their way", it was easy to assume that Harrison wasn't being literal, but sermonizing on the idea of being spiritually lost ... Magical Mystery Tour seems to support that view by framing Harrison, as he sings the song, in a meditation pose refracted through a psychedelic prism.

— Author Kevin Courrier, 2009

The song's segment in Magical Mystery Tour was shot mainly at RAF West Malling, an air force base near Maidstone in Kent, during the week beginning on 19 September. (Note: With recording on the song incomplete at this point, Harrison mimed to a mix created at Abbey Road on 16 September.) Described by Womack as "the movie's hazy, psychedelic sequence", it features Harrison sitting on a pavement and playing a chalk-drawn keyboard. Dressed in a red suit, he is shown busking on a roadside; next to his keyboard are a white plastic cup and a message written in chalk, reading: "2 wives and kid to support". The depiction of Harrison, seated cross-legged, matched his public image as the most committed of the Beatles to Transcendental Meditation and Eastern philosophy.

Harrison performing in the "Blue Jay Way" film sequence

The filming took place in an aircraft hangar, with the scene designed to re-create a typically smog-ridden Los Angeles. Music journalist Kit O'Toole writes that the smoke surrounding Harrison "almost engulf[s] him, mimicking the 'fog' described in the lyrics". Through the use of prismatic photography, the "Blue Jay Way" segment also shows Harrison's "image refracted as if seen through a fly's eye", according to author Alan Clayson, who describes the scene as mirroring "the requisite misty atmosphere" suggested by the recording. (Note: In Gould's description, the effect "yields prismatic projections of George yogically floating on air".) In its preview of Magical Mystery Tour in 1967, the NME highlighted the segment as one of the film's "extremely clever" musical sequences, saying: "For 'Blue Jay Way' George is seen sitting cross-legged in a sweating mist which materialises into a variety of shapes and patterns. It's a pity that most TV viewers will be able to see it only in black and white."

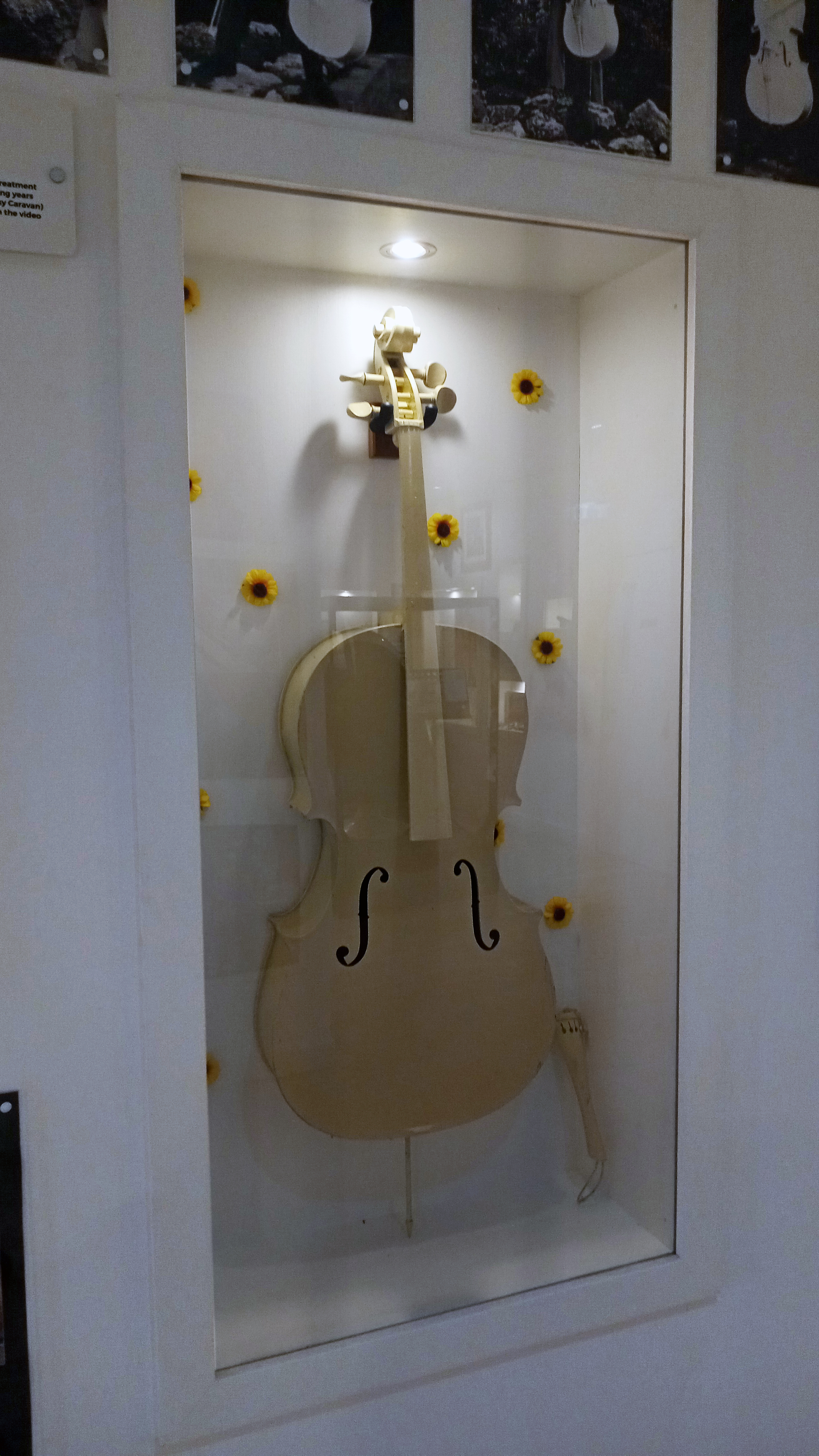
The cello featured in the "Blue Jay Way" film sequence, on display at the Liverpool Beatles Museum

At other times during the sequence, the four Beatles alternate in the role of a solo cellist. These scenes were filmed on 3 November, on the back rockery at Sunny Heights, Starr's house in Weybridge, Surrey. Tony Barrow, the band's press officer, recalled that as "a colourful conclusion" to the segment, they set off fireworks that had been bought for the upcoming Guy Fawkes Night celebrations. The version of "Blue Jay Way" appearing in the 2012 DVD release of Magical Mystery Tour is an alternative edit and includes some previously unused footage. O'Toole admires the "Blue Jay Way" sequence as "one of the film's too-few bright spots" and "a perfect representation of the track's hallucinatory qualities".

== Release and reception ==
"Blue Jay Way" was issued in Britain as the final song on the Magical Mystery Tour double EP on 8 December 1967. In America, where Capitol Records combined the six EP tracks with five songs issued on the band's singles throughout the year, creating a full album, the release took place on 27 November. Reck comments that despite the Beatles' association with the Maharishi and Eastern culture, only two of the six new songs – "Blue Jay Way" and "I Am the Walrus" – directly reflected this interest.

Reviewing the EP for the NME, Nick Logan considered it to be "Sergeant Pepper and beyond, heading for marvellous places", during which "we cruise down 'Blue Jay Way' with [Harrison] almost chanting the chorus line. A church organ starts this one off and leads us into a whirlpool of sound ..." Bob Dawbarn of Melody Maker lauded the record as "six tracks which no other pop group in the world could begin to approach for originality combined with the popular touch". He said "Blue Jay Way" had the "requisite Eastern overtones" and was a "sinister little tune", which made it the hardest track to appreciate immediately.

Among reviews of the US release, Mike Jahn of Saturday Review admired the album as a "description of the Beatles' acquired Hindu philosophy and its subsequent application to everyday life", while Hit Parader praised the band for further "widening the gap between them and 80 scillion other groups". The reviewer added, with reference to the concurrently issued Their Satanic Majesties Request by the Rolling Stones: "The master magicians practice their alchemy on Harrison's 'Blue Jay Way', recorded perhaps in an Egyptian tomb, and 'I Am The Walrus', a piece of terror lurking in foggy midnight moors. These two songs accomplish what the Stones attempted."

Richard Goldstein of The New York Times rued that, more so than Sgt. Pepper, the soundtrack demonstrated the Beatles' departure from true rock values in favour of studio effects, and he found artifice in the "waft of foggy music" accompanying Harrison's declaration that "There's a fog upon LA". Typically of Harrison's recent songs, Goldstein continued, "Blue Jay Way" was "filled with fascinating tones and textures" but the message was confused and laboured, and he complained that it was sung with a vocal that was "[more] sandpaper than Satori". Rex Reed, in a highly unfavourable review of the album for HiFi/Stereo Review, said the song "consists of three minutes and fifty seconds of the Beatles sounding as if they are singing under water or gargling with Listerine" and dismissed it as "boring as hell". By contrast, Robert Christgau wrote in Esquire that, despite three of the new songs being "disappointing", Magical Mystery Tour was "worth buying ... especially for Harrison's hypnotic 'Blue Jay Way'". Christgau described the track as "an adaptation of Oriental modes in which everything works, lyrics included".

== Retrospective assessments ==
A critic of the Beatles' output immediately post-Sgt. Pepper, Ian MacDonald found "Blue Jay Way" "as unfocused and monotonous as most of the group's output of this period", adding that the song "numbingly fails to transcend the weary boredom that inspired it". Writing for Rolling Stone in 2002, Greg Kot considered it to be "one of [Harrison's] least-memorable Beatles tracks … a song essentially about boredom – and it sounds like it". Similarly unimpressed with Magical Mystery Tour, Tim Riley describes "Blue Jay Way" as a song that "goes nowhere tiresomely", with a vocal that "sounds as tired and droning" as the musical accompaniment. In Walter Everett's view, the track's combination of unusual musical scales, reversed tape sounds and imaginative engineering makes it "the most mysterious Beatles sound between 'Strawberry Fields Forever' and 'Glass Onion'", but the lyrics are "dull" by comparison.

Ian Inglis writes that the emotion Harrison conveys on the track "belies its apparently trivial lyrics" and that, together with the instrumentation and backing vocals, his pleas "create an unusually atmospheric and strangely moving song". Writing for Rough Guides, Chris Ingham deems the song to be "essential Beatlemusic"; he views it as Harrison's "most haunting and convincing musical contribution of the period", after "Within You Without You", as well as "possibly the most unnerving of all Beatles tracks". In a 2002 review for Mojo, Charles Shaar Murray described the song as "eerie, serpentine" and "a fine and worthy companion for Pepper's Within You Without You". Writing in Uncut that same year, Carol Clerk called it "a weirdly atmospheric triumph".

What could have been a simple, maudlin ditty was transformed by The Beatles' studio process into an exotic, almost mystical journey. Harrison's vocal was treated until it sounded as if it was coming from beyond the grave ... Backwards tapes, droning organs, and a cello combined to heighten the Eastern atmosphere – without a single Indian instrument being employed.

— Peter Doggett, 2001

In his book Indian Music and the West, Gerry Farrell refers to the song when discussing its author's contribution to popularising Indian classical music, writing: "It is a mark of Harrison's sincere involvement with Indian music that, nearly thirty years on, the Beatles' 'Indian' songs remain among the most imaginative and successful examples of this type of fusion – for example, 'Blue Jay Way' and 'The Inner Light.'" Simon Leng writes of the song: "Harrison was working at a sophisticated level of extrapolating Indian scales to the Western setting, something no one else had done … 'Blue Jay Way' explores the structures of Indian music just as 'Within You Without You' debates its philosophical roots." Former Record Collector editor Peter Doggett, writing in Barry Miles' The Beatles Diary, similarly admires the recording, saying that the Beatles rendered the song "an exotic, almost mystical journey" that evokes a mysterious Eastern mood "without a single Indian instrument being employed". Music critic Jim DeRogatis ranks "Blue Jay Way" at number 7 in his list of the Beatles' best psychedelic rock songs.

In a 2009 review for Consequence of Sound, Dan Caffrey highlights the track among the "stellar moments in the album's first half" and considers it to be "George Harrison's most underrated song". Caffrey adds: "For a piece inspired by the simple act of waiting for a friend to arrive at his Los Angeles home on a foggy night, 'Blue Jay Way' is a haunted house of a hit, adding an ethereal, creepy mythos to the City of Angels." Writing for The A.V. Club, Chuck Klosterman describes the song as being among "the trippiest ... material [the Beatles] ever made", while Mark Kemp of Paste views it as "wonderfully wobbly". Scott Plagenhoef of Pitchfork includes "Blue Jay Way" among the EP's four "low-key marvels", saying: "Few of them are anyone's all-time favorite Beatles songs ... yet this run seems to achieve a majesty in part because of that: It's a rare stretch of amazing Beatles music that can seem like a private obsession rather than a permanent part of our shared culture."

In 2001, the song was ranked 39th on Uncut's list of "The 50 Greatest Beatles Tracks". Q magazine included it in their list of "The 500 Greatest Lost Tracks", published in 2007. In 2018, the music staff of Time Out London ranked "Blue Jay Way" at number 46 on their list of the best Beatles songs.

== Cover versions and cultural references ==
Lord Sitar included "Blue Jay Way" on his 1968 album of Indian music-style recordings, titled Lord Sitar. The artist credit was a pseudonym for London session guitarist Big Jim Sullivan, although rumours circulated that Lord Sitar was in fact Harrison himself, partly as a result of EMI/Capitol's refusal to deny the claim. (Note: Dee Long of the Canadian band Klaatu covered "Blue Jay Way" on the 2004 tribute album It Was 40 Years Ago Today: Tribute to the Beatles. In 1977, seven years after the Beatles' break-up, Capitol had similarly exploited rumours that Klaatu was the four ex-Beatles recording under a new name.) Also in 1968, jazz saxophonist and flautist Bud Shank, another associate of Ravi Shankar, recorded the song for his album Magical Mystery.

"Blue Jay Way" was a rare Beatles song released before their 1968 self-titled double album that Charles Manson adopted as part of his theory of an impending social revolution in the United States, a scenario that led to his followers carrying out a series of murders in Los Angeles during the summer of 1969. Finding parallels between the Beatles' lyrics and the Book of Revelation, and believing himself to be the messiah, Manson interpreted Harrison's opening verse and chorus as the Beatles calling out to Jesus Christ.

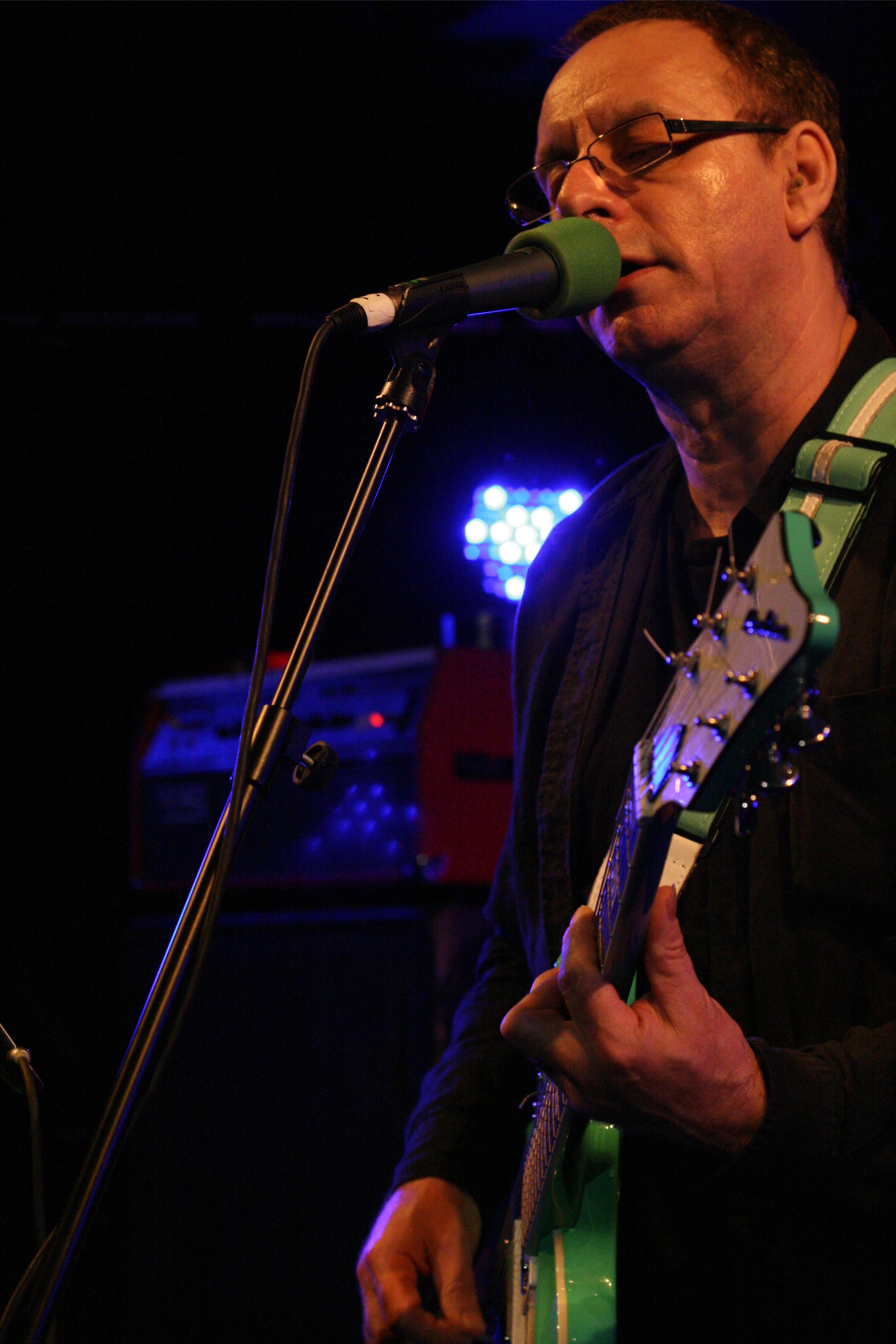
Colin Newman (pictured in 2011) covered the song on his 1982 album Not To.

Colin Newman, singer and guitarist with the post-punk band Wire, included a cover of "Blue Jay Way" on his 1982 solo album Not To. In March 2015, the song was his selection for the NME's "100 Greatest Beatles Songs" poll. Newman cited the track as an example of how the Beatles were "properly serious about their art" and why they now "need to be rescued from the clammy clutches of the heritage industry".

Borbetomagus released a live recording of the song on their 1992 album Buncha Hair That Long, a version that Trouser Press later said "could easily reunite the Beatles for good if it were played in the presence of the surviving trio". On their 2003 live album Seven Year Itch, Siouxsie and the Banshees included a reading that, according to The Guardian's reviewer, "transformed [the song] into an apocalyptic howl". Other artists who have covered "Blue Jay Way" include Tracy Bonham, on her 2007 album In the City + In the Woods, and the Secret Machines, whose version appears in the Julie Taymor-directed film Across the Universe (2007). Former Cars keyboardist Greg Hawkes recorded a ukulele rendition for his 2008 solo album The Beatles Uke.

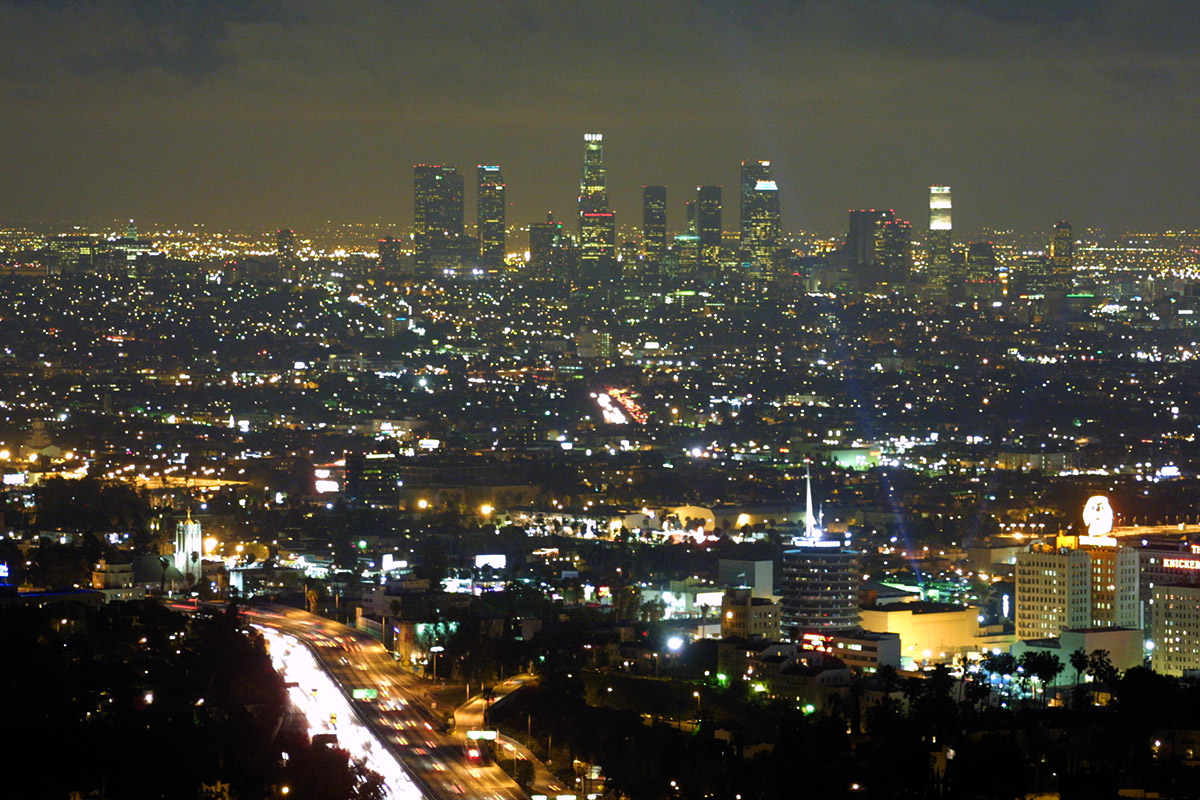
Downtown Los Angeles (viewed from the Hollywood Hills) – the city has continued to be associated with the Beatles' song.

Harrison's experience when writing "Blue Jay Way" is referenced in the Jonathan Kellerman novel Obsession (2007), as the lead character, Alex Delaware, waits among the "bird streets" overlooking Sunset Strip. The US hip hop group Death Grips included a reversed sample of "Blue Jay Way" as well as a quote from the song's lyrics in their 2012 track "Double Helix", released on The Money Store, an album that Clash magazine described as sounding like "the burning skies of LA's decaying empire".

In a 2011 interview, music producer and radio host Kim Fowley identified "Blue Jay Way" as the first song in which a member of the Beatles wrote about America and cited it as evidence of Harrison's standing as "the most American of all the Beatles" during the 1960s. Fowley highlighted this connection – including Harrison's friendships with David Crosby of the Byrds and other California-based musicians, such as Leon Russell – as the foundation for rock music's first all-star charity concert, the Concert for Bangladesh, which Harrison staged in New York in August 1971. (Note: According to former Guardian music critic Geoffrey Cannon, Harrison performed "Blue Jay Way" with Crosby, Stills & Nash in their London flat in the late 1960s, shortly before the trio's official formation.)

Due to the attention created by the Beatles' song, the street signs for Blue Jay Way have long been collector's items for fans visiting the Hollywood Hills. In May 2015, a lane in the Heavitree area of Exeter, in the English county of Devon, was named Blue Jay Way after the song. In addition to much of the filming for Magical Mystery Tour having taken place at various locations in the West Country, the title commemorates the Beatles' three concert appearances at Exeter's ABC Cinema over 1963–64.

== Personnel ==
According to Ian MacDonald, except where noted:

- George Harrison – lead vocals, Hammond organ, backing vocal
- John Lennon – backing vocal, Hammond organ
- Paul McCartney – backing vocal, bass guitar
- Ringo Starr – drums, tambourine
- Unnamed session musician – cello

== Sources ==
- Barrow, Tony (1999). The Making of The Beatles' Magical Mystery Tour. London: Omnibus Press. ISBN 0-7119-7575-2. No page numbers appear.
- The Beatles (2000). The Beatles Anthology. San Francisco, CA: Chronicle Books. ISBN 0-8118-2684-8.
- Bugliosi, Vincent; with Gentry, Curt (1994). Helter Skelter: The True Story of the Manson Murders. New York, NY: W.W. Norton. ISBN 0-393-08700-X.
- Castleman, Harry; Podrazik, Walter J. (1976). All Together Now: The First Complete Beatles Discography 1961–1975. New York, NY: Ballantine Books. ISBN 0-345-25680-8.
- Clayson, Alan (2003). George Harrison. London: Sanctuary. ISBN 1-86074-489-3.
- Courrier, Kevin (2009). Artificial Paradise: The Dark Side of the Beatles' Utopian Dream. Westport, CT: Praeger. ISBN 978-0-313-34586-9.
- Davies, Hunter (2009) [1968]. The Beatles (rev. edn). New York, NY: W.W. Norton. ISBN 978-0-393-33874-4.
- DeRogatis, Jim (2003). Turn on Your Mind: Four Decades of Great Psychedelic Rock. Milwaukee, WI: Hal Leonard. ISBN 978-0-634-05548-5.
- The Editors of Rolling Stone (2002). Harrison. New York, NY: Rolling Stone Press. ISBN 978-0-7432-3581-5.
- Everett, Walter (1999). The Beatles as Musicians: Revolver Through the Anthology. New York, NY: Oxford University Press. ISBN 978-0-19-512941-0.
- Farrell, Gerry (1997). Indian Music and the West. London: Oxford University Press. ISBN 978-0-19-816717-4.
- Gould, Jonathan (2007). Can't Buy Me Love: The Beatles, Britain and America. London: Piatkus. ISBN 978-0-7499-2988-6.
- Greene, Joshua M. (2006). Here Comes the Sun: The Spiritual and Musical Journey of George Harrison. Hoboken, NJ: John Wiley & Sons. ISBN 978-0-470-12780-3.
- Guesdon, Jean-Michel; Margotin, Philippe (2013). All the Songs: The Story Behind Every Beatles Release. New York, NY: Black Dog & Leventhal. ISBN 978-1-57912-952-1.
- Harrison, George (2002). I, Me, Mine. San Francisco, CA: Chronicle Books. ISBN 978-0-8118-5900-4.
- Ingham, Chris (2006). The Rough Guide to the Beatles (2nd edn). London: Rough Guides/Penguin. ISBN 978-1-84836-525-4.
- Inglis, Ian (2010). The Words and Music of George Harrison. Santa Barbara, CA: Praeger. ISBN 978-0-313-37532-3.
- Kellerman, Jonathan (2008). Obsession. New York, NY: Ballantine Books. ISBN 978-0-345-45264-1.
- Lavezzoli, Peter (2006). The Dawn of Indian Music in the West. New York, NY: Continuum. ISBN 0-8264-2819-3.
- Leng, Simon (2006). While My Guitar Gently Weeps: The Music of George Harrison. Milwaukee, WI: Hal Leonard. ISBN 978-1-4234-0609-9.
- Lewisohn, Mark (1992). The Complete Beatles Chronicle. London: Hamlyn. ISBN 0-600-61001-2.
- Lewisohn, Mark (2005). The Complete Beatles Recording Sessions: The Official Story of the Abbey Road Years 1962–1970. London: Bounty Books. ISBN 978-0-7537-2545-0.
- MacDonald, Ian (1998). Revolution in the Head: The Beatles' Records and the Sixties. London: Pimlico. ISBN 978-0-7126-6697-8.
- Miles, Barry (2001). The Beatles Diary Volume 1: The Beatles Years. London: Omnibus Press. ISBN 0-7119-8308-9.
- Mojo Special Limited Edition: 1000 Days That Shook the World (The Psychedelic Beatles – April 1, 1965 to December 26, 1967). London: Emap. 2002.
- Pedler, Dominic (2003). The Songwriting Secrets of the Beatles. London: Omnibus Press. ISBN 978-0-7119-8167-6.
- Reck, David (2008). "The Beatles and Indian Music". In Julien, Olivier (ed.). Sgt. Pepper and the Beatles: It Was Forty Years Ago Today. Aldershot, UK: Ashgate. ISBN 978-0-7546-6249-5.
- Riley, Tim (2002) [1988]. Tell Me Why – The Beatles: Album by Album, Song by Song, the Sixties and After. Cambridge, MA: Da Capo Press. ISBN 978-0-306-81120-3.
- Sanders, Ed (2002). The Family. New York, NY: Thunder's Mouth Press. ISBN 1-56025-396-7.
- Schaffner, Nicholas (1978). The Beatles Forever. New York, NY: McGraw-Hill. ISBN 0-07-055087-5.
- Shankar, Ravi (1999). Raga Mala: The Autobiography of Ravi Shankar. New York, NY: Welcome Rain. ISBN 1-56649-104-5.
- Shea, Stuart; Rodriguez, Robert (2007). Fab Four FAQ: Everything Left to Know About the Beatles ... and More!. New York, NY: Hal Leonard. ISBN 978-1-4234-2138-2.
- Tillery, Gary (2011). Working Class Mystic: A Spiritual Biography of George Harrison. Wheaton, IL: Quest Books. ISBN 978-0-8356-0900-5.
- Turner, Steve (1999). A Hard Day's Write: The Stories Behind Every Beatles Song (2nd edn). New York, NY: Carlton/HarperCollins. ISBN 0-06-273698-1.
- Winn, John C. (2009). That Magic Feeling: The Beatles' Recorded Legacy, Volume Two, 1966–1970. New York, NY: Three Rivers Press. ISBN 978-0-307-45239-9.
- Woffinden, Bob (1981). The Beatles Apart. London: Proteus. ISBN 0-906071-89-5.
- Womack, Kenneth (2014). The Beatles Encyclopedia: Everything Fab Four. Santa Barbara, CA: ABC-CLIO. ISBN 978-0-313-39171-2.
