= Magical Mystery Tour (film) =

1967 British TV film starring The Beatles

- The 1988 VHS release cover art
- Genre: Comedy; Experimental; Surreal humour Musical
- Written by: The Beatles
- Directed by: The Beatles
- Starring: The Beatles
- Narrated by: John Lennon
- Composer: The Beatles
- Country of origin: United Kingdom
- Original language: English

Production
- Producer: Denis O'Dell
- Cinematography: Richard Starkey M.B.E.
- Editor: Roy Benson
- Running time: 52 minutes
- Production companies: Apple Corps; BBC

Original release
- Network: BBC1
- Release: 26 December 1967

Magical Mystery Tour is a 1967 British made-for-television musical film written, produced, directed by, and starring the Beatles. It is the third film that starred the band and depicts a group of people on a coach tour (including the band members) who experience strange happenings caused by magicians (also played by the band as well as road manager Mal Evans). The premise was inspired by Ken Kesey's Furthur adventures with the Merry Pranksters and the then-popular coach trips from Liverpool to see the Blackpool Lights. Paul McCartney is credited with conceptualising and leading the project.

Much of Magical Mystery Tour was shot in and around RAF West Malling, a decommissioned military airfield in Kent, and the script was largely improvised. Shooting proceeded on the basis of a mostly handwritten collection of ideas, sketches and situations. The film is interspersed with musical interludes, which include the Beatles performing "I Am the Walrus" wearing animal masks and the Bonzo Dog Doo-Dah Band performing Vivian Stanshall and Neil Innes' "Death Cab for Cutie".

The film originally aired on BBC1, in black-and-white, on Boxing Day, 26 December 1967. A colour transmission followed on BBC2 on 5 January 1968. It received mixed reviews, although its accompanying soundtrack was a commercial and critical success. The film received an American theatrical release in 1974 by New Line Cinema, and in select theatres worldwide in 2012 by Apple Films.

== Background ==
The film was an attempt to combine the free-wheeling fun of Ken Kesey's 1964 cross-country American bus tour aboard Furthur with the Merry Pranksters, and the then-popular coach (bus) trips from Liverpool to see the Blackpool Lights. John Lennon stated that "if stage shows were to be out, we wanted something to replace them. Television was the obvious answer." Most of the band members have said that the initial idea was Paul McCartney's, although he stated, "I'm not sure whose idea Magical Mystery Tour was. It could have been mine, but I'm not sure whether I want to take the blame for it! We were all agreed on it – but a lot of the material at that time could have been my idea." According to McCartney, he had been creating home movies and this was a source of inspiration for Magical Mystery Tour.

The script of Magical Mystery Tour was largely improvised. The Beatles gathered together a group of people for the cast and camera crew, and told them to "be on the coach on Monday morning". Ringo Starr recalled: "Paul had a great piece of paper – just a blank piece of white paper with a circle on it. The plan was: 'We start here, and we've got to do something here …' We filled it in as we went along."

== Plot ==
The situation is that of a group of people on a British mystery tour in a 1967 coach, focusing mostly on Richard B. Starkey and his recently widowed Auntie Jessie. Other group members on the bus include the tour director, Jolly Jimmy Johnson; the tour hostess, Miss Wendy Winters; the conductor, Buster Bloodvessel; and the other Beatles.

During the course of the tour, "strange things begin to happen" at the whim of "four or five magicians", four of whom are played by the Beatles themselves and the fifth by the band's long-time road manager Mal Evans.

During the journey, Starkey and his Aunt Jessie argue continually. Aunt Jessie begins to have daydreams of falling in love with Buster Bloodvessel, who displays increasingly eccentric and disturbing behaviour. The tour involves several strange activities, such as an impromptu race in which each of the passengers employs a different mode of transportation (some run, a few jump into cars, a group of people pedal a long bike, while Starkey ends up beating them all with the bus). In one scene, the tour group walk through what appears to be a British Army recruitment office and are greeted by the army drill sergeant. The sergeant, shouting incomprehensibly, appears to instruct the assembled onlookers on how to attack a stuffed cow.

The tour group also crawl into a tiny tent in a field, inside which is a projection theatre. A scene in a restaurant shows a waiter, named Pirandello (also played by Lennon), continuously shoveling spaghetti onto the table in front of Aunt Jessie, while arriving guests step out from a lift and walk across the dining tables. The film continues with the tour's male passengers watching a strip show (Jan Carson of the Raymond Revuebar). The film ends with the Beatles dressed in white tailcoats, highlighting a glamorous old-style dance crowd scene, accompanied by the song "Your Mother Should Know".

The film is interspersed with musical interludes, which include the Beatles performing "I Am the Walrus" wearing animal masks, Harrison singing "Blue Jay Way" while waiting on Blue Jay Way Road, and the Bonzo Dog Doo-Dah Band performing Vivian Stanshall and Neil Innes' "Death Cab for Cutie" sung by Stanshall.

== Cast ==
- John Lennon as John, Magician #1 (Magician with Coffee), Ticket Salesman, The Eggman, Pirandello the Waiter, and The Narrator
- Paul McCartney as Paul, Magician #2 (Painted Nose Magician), and Major McCartney
- George Harrison as George and Magician #3 (Magician Looking Through Telescope)
- Ringo Starr as Richard and Magician #4 (Talkative Magician)
- Jessie Robins (as Jessie Robbins) as Auntie Jessie
- Derek Royle as Jolly Jimmy Johnson
- Miranda Forbes (as Mandy Weet) as Miss Wendy Winters
- Ivor Cutler as Buster Bloodvessel
- Mal Evans as Magician #5 (Magician Standing in the Corner) and a Passenger on the Bus
- Victor Spinetti as Sergeant Spinetti
- Neil Aspinall as Man with Hat on the Roadside
- Nat Jackley as Rubber Man
- Nicola Hale as Little Girl
- George Claydon as Photographer
- Maggie Wright as Starlet
- Shirley Evans as Accordionist
- Jan Carson as Stripper
- Bonzo Dog Doo-Dah Band as themselves

== Production ==
=== Filming ===
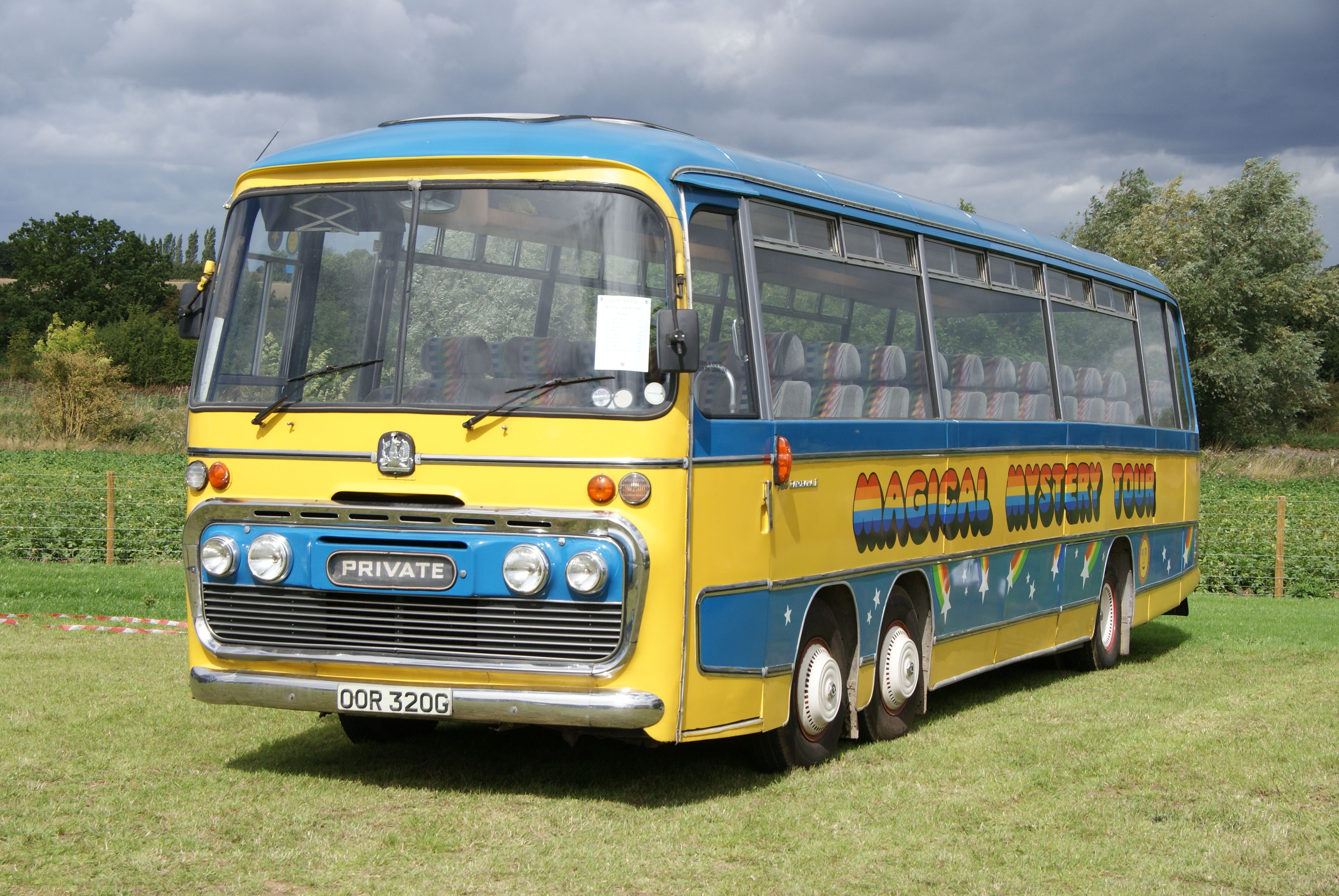
Replica bus of the same type and livery used in the film

Shooting proceeded on the basis of a mostly handwritten collection of ideas, sketches and situations, which McCartney called the "Scrupt". Magical Mystery Tour was ultimately the shortest of all Beatles films, although almost ten hours of footage was shot over a two-week period. The core of the film was shot between 11 September and 25 September 1967.

Lennon recalled in a later interview, "We knew most of the scenes we wanted to include, but we bent our ideas to fit the people concerned, once we got to know our cast. If somebody wanted to do something we hadn't planned, they went ahead. If it worked, we kept it in." At one point, Lennon had a dream in which he was a waiter piling spaghetti on a woman's plate, so the sequence was filmed and included in the movie. Some of the older actors, such as Nat Jackley, were not familiar with productions without a script and were disappointed by the lack of one.

Much of Magical Mystery Tour was shot in and around RAF West Malling, a decommissioned military airfield in Kent, as it was not possible to book any London film studio at short notice. Many of the interior scenes, such as the ballroom sequence for "Your Mother Should Know", were filmed in the disused aircraft hangars. The exteriors, such as the "I Am the Walrus" sequence and the impromptu race, were shot on the runways and taxi aprons. RAF Air Training Corps cadets can be seen marching in some scenes, and during "I Am the Walrus" an RAF Avro Shackleton is seen flying above the group. Some scenes were also shot in the nearby town of West Malling.

The mystery tour itself was shot throughout the West Country of England, including Devon and Cornwall, including three days filming women in bikinis at the Atlantic Hotel, Newquay. Most of the footage was not used in the finished film. The striptease sequence was shot at Paul Raymond's Raymond Revuebar in London's Soho district, and the sequence for "The Fool on the Hill" was shot around Nice, in the south of France.

The coach used in the film, a Plaxton-bodied Bedford VAL, carried the registration number URO 913E. The vehicle was new to coach company Fox of Hayes in 1967. The Hard Rock Cafe acquired the coach in 1988, and the vehicle is now completely refurbished. In the race sequence, Starr himself drives the bus around the airfield racetrack. During the filming, an ever greater number of cars followed the colourful, hand-lettered bus hoping to see what its passengers were up to, until a running traffic jam developed. The spectacle ended after Lennon angrily tore the lettering off the sides of the bus.

=== Editing ===
The eleven weeks that followed shooting were mostly spent on editing the film from ten hours to 52 minutes. Scenes that were filmed but not included in the final cut include:

- A sequence where ice cream, fruit and lollipops were sold to the Beatles and other coach passengers;
- Lennon, McCartney, Harrison and Starr each looking through a telescope;
- Happy Nat the Rubber Man (Nat Jackley, especially recruited for his 'funny walks', which the Beatles had long been drawn to) chasing women around the Atlantic Hotel's outdoor swimming pool, a sequence which Lennon directed;
- Mr. Bloodvessel (Ivor Cutler) performing "I'm Going in a Field"; and
- The band Traffic performing their song "Here We Go Round the Mulberry Bush".

For the psychedelic visual sequence during the song "Flying", some of the flying footage from Stanley Kubrick's 1964 film Dr. Strangelove was re-used. As told by editor Roy Benson in the BBC Radio Documentary "Celluloid Beatles", the film lacked footage to cover the sequence for the song "Flying". Benson had access to the aerial footage filmed for the Dr. Strangelove B52 sequences, which was stored at Shepperton Studios. The use of the footage prompted Kubrick to call Benson to complain.

== Reception ==
Magical Mystery Tour was viewed negatively by not only critics, but also by many Beatles fans for, as Ultimate Classic Rock journalist Dave Swanson described it, "its stream-of-consciousness style." In addition, it was broadcast in the UK on 26 December on BBC1, which at the time only broadcast in black and white for technical reasons. George Martin, the band's producer, later said: "When it came out originally on British television, it was a colour film but shown in black and white, because they didn't have colour on BBC1 in those days. So it looked awful and was a disaster." Lennon later said: "What the BBC – stupid idiots – did, they showed it in black and white first. Can you imagine, around Christmas? And then they [the critics] reviewed it in black and white. It's like reviewing a mono version of a stereo record." It was the Beatles' first critical failure. The film had a repeated showing on 5 January 1968, this time broadcast in colour, on BBC2, but there were only about 200,000 colour TV receivers in the UK at the time. As a result of the unfavourable reviews, networks in the US declined to show the film there. Beatles aide Peter Brown blamed McCartney for its failure. Brown said that during a private screening for NEMS management staff, the reaction had been "unanimous ... it was awful", yet McCartney was convinced that the film would be warmly received, and ignored Brown's advice to scrap the project and save the band from embarrassment.

On 27 December, McCartney appeared on ITV's The David Frost Programme to defend the film. He was introduced by David Frost as the "man most responsible" for Magical Mystery Tour. Hunter Davies, the Beatles' official biographer at the time, said: "It was the first time in memory that any artist felt obliged to make a public apology for his work." McCartney later spoke to the press, saying: "We don't say it was a good film. It was our first attempt. If we goofed, then we goofed. It was a challenge and it didn't come off. We'll know better next time." He also said, "I mean, you couldn't call the Queen's speech a gas, either, could you?" Writing in 1981, sociomusicologist Simon Frith said that the film was symptomatic of the transformation of "pop" into "rock", the latter being concerned with art and self-expression over mass entertainment. He described Magical Mystery Tour as "a willfully inexplicable TV special which put most of the audience to sleep" and added: "The Beatles were no longer in control of their time. Whereas they had once been able to seize on any idea and 'Beatlefy' it, make it common currency, they were now running vainly after a trend that was determined to leave the common audience behind."

1974 re-release US theatrical film poster for Magical Mystery Tour by New Line Cinema, Mystical Films

Magical Mystery Tour had its first US presentation at the Fillmore East in New York City on 11 August 1968, shown at 8 and 10 pm, as part of a fundraiser for the Liberation News Service. It was not seen in commercial theatres in the US until 1974, when New Line Cinema acquired the rights for limited theatrical and non-theatrical distribution.

McCartney later said of the film: "Looking back on it, I thought it was all right. I think we were quite pleased with it." He also commented in The Beatles Anthology DVD that the film features the band's only video performance of "I Am the Walrus". In a 1993 interview, Harrison said the negative response from the press was "understandable too because it wasn't a brilliant scripted thing that was executed well. It was like a little home movie, really. An elaborate home movie." As of 2019, the film carries a 64% approval rating at the review aggregator website Rotten Tomatoes, based on 14 reviews from professional critics, with an average rating of 5.3/10.

In The Electric Kool-Aid Acid Test, Tom Wolfe comments on the similarity between Magical Mystery Tour and the exploits of Ken Kesey and the Merry Pranksters. In 1978, the film was parodied by the Rutles in their Tragical History Tour, "a self-indulgent TV movie about four Oxford history professors on a tour around Rutland tea-shops". In his Diaries 1969–1979: The Python Years, Michael Palin said that the Monty Python team had considered showing the film, which by then had become commercially forgotten, as a curtain-raiser to their own 1975 comedy film Monty Python and the Holy Grail. They received permission from all four Beatles to view the film again, and did so at the Apple offices on 10 January 1975. Although the Pythons were interested, the idea did not go ahead.

Following the January 1968 colour screening, the film was not televised in the UK until 21 December 1979, when it opened BBC2's "The Beatles at Christmas" season. Its next UK broadcast took place on 1 November 1993 as part of MTV Europe's "Beatles Day".

== Comic strip adaptation ==
A comic strip adaptation of the film's plot was drawn by British caricaturist Bob Gibson and printed in the sleeve of the Magical Mystery Tour soundtrack album.

== Restoration ==
The critical reception in 1967 had been so poor that no one had bothered to properly archive a negative, and later re-release versions had to be copied from poor-quality prints. By the end of the 1980s, MPI Media Group, through rights holder Apple Corps, had released the movie on VHS and laserdisc (with a new stereo remix by producer George Martin), and a DVD release followed many years later. It was also released in the VHS format.

A digitally restored version of the film was broadcast in the UK on BBC Two and BBC HD on 6 October 2012, following an Arena documentary on its making. Both were shown in the United States as part of Great Performances on PBS ten weeks later on 14 December.

On 22 August 2012, Apple Corps (via Apple Films) announced a re-release of the film on DVD and Blu-ray along with a limited theatrical release, remastered with 5.1 surround sound. The DVD/Blu-ray was released on 8 October worldwide, with the exception of North America (9 October). The new release included an audio commentary from McCartney and special features including interviews (from former Beatles and others involved with the project) and never-before-seen footage. Also released is a deluxe edition "collectors box" featuring the film on both DVD and Blu-ray, in addition to a 60-page book, and a reproduction of the original mono UK double 7" vinyl EP.

The 2012 remastered Magical Mystery Tour DVD entered the Billboard Top Music Video chart at number 1 for the week ending 27 October 2012.

== Songs ==
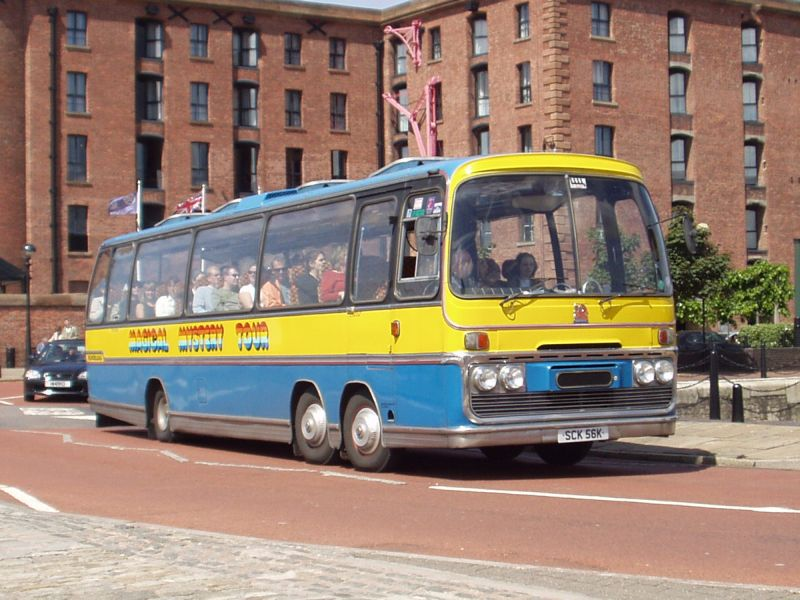
A coach of the same model used in the film, painted in Magical Mystery Tour livery, in Liverpool

The songs in order of their use in the movie, written by Lennon-McCartney unless otherwise indicated:

1. "Magical Mystery Tour"
2. "The Fool on the Hill"
3. "She Loves You" (played on a fairground organ, part of the general medley of background music during the impromptu race)
4. "Flying" (Lennon/McCartney/George Harrison/Richard Starkey)
5. "All My Loving" (background music, orchestrated in the style of the "Pas de deux" section from Tchaikovsky's The Nutcracker ballet)
6. "I Am the Walrus"
7. "Jessie's Dream" (an instrumental, not released on any official audio recording)
8. "Blue Jay Way" (Harrison)
9. "Death Cab for Cutie" (performed by the Bonzo Dog Doo-Dah Band) (Vivian Stanshall/Neil Innes)
10. "Your Mother Should Know"
11. "Magical Mystery Tour (Reprise)" (credited as "part of the full Magical Mystery Tour", but this is not the case)
12. "Hello, Goodbye" (part, finale played over end credits)

The performance of "She Loves You" is from the 1965 album Irvin's 89 Key Marenghi Fair Organ Plays Lennon & McCartney. Also used as background music during the race sequence is a portion of "Overture, Zampa" from the 1959 album Champion Bandstand No. 3 by Munn and Felton's (Footwear) Band. The performance of "All My Loving" is from the 1965 album Beatle Cracker Suite by Arthur Wilkinson and His Orchestra.

During the bus ride, the passengers sing a medley of songs including "Toot, Toot, Tootsie (Goo' Bye!)," "The Happy Wanderer," "When Irish Eyes Are Smiling," "When the Red, Red Robin (Comes Bob, Bob, Bobbin' Along)," "Never on Sunday," and the "Infernal Galop" from Orpheus in the Underworld.

== Home media ==
US

Year	Company	Format(s)	Comments
1978	Media Home Entertainment	VHS/Betamax	Originally taken off the market due to a successful lawsuit filed in 1980, Media and Northern later reached an agreement for its re-release one year later. Unique Identification info: Title song has a unique voice track "roll-up roll-up" introduction by Lennon and first scenes of the bus zooming in and out show stars with scratchy lines above, to show a falling effect. Overall film has washed-out colour and audio that is not very high quality. Film is presented in the wrong 23.976fps presentation.
1988	Video Collection/Apple	VHS and Laserdisc	With a digitally re-mixed and remastered soundtrack by producer George Martin. Unique Identification info: Title song still has the unique voice track "roll-up roll-up" introduction (now in clean remixed stereo) and first scenes of the bus zooming in and out still show stars with scratchy lines above to show a falling effect (later releases change this). Overall film has much sharper colour and remixed Dolby Stereo audio with nice separation and quality. This release's collector importance is the clean stereo version of the title song with the unique voice track intro - which in future releases will no longer be used. Film is now presented in the correct 25fps presentation.
1992	MPI/Apple	Laserdisc	
1997	MPI/Apple	DVD	First DVD release of Magical Mystery Tour. Unique Identification info: Title song now uses the standard album song version with its standard "roll-up roll-up" introduction, and first scenes of the bus zooming in and out with falling stars has been removed and replaced with a looping of the intro graphic. Overall film video is the same cleaned up 1988 VHS release and the audio (after the title song mix change) retains the same standard stereo remixing as well (no surround 5.1 mixes).
2003	Avenue One	DVD	Bootleg of the MPI DVD.
2012	Apple/Capitol	DVD	
2012	Apple/Capitol	Blu-ray	First Blu-ray release of Magical Mystery Tour. Unique Identification info: Title song still uses the standard album song version, with its familiar "roll-up roll-up" introduction, and first scenes of the bus zooming in and out with falling stars has been restored, yet the falling stars do not show the scratched vertical lines above them. Overall film video is cleaned up to 2012 technology standards and the audio has been remixed to include a new 5.1 surround sound mix in various formats. This version also includes new bonus features such as a Director's Commentary by Paul McCartney.

UK

Year	Company	Format(s)	Comments
1981	Empire Films	VHS	Taken from an existing poor quality print, the film appears with washed-out colour and poor audio quality.
1988	MPI/Apple	VHS and Laserdisc	With a digitally re-mixed and remastered soundtrack by George Martin
1997	MPI/Apple	DVD	First DVD release of Magical Mystery Tour
2012	Apple/EMI	DVD	
2012	Apple/EMI	Blu-ray	First Blu-ray release of Magical Mystery Tour

== Legacy ==
- Ivor Cutler's role as Mr Bloodvessel would be the inspiration for the stage name of British Singer Buster Bloodvessel of the English Two-tone Ska Band Bad Manners
