= Bob Gibson (artist) =

British visual artist

Robert Michael Gibson (1938 – September 2010) was a British caricaturist, artist and illustrator who is best known for creating the illustrations and album art that appears in The Beatles' 1967 LP and EP Magical Mystery Tour, released on Capitol Records and Parlophone Records. Inside the sleeve he also created a text comic based on the film Magical Mystery Tour. He also made graphic contributions to the Beatles monthly magazine The Beatles Book. He died in September 2010.
