= Death Cab for Cutie (song) =

1967 novelty song by the Bonzo Dog Doo-Dah Band

"Death Cab For Cutie"

Song by Bonzo Dog Doo-Dah Band

from the album Gorilla
- Released: October 1967
- Genre: Rock and roll; satire
- Length: 2:56
- Label: Liberty Records; BGO Records (Reissue)
- Songwriters: Vivian Stanshall and Neil Innes
- Producers: Gerry Bron, Lyn Birkbeck

"Death Cab for Cutie" is a song composed by Vivian Stanshall and Neil Innes and performed by the Bonzo Dog Doo-Dah Band. It was included on their 1967 album Gorilla.

== Content ==
Innes's inspiration for the song was the title of a story in an old American pulp fiction crime magazine he came across at a street market. Stanshall's primary contribution was to shape "Death Cab for Cutie" as a parody of Elvis Presley (notably Presley's 1957 hit "(Let Me Be Your) Teddy Bear"), and he sang it as such, with undertones of 1950s doo-wop. In the style of several early teenage tragedy songs, such as "Teen Angel", it tells a story of youthful angst. "Cutie", who goes out on the town against her lover's wishes ("Last night Cutie caught a cab, uhuh-huh ..."), is killed when the taxicab she is in runs a red light and crashes. In the last line of the chorus, the narrator notes that 'someone' is going to make Cutie pay her fare – i.e., end up dead.

== Performances ==
The song became one of the Bonzo Dog Band's better-known numbers when it was featured in the Beatles' 1967 television film Magical Mystery Tour. Performed in a stage routine by the Bonzos, it accompanied a striptease act, performed by Jan Carson of the Raymond Revuebar, who was enthusiastically ogled by club customers including John Lennon and George Harrison. Paul McCartney had coaxed Stanshall into wearing a pink chiffon scarf to look more "trendy".

The Bonzo Dog Band performed the song in a 1967 episode of the TV series Do Not Adjust Your Set, in which the band is gushingly introduced by Michael Palin (who gets the title wrong). The band appeared regularly on the show—a so-called children's programme which featured Palin, Eric Idle and other later-famous comedians.

== Title ==
The title also occurs in Richard Hoggart's 1957 book The Uses of Literacy, a pioneering work in the cultural studies field that discusses British popular culture. In Chapter 8, "The Newer Mass Art: Sex in Shiny Packets", under part C: "Sex and Violence Novels", Hoggart provides a list of "imitations" of the "terse, periodic titles" of these "American sex-novels", including "Sweetie, Take It Hot"; "The Lady Takes a Dive"; "Aim Low, Angel"; "Sweetheart, Curves Can Kill"; and "Death-Cab for Cutie". ("Curves can kill" also appears as a line in the song.)

Going further back, a 1949 detective pulp fiction novel by Hank Janson (the pen-name of English author Stephen Daniel Frances) was published in the UK with the title Slay-Ride for Cutie.

Ben Gibbard used the title of the song as the name of the rock band Death Cab for Cutie, which he founded in 1997. "I would absolutely go back and give it [the band] a more obvious name," he reflected in 2011; "Thank God for Wikipedia. At least now, people don’t have to ask me where the fucking name came from every interview." He later revised this stance, stating that he's "glad we have the name now, but in the early days it was tough" during a solo concert that was streamed online in March 2020.
