= I Am the Walrus =

1967 single by the Beatles

- US picture sleeve (reverse)

Single by the Beatles

from the EP and album Magical Mystery Tour
- A-side: "Hello, Goodbye"
- Released: 24 November 1967
- Recorded: 5, 6, 27 and 29 September 1967
- Studio: EMI, London
- Genre: Psychedelic pop; psychedelic rock
- Length: 4:33
- Label: Parlophone (UK); Capitol (US)
- Songwriter: Lennon–McCartney
- Producer: George Martin

The Beatles singles chronology
"All You Need Is Love" (1967)	"Hello, Goodbye" / "I Am the Walrus" (1967)	"Lady Madonna" (1968)

Audio sample
- file; help

"I Am the Walrus" is a song by the Beatles from their 1967 television film Magical Mystery Tour, and officially released on its soundtrack EP and album. Written by John Lennon and credited to Lennon–McCartney, it was released as the B-side to the single "Hello, Goodbye" and on the Magical Mystery Tour EP and album. In the film, the song underscores a segment in which the band mime to the recording at a deserted airfield.

Lennon wrote the song to confound listeners who had been affording serious scholarly interpretations of the Beatles' lyrics. He was partly inspired by two LSD trips and Lewis Carroll's 1871 poem "The Walrus and the Carpenter". Producer George Martin arranged and added orchestral accompaniment that included violins, cellos, horns, and clarinet. The Mike Sammes Singers, a 16-voice choir of professional studio vocalists, also joined the recording, variously singing nonsense lines and shrill whooping noises.

Since the "Hello, Goodbye" single and the Magical Mystery Tour EP both reached the top two slots on the British singles chart in December, "I Am the Walrus" holds the distinction of reaching numbers one and two simultaneously. Shortly after release, the song was banned by the BBC for the line "Boy, you've been a naughty girl, you let your knickers down".

== Composition ==
According to author Ian MacDonald, the "model" for "I Am the Walrus" was most likely Procol Harum's "A Whiter Shade of Pale", which was a hit single in mid-1967 and Lennon's favourite song of the period. The lyric came from three song ideas that Lennon had been working on, the first of which was inspired by hearing a police siren at his home in Weybridge; Lennon wrote the lines "Mis-ter cit-y p'lice-man" to the rhythm and melody of the siren. The second idea was a short rhyme about Lennon sitting amidst his garden, while the third was a nonsense phrase about sitting on a cornflake. Unable to finish the three different songs, he combined them into one. The lyric also included the phrase "Lucy in the sky", a reference to the Beatles' earlier song "Lucy in the Sky with Diamonds".

The walrus refers to Lewis Carroll's poem "The Walrus and the Carpenter" (from the book Through the Looking-Glass). Lennon later expressed dismay upon belatedly realising that the walrus was a villain in the poem.

The Animals frontman Eric Burdon claimed that he inspired the line "I am the eggman" after telling John Lennon about a sensual experience he had with his girlfriend involving a raw egg.

The final piece of the song came together during a visit from Pete Shotton, Lennon's friend and former fellow member of the Quarrymen, when Lennon asked him about a playground nursery rhyme they sang as children. Shotton recalled the rhyme as follows:

Yellow matter custard, green slop pie,
All mixed together with a dead dog's eye,
Slap it on a butty, ten-foot thick,
Then wash it all down with a cup of cold sick.

Lennon borrowed a couple of images from the first two lines. Shotton was also responsible for suggesting that Lennon change the phrase "waiting for the man to come" to "waiting for the van to come". The Beatles' official biographer, Hunter Davies, was present while the song was being written and wrote an account in his 1968 book The Beatles. According to this biography, Lennon remarked to Shotton, "Let the fuckers work that one out." While the band were studying Transcendental Meditation in India in early 1968, George Harrison told journalist Lewis Lapham that one of the lines in "I Am the Walrus" incorporated the personal mantra he had received from their meditation teacher, Maharishi Mahesh Yogi. According to Pattie Boyd, Harrison's wife at the time, the words "semolina pilchard" refer to Sergeant Pilcher of the London Drug Squad, who waged a campaign against British rock stars and underground figures during the late 1960s.

Lennon claimed he wrote the first two lines on separate acid trips; he explained much of the song to Playboy in 1980:

The first line was written on one acid trip one weekend. The second line was written on the next acid trip the next weekend, and it was filled in after I met Yoko ... I'd seen Allen Ginsberg and some other people who liked Dylan and Jesus going on about Hare Krishna. It was Ginsberg, in particular, I was referring to. The words 'Element'ry penguin' meant that it's naïve to just go around chanting Hare Krishna or putting all your faith in one idol. In those days I was writing obscurely, à la Dylan. [...] It never dawned on me that Lewis Carroll was commenting on the capitalist system. I never went into that bit about what he really meant, like people are doing with the Beatles' work. Later, I went back and looked at it and realized that the walrus was the bad guy in the story and the carpenter was the good guy. I thought, Oh, shit, I picked the wrong guy. I should have said, 'I am the carpenter.' But that wouldn't have been the same, would it? [Sings, laughing] 'I am the carpenter ...'

== Musical structure ==
The song is in the key of A. Verse 1 begins with a I–♭III–IV–I rock pattern: "I am he" (A chord)..."you are me" (C chord) "and we are all toge..." (D chord) "...ther" (A chord). Verse 2, however, involves a ♭VI–♭VII–I Aeolian ascent: "waiting" (F chord) "for the van" (G chord) "to come" (A chord). The chorus uses a ♭III–IV–V pattern: "I am the eggman (C chord), "they are the eggmen (D chord). "I am the walrus (E chord), "goo-goo-g'joob" hanging as an imperfect cadence until resolved with the I (A chord) on "Mr. City Policeman". At the line "Sitting in an English garden" the D♯ melody note (as in the instrumental introduction) establishes a Lydian mode (sharp 4th note in the scale), and this mode is emphasised more strongly with the addition of a D♯ note to the B chord on "If the sun don't come".

The song ends using a Shepard tone, with a chord progression built on ascending and descending lines in the bass and strings, repeated as the song fades. Musicologist Alan W. Pollack analyses: "The chord progression of the outro itself is a harmonic Moebius strip with scales in bassline and top voice that move in contrary motion." The bassline descends stepwise A, G, F, E, D, C, and B, while the strings part rises A, B, C, D, E, F♯, G: this sequence repeats as the song fades, with the strings rising higher on each iteration. Pollack also notes that the repeated cell is seven bars long, which means that a different chord begins each four-bar phrase. The fade is described by Walter Everett as a "false ending", in the form of an "unrelated coda" consisting of the orchestral chord progression, chorus, and sampling of the radio play.

== Recording ==
"I Am the Walrus" was the first studio recording made by the Beatles after the death of Brian Epstein, in August 1967. The basic backing track featuring the Beatles was released in 1996 on Anthology 2. George Martin arranged and added orchestral accompaniment that included violins, cellos, horns, and clarinet; the orchestral track was released in 2025 on Anthology 4. Paul McCartney said that Lennon gave instructions to Martin as to how he wished the orchestration to be scored, including singing most of the parts as a guide. The Mike Sammes Singers, a 16-voice choir of professional studio vocalists, also took part in the recording, variously singing "Ho-ho-ho, hee-hee-hee, ha-ha-ha", "oompah, oompah, stick it up your jumper!", "everybody's got one" and making a series of shrill whooping noises.

In 2015, founding Moody Blues member Ray Thomas said in an interview that he and fellow band member Mike Pinder contributed backing vocals to the song, as well as harmonicas to "The Fool on the Hill".

=== Incorporation of text from King Lear ===
The dramatic reading in the mix is Shakespeare's King Lear (Act IV, Scene 6), lines 219–222 and 249–262. It was added to the song on 29 September 1967, recorded directly from an AM radio Lennon was fiddling with. Lennon tuned around the dial and settled on the 7:30 pm to 11 pm broadcast of the play on the BBC Third Programme.

The first excerpt (ll. 219–222) moves in and out of the text, containing fragments of lines only. It begins where the disguised Edgar talks to his estranged and maliciously blinded father the Earl of Gloucester (timings given):

Gloucester: (2:26-2:27) Now, good sir, wh— (Lennon appears to change the channel away from the station here)
Edgar: (2:29-2:30) — poor man, made tame by fortune — (2:35) good pity —

In the play, Edgar then kills Oswald, Goneril's steward. During the fade of the song, the second main extract (ll. 249–262), this time of continuous text, is heard (timings given):

Oswald: (3:52) Slave, thou hast slain me. Villain, take my purse.
If ever thou wilt thrive, (4:02) bury my body,
And give the (4:05) letters which thou find'st about me
To (4:08) Edmund, Earl of Gloucester; (4:10) seek him out
Upon the British party. O, (4:14) untimely Death!
Edgar: (4:23) I know thee well: a (4:25) serviceable villain;
As duteous to the (4:27) vices of thy mistress
As badness would desire.
Gloucester: What, is he dead?
Edgar: (4:31) Sit you down, father, rest you.

On the radio broadcast, the roles were read by Mark Dignam (Gloucester), Philip Guard (Edgar), and John Bryning (Oswald).

== Mono vs. stereo versions ==
In the original (1967) stereo release, at around two minutes through the song, the mix changes from true stereo to "fake stereo". This came about because the radio broadcast had been added "live" into the mono mix-down and so was unavailable for inclusion in the stereo mix; hence, fake stereo from the mono mix was created for this portion of the song.

The mono version opens with a four-beat chord, while the stereo mix features six beats on the initial chord. The four-beat-only intro is also included on a different stereo mix (overseen by George Martin) for the previous MPI Home Video version of Magical Mystery Tour, especially the US Magical Mystery Tour album. The US mono single mix includes an extra bar of music before the words "yellow matter custard". This is actually the original uncut version of the mono mix called RM23. An early, overdub-free mix of the song released on Anthology 2 reveals John singing the lyrics "Yellow mat-" too early over this 'extra' bar of music which was later edited out. A hybrid version prepared for the 1980 US Rarities LP combines the six-beat opening with the extra bar of music that precedes the words "yellow matter custard" (from the aforementioned US mono single mix). An entirely new full stereo remix was done in 2012 for Apple's DVD and Blu-ray release of the restored version of Magical Mystery Tour.

A 5.1 surround sound full stereo remix of the song appeared on the DVD release of Anthology in 2003, on disc 4. A full stereo digital remix was also done for the Cirque du Soleil show Love and album of the same name, released in 2006. Producers George and Giles Martin were allowed access to early generations of the original master tapes. Musical parts that had previously been mixed were now available as separate elements. Additionally, a copy of the BBC broadcast of King Lear was acquired. Now, with all the sound sources used in the original mono mix present, a proper stereo remix could be accomplished. These tracks were transferred digitally and lined up to create a new multi-track master, from which a new mix would be made.

In addition to the stereo remixes prepared for the Love show and the 2012 Apple reissue referenced above, the DVDs that were released for those same projects contain a 5.1 surround sound mix of the song, making three distinct 5.1 remixes of the same song.

A new stereo mix was completed for 2023 reissue of the 1967–1970 compilation album.

== Personnel ==
According to Ian MacDonald, except where noted:

The Beatles

- John Lennon – double-tracked vocal, electric piano, Mellotron
- Paul McCartney – backing vocal, bass guitar, tambourine
- George Harrison – backing vocal, lead guitar
- Ringo Starr – drums

Additional musicians and production

- George Martin – production, orchestration and conducting
- Geoff Emerick – engineering
- Sidney Sax, Jack Rothstein, Ralph Elman, Andrew McGee, Jack Greene, Louis Stevens, John Jezzard and Jack Richards – violins
- Lionel Ross, Eldon Fox, Brian Martin and Terry Weil – cellos
- Gordon Lewin – contrabass clarinet
- Neill Sanders, Tony Tunstall and Morris Miller – horns
- Mike Sammes Singers (Peggie Allen, Wendy Horan, Pat Whitmore, Jill Utting, June Day, Sylvia King, Irene King, G. Mallen, Fred Lucas, Mike Redway, John O'Neill, F. Dachtler, Allan Grant, D. Griffiths, J. Smith and J. Fraser) – backing vocals
- Mark Dignam, Philip Guard and John Bryning – King Lear dialogue

== Reception ==
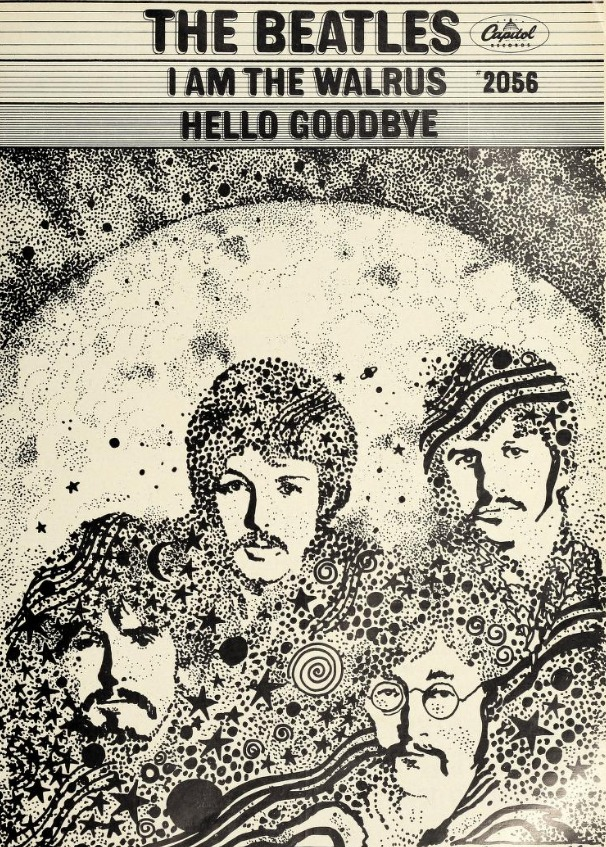
Advertisement for the "I Am the Walrus" single

Critical reception at the time of the track's release was largely positive. Writer Derek Johnson stated: "John growls the nonsense (and sometimes suggestive) lyric, backed by a complex scoring incorporating violins and cellos. You need to hear it a few times before you can absorb it." Nick Logan wrote: "Into the world of Alice in Wonderland now and you can almost visualise John crouching on a deserted shore singing 'I am the walrus' to some beautiful strings from far away on the horizon and a whole bagful of Beatle sounds, like a ringing doorbell and someone sawing a plank of wood. A fantastic track which you will need to live with for a while to fully appreciate." In a review for Melody Maker, Nick Jones considered the song "not such a complex sound as a lot of previous Beatles stuff but it builds nicely to a chattering, spinning cacophony of electricity and hissing gongs behind a barely audible "conversation"".

Richard Goldstein of The New York Times wrote that the song was "their most realized work since 'A Day In The Life'" and described it as "a fierce collage" with a "musical structure [that] mirrors this fragmentation". He said it "suggests a world much like that of 'A Day In The Life,' where the news is bad and John Lennon (now a Walrus, with a drooping moustache) would like to turn us on. Because he is an artist, he does."

In a highly unfavourable review of Magical Mystery Tour, Rex Reed of HiFi/Stereo Review said that "I Am the Walrus" "defies any kind of description known to civilized man. Not only is it ugly to hear, lacking any cohesion of style or technique, but it is utterly silly and pointless." He stated that the song "begins with an intro sounding suspiciously like one of John Barry's James Bond film scores", then quoted some of the lyrics before saying that "the whole thing fades out to what sounds like people being fried on electric fences and pigs rooting in a bucket of swill."

The song was banned by the BBC for the use of the word "knickers" in the line "Boy, you've been a naughty girl, you've let your knickers down".

Film composer and former Oingo Boingo frontman Danny Elfman stated in 2021 that the song, along with the Beatles' "A Day in the Life", "stayed with me my whole life, redefining for me what a song could do", and that Martin's "string arrangements really became part of my musical vocabulary."

=== Chart history ===
Chart (1967–68)	Peak position
Belgium (Ultratop 50 Wallonia)	1
New Zealand (Listener)	17
US Billboard Hot 100	56
US Cash Box Top 100	46

The single achieved sales of over 50,000 copies in Australia, being eligible for the award of a Gold Disc.

== Certifications ==
Region	Certification	Certified units/sales
United Kingdom (BPI)	Silver	200,000^{‡}
^{‡} Sales+streaming figures based on certification alone.

== Interpretation ==
After receiving a letter from a student at his former school, Quarry Bank High School for Boys, about how their literature classes were analysing the Beatles' songs, Lennon wrote "I Am the Walrus" to confuse those who tried to interpret it. There have nevertheless been many attempts to understand the meaning of the lyrics.

Lennon returned to the subject in the lyrics of three of his subsequent songs: in the 1968 Beatles song "Glass Onion" he sings, "I told you 'bout the walrus and me, man / You know that we're as close as can be, man / Well here's another clue for you all / The walrus was Paul".

Eric Burdon, lead singer of the Animals, claimed to be the "Eggman" mentioned in the song's lyric.
