= The Walrus and the Carpenter =

1871 poem by Lewis Carroll

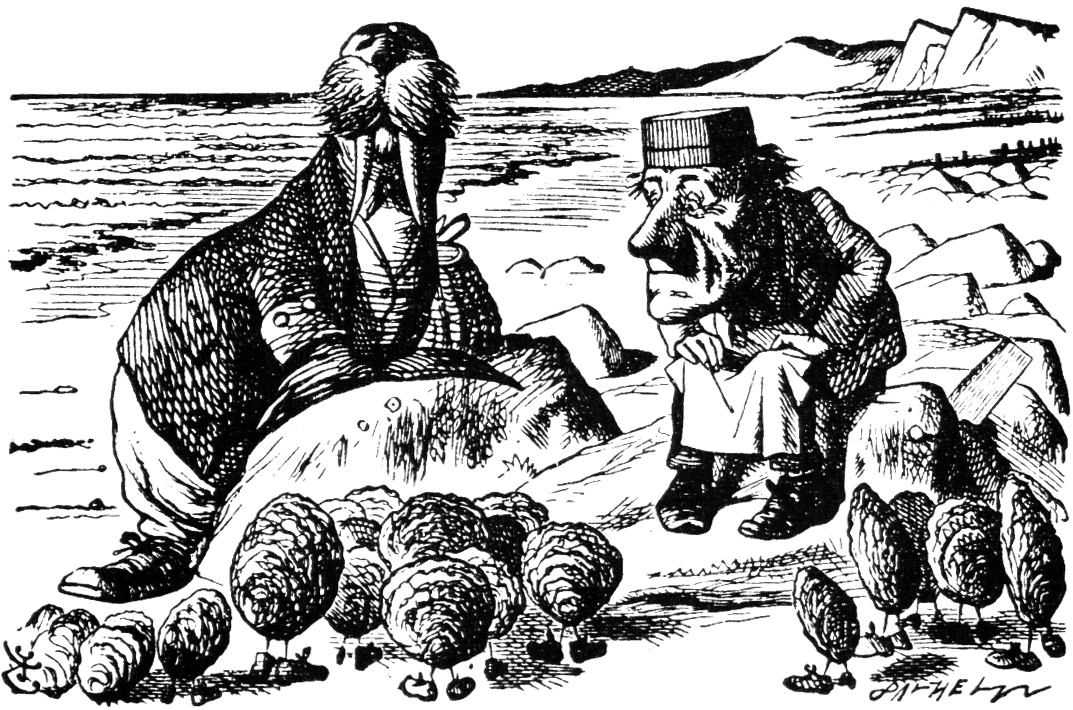
The Walrus and the Carpenter speaking to the Oysters, as portrayed by illustrator John Tenniel

"The Walrus and the Carpenter" is a narrative poem by Lewis Carroll that appears in his book Through the Looking-Glass, published in December 1871. The poem is recited in chapter four, by Tweedledum and Tweedledee to Alice.

== Summary ==
"The time has come," the Walrus said,
"To talk of many things:
Of shoes—and ships—and sealing-wax—
Of cabbages—and kings—
And why the sea is boiling hot—
And whether pigs have wings."

— Through the Looking-Glass

The poem tells the story of a walrus and a carpenter who meet on a beach and decide to go for a walk. They come across a group of oysters, and the walrus persuades them to come with them. The oysters follow the walrus and the carpenter, and they are eventually all eaten.

== Interpretations ==
The characters of the Walrus and the Carpenter have been interpreted many ways both in literary criticism and popular culture. British essayist J. B. Priestley argued that the figures were political. Walter Russell Mead supposed they represent aspects of Protestant and Transcendentalist societies during Carroll's life. They were also inspired by two sea stacks that stood outside the holiday home Carroll stayed at in Llandudno, Wales.

The 1967 Beatles song "I Am the Walrus", which is based on the poem, is also a common subject of nonsense inquiry. John Lennon later inferred Carroll's views on capitalism from the poem, joking that perhaps he should have instead sung "I Am the Carpenter".

In the 1999 film Dogma, Loki, the former Angel of Death (played by Matt Damon), presents the poem as an indictment of organized religion in order to test the faith of a Catholic nun.

== Film and television ==
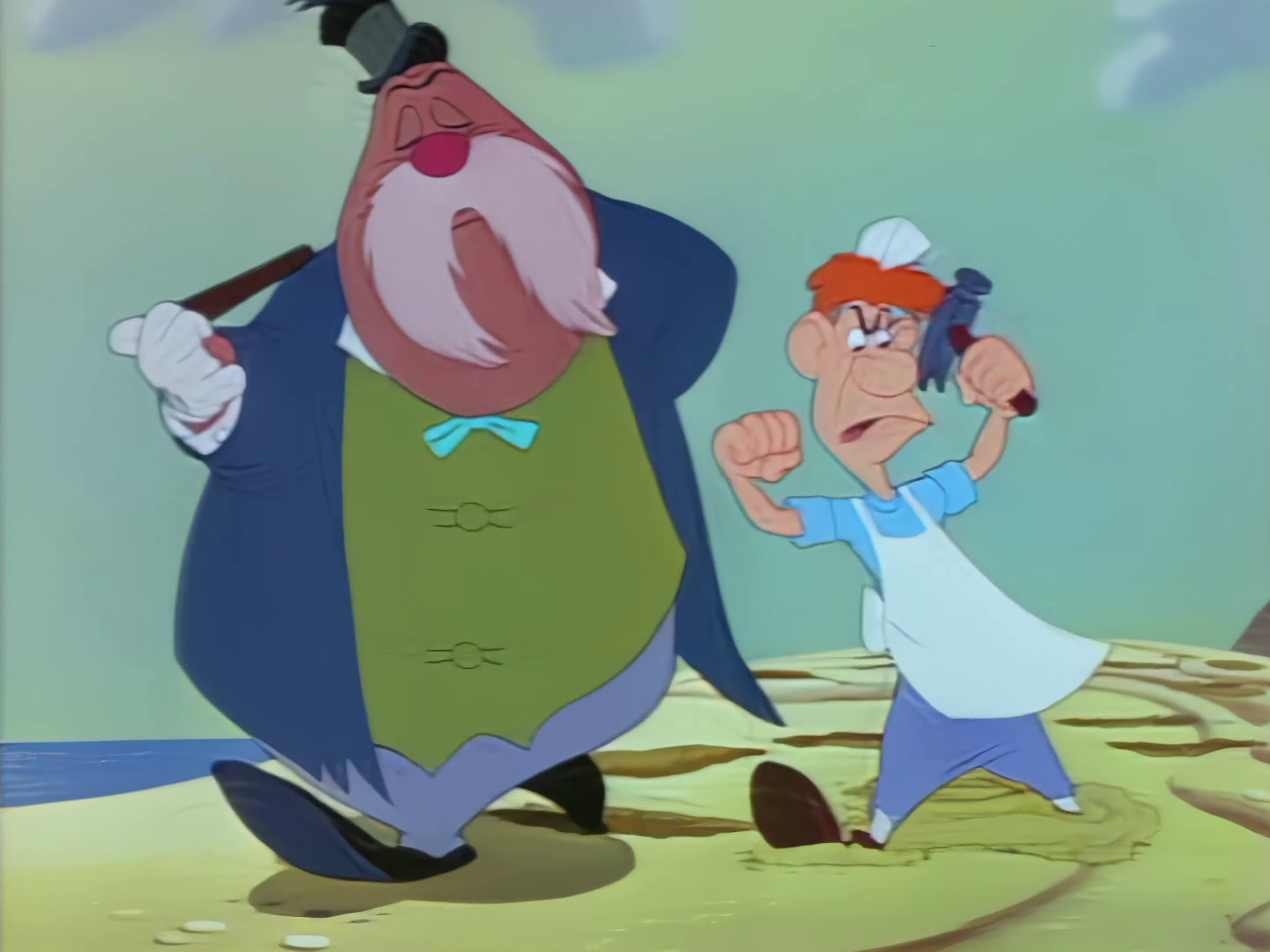
The Walrus and Carpenter as seen in their segment in Alice in Wonderland (1951)

- The "Walrus and the Carpenter" story appears in Disney's 1951 animated film Alice in Wonderland, told by Tweedledee and Tweedledum. J. Pat O'Malley voices both characters.
- In the 1996 film Harriet the Spy, the poem is quoted several times by Catherine (Rosie O'Donnell) and Harriet (Michelle Trachtenberg).
- In the 1999 version of Alice in Wonderland, the story appears near the end of the film, when Alice meets the twins, performed in a puppet theater with the Walrus (Peter Ustinov) and the Carpenter (Pete Postlethwaite) appearing on a small stage.
- The Walrus and the Carpenter are recurring characters in the 1983 anime Fushigi no Kuni no Alice.
- The 2009 miniseries Alice depicts Carpenter, alias Robert Hamilton (Timothy Webber), as Alice's father. Walrus (Dave Ward) is shown as a human who is Carpenter's prison mate. In the case of both, "Carpenter" and "Walrus" being only nicknames for them.

== See also ==
- I Am the Walrus
