= Flying (Beatles instrumental) =

1967 instrumental by the Beatles

- Cover of the song's sheet music

Instrumental by the Beatles

from the EP and album Magical Mystery Tour
- Released: 27 November 1967 (US) (LP); 8 December 1967 (UK) (EP)
- Recorded: 8 & 28 September 1967
- Studio: EMI, London
- Genre: Instrumental rock; psychedelia
- Length: 2:17
- Label: Parlophone (UK), Capitol (US)
- Songwriters: George Harrison; John Lennon; Paul McCartney; Richard Starkey
- Producer: George Martin

"Flying" is an instrumental recorded by the English rock band the Beatles which first appeared on the 1967 Magical Mystery Tour release (two EP discs in the United Kingdom, an LP in the United States). It is one of the few songs credited to all four members of the band: John Lennon, Paul McCartney, George Harrison and Ringo Starr.

== Origins ==
The first instrumental written by the Beatles since "12-Bar Original" in 1965, "Flying" was also the first song to be credited as being written by all four members of the band with the writing credits of "Harrison/Lennon–McCartney/Starkey". Like "12-Bar Original", it was based on the classic twelve-bar blues chord progression. The other two Beatles instrumentals are "Cayenne" and "Cry for a Shadow", recorded in 1960 and 1961 respectively.

"Flying" was recorded on 8 September 1967 with Mellotron, guitar, bass, maracas and drums, with tape loop overdubs added on 28 September, under its original title of "Aerial Tour Instrumental". The end of the recording originally included a fast-paced traditional New Orleans jazz-influenced coda, but this was removed and replaced with an ending featuring tape loops created by John Lennon and Ringo Starr during the 28 September session. The loops extended the song to 9 minutes 38 seconds, but the track was cut down to only 2 minutes 17 seconds. Part of the loops were used alongside an element of the ending jazz sequence to make "The Bus", an incidental piece used at various points in the TV movie.

== Recording ==
On the track, as recorded and officially released, Lennon plays the main theme on Mellotron, accompanied by McCartney on bass, Harrison on guitars, and Starr on maracas and drums. All four Beatles sing the melody without lyrics of any kind, and the track fades in an assortment of tape effects created by Lennon and Starr. This released version is identical to that heard on the soundtrack of the Magical Mystery Tour film; the music is accompanied in the film by colour-altered images of landscape in Iceland taken from an aeroplane, as well as some unused footage from the 1964 Stanley Kubrick film Dr. Strangelove.

A different version can be found on some Beatles bootleg albums (such as Back-track 1), and features added Hammond organ and strange whistling noises in the early parts of the track. The jazz-influenced ending is also present on this version, which is slightly shorter, clocking in at around 2:08. This coda, which Mark Lewisohn speculated was "seemingly copied straight from an unidentifiable modern jazz record", was in fact played on a Mellotron. (In addition to the familiar samples of instruments playing single notes, Mellotrons had entire banks of a pop orchestra playing popular styles of music, with optional accompaniment. The piece here was played with the Dixieland Rhythm Mellotron setting.)

== Reception ==
Richard Goldstein of The New York Times believed that the track, "as instrumental interlude, is more interesting, if only because it is more modest [than the rest of the album]". Robert Christgau said that the track was "just a cut above Paul Mauriat, not bad but not Our Boys". Rex Reed, in a highly unfavourable review of the album for Stereo Review, said that it "sounds like the soundtrack of an old Maria Montez jungle movie at just about the point where she feeds the chanting populace to the cobras".

== Personnel ==
- John Lennon – wordless vocals, Mellotron, Hammond organ, sound effects
- Paul McCartney – wordless vocals, bass
- George Harrison – wordless vocals, guitars
- Ringo Starr – wordless vocals, drums, maracas, sound effects
- unknown - piano
