= Sidney Sax =

British violinist (1913–2005)

Sidney Sax (1913–2005) was a British violinist. He was a noted orchestral leader and also a contractor, arranging personnel for many recording sessions. In 1964, he jointly founded the National Philharmonic Orchestra, London, together with Charles Gerhardt.

The National Philharmonic Orchestra, which was later incorporated in 1970, was a freelance orchestra that included amongst its players leading musicians from all the London orchestras. Sax had often contracted the leaders of most of London's orchestras to populate his first violin section.

== Recording career ==
Sax brought together the National Philharmonic Orchestra to make several notable recordings with Leopold Stokowski in the 1970s. Their first recording together (for a 'Desmar' LP in April/May 1975) was of Rachmaninov's Symphony No. 3, which had been premiered by Stokowski in 1936. EMI 7243-5-66759-2-6. There were two albums for PYE Records recorded at West Ham Central Mission, in 1976. Record PCNH4 included Saint-Saëns Danse Macabre, with Sidney Sax as solo violinist. There were also CBS recordings made with Leopold Stokowski again at the West Ham Central Mission that included Sibelius's 1st Symphony and the Bizet Carmen and L'Arlesienne Suites, and at EMI's Abbey Road Studios, where Stokowski made his very last recordings in 1977, of Mendelssohn's Italian Symphony and Bizet's Symphony in C.

Bernard Herrmann was another conductor who recorded with Sax and the National Philharmonic, mainly in film music by himself and other composers, for the Decca / London "Phase 4" label. Herrmann also recorded his own Symphony with the National Philharmonic for the Unicorn label.

Sax was the leader of the Ariel Quartet, a string quartet that also featured Maurice Taylor (violin), Kenneth Essex (viola), and Francesco Gabarro nicknamed "Gabby" (cello). Sax was also a member of The Mantovani Orchestra, leading one of the first post-war tours of the USA with Mantovani and was also part of the Fred Hartley Quintet. For Decca/London 'Phase 4' he recorded a selection of solo-violin-and-orchestra arrangements made by himself (short pieces by Tchaikovsky, Massenet, Korngold, etc.) under the pseudonym Josef Sakonov in which he also conducted the London Festival Orchestra with his violin bow (London 444 786-2).

Sax also took part in many notable recordings for a number of famous artists, including Victor Silvester (including "Slow Slow Quick Quick Slow"), Marianne Faithfull ("Is This What I Get for Loving You?"). In addition, he played on a number of recordings for the Beatles, "Yesterday", "Eleanor Rigby", and "All You Need is Love" among them.

A further large part of his career involved playing on the soundtracks of many films, of a variety of genres, including The Pink Panther Strikes Again, The Boys from Brazil, Paper Tiger, Valentino, and Jesus of Nazareth.

== Further work ==
Sax also contributed to broadcasts for the BBC, for the Light Programme, with his ensemble 'Sidney Sax and the Harlequins' an eight-piece string ensemble. Sax also directed a larger broadcasting combination called the Sidney Sax strings.

Sax was featured on recordings of film scores by Roy Budd, e.g. The Internecine Project.
