= The Innes Book of Records (TV series) =

British TV series (1979–1981)

- Created by: Neil Innes
- Written by: Neil Innes
- Country of origin: United Kingdom
- No. of series: 3
- No. of episodes: 18

Production
- Running time: approx. 25 minutes

Original release
- Network: BBC2
- Release: 17 January 1979 – 9 November 1981

The Innes Book of Records is a television show made by the English singer-songwriter Neil Innes. Three series of the show aired between January 1979 and November 1981.

== Synopsis ==
There were six episodes in each of three series. Each episode in the series is an anthology of short music videos featuring Innes and other performers. These included Jake Thackray, Ivor Cutler, Michael Palin, Kenny Everett, Stanley Unwin, John Cooper Clarke, and Vivian Stanshall, among others.

The opening credits for the first series, featuring a man in a spacesuit in a deserted house, included references to his 1968 hit song with the Bonzo Dog Doo-Dah Band, "I'm the Urban Spaceman", which was performed for the third series.

== Production ==
Innes was asked to make the series, which was his first solo series, after Rutland Weekend Television had ended. He had wanted to use the title Parodies Lost, but his producer, Ian Keill, insisted on its title.

Composer John Altman was musical director for all three series. The song parodies were filmed on location in the second series.

== Broadcast ==
It was first broadcast on 17 January 1979 on BBC2. It was renewed for two further series, with the final episode on 9 November 1981.

The show was aired on UK Gold TV in the late 1990s. A bonus DVD with 16 clips from the show was included in three Recollections: Le Duck's Box Set, released in 2013.

== Music ==
Innes' own composition, the 1967 novelty song "Death Cab For Cutie", first used in The Beatles' film Magical Mystery Tour, was used in the series.

He released two audio albums, The Innes Book of Records (Polydor, 1979) and Off the Record (1982), of songs from the show.
