= Billy Bremner (musician) =

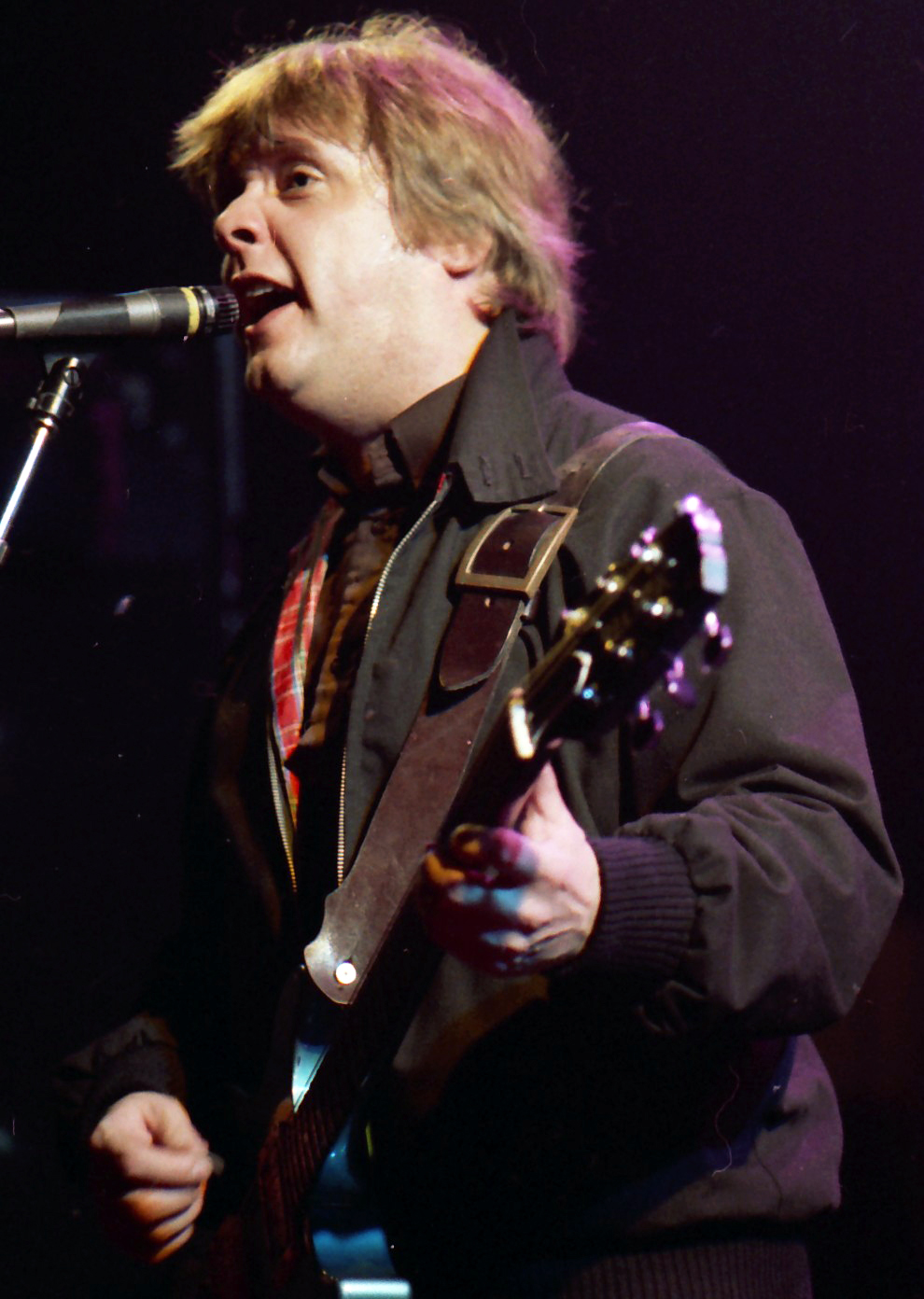
- Bremner performing with Rockpile at the Danforth Music Hall in Toronto, Ontario, in 1980

Background information
- Born: William Murray Bremner; 4 August 1946 (age 79); Aberdeen, Aberdeenshire, Scotland
- Genres: Rock, rock and roll, rockabilly, country music
- Occupations: Musician, songwriter
- Instruments: Guitar, vocals
- Years active: 1964–present
- Labels: Ariola, Arista, State, Stiff, Polydor, WEA

William Murray Bremner (born 4 August 1946, in Aberdeen, Aberdeenshire, Scotland) is a Scottish guitarist and singer, best known for his work in the band Rockpile and on many of Nick Lowe and Dave Edmunds' albums. He has also played with The Pretenders, Shakin' Stevens, Carlene Carter and The Coal Porters, as well as issuing four solo albums.

== Career overview ==
Bremner first became known playing with The Luvvers, who served as Lulu's backing band. However, by the time Bremner joined the group in 1966, they were on the wane; Bremner did not play on any of Lulu's recorded material, and joined just after the group recorded their only single without Lulu ("The House on the Hill"/"Most Unlovely") for Parlophone in 1966. The Luvvers disbanded in 1967.

In 1971, Bremner added some guitar work to March Hare, the first solo album from ex-Honeybus member Colin Hare. He then became a member of the Neil Innes band Fatso, which went on to record the soundtrack for the original Rutland Weekend Television series.

As "Bill Murray" he released two singles produced by Kris Ife: "Downtown Hoedown" / "Rhyme And Reason" (Polydor 2058 881, 1977) and "Heart and the Stone" / "I Don't Wanna Be No Hero" (State Records STAT 72, 1978).

Next, he joined Rockpile, who only released one album under their own name, but also served as the band for most of Nick Lowe's and Dave Edmunds' albums in the 1970s. In addition to his guitar playing, Bremner occasionally sang lead, as he did on "Heart" and "You Ain't Nothing But Fine" on the 1980 Rockpile album Seconds of Pleasure. He also wrote Edmunds' hit "Trouble Boys" (which Edmunds would let him sing live), but used an alias, Billy Murray, on the writing credits, so as not to be confused with the more famous Scottish footballer, of the same name. "Trouble Boys" was covered by Thin Lizzy on a single in 1981. Another song by him, "The Creature from the Black Lagoon", appeared on Edmunds' third solo album, Repeat When Necessary.

After Rockpile split in 1981, Bremner released two solo singles on Stiff Records "Loud Music In Cars" / "The Price is Right" (BUY 125) and "Laughter Turns to Tears" / "Tired and Emotional" (BUY 143). Bremner then played lead guitar on The Pretenders' 1982 hit single "Back On The Chain Gang" / "My City Was Gone" and later provided lead guitar for their 1990 album Packed!.

Bremner released his first solo album, Bash!, in 1984, containing songs co-written with The Records' Will Birch, and covers of songs by Elvis Costello, and Chris Difford and Glenn Tilbrook of Squeeze. Bash! featured a rhythm section of Dave Kerr-Clemenson from Fast Buck on bass and Terry Williams from Rockpile on drums. Bremner played all the guitar parts and sang the harmonies with Kerr-Clemenson.

After stints in Los Angeles, California, (where he played in the bands of Pat McLaughlin and Rosie Flores) and Nashville, Tennessee Bremner moved to Sweden in the 1990s where he met The Refreshments, producing and playing on their album It's Gotta Be Both Rock 'n' Roll. A second solo album, A Good Week's Work, followed in 1999 and a third No Ifs, Buts, Maybes in 2006, both recorded in Sweden. His most recent solo album, Rock Files, was issued in 2012.

Bremner was also a member of Stockholm-based band Trouble Boys with Sean Tyla and two Swedish musicians, who released an album called Bad Trouble in September 2012

== Album discography ==
=== Solo ===
- Bash! (1984)
- A Good Week's Work (1998)
- No Ifs, Buts, Maybes (2006)
- Rockfiles (2012)
- Singled Out (2018)
- Cocktail of the Year (2020)
- Live in Tokyo With Johnny Spampinato, The Value Leaders (2024)

=== As a member of Rockpile ===
- Seconds of Pleasure 1980
- Live at Montreux 1980 2011

=== As a sideman ===
With Dave Edmunds

- Tracks on Wax 4 1978
- Repeat When Necessary 1979
- Twangin...' 1981
- Pile of Rock: Live 2001

With Nick Lowe

- Jesus of Cool (UK) / Pure Pop for Now People (US) 1978
- Labour of Lust 1979
- Nick the Knife 1982
- Nick Lowe & His Cowboy Outfit 1984

With The Pretenders

- Learning to Crawl 1984
- Packed! 1990
- Pirate Radio 2006

With Shakin' Stevens

- Give Me Your Heart Tonight 1982
- Hits and More 2003
- Collectable 2004
- Collection 2005

With Carlene Carter

- Musical Shapes 1980
- Blue Nun 1981

With The Coal Porters

- Land of Hope and Crosby 1994
- London 1995
- Rebels Without Applause 1996

With Neil Innes

- Taking Off 1977
- The Rutland Weekend Songbook 1976

With Jim Lauderdale

- Persimmons 1996
- Other Sessions 2000

With Trouble Boys

- Bad Trouble (2012) Ball and Chain Records

With other artists

- Anne Feeney – Look to the Left 1989
- Anne Sofie von Otter & Elvis Costello – For the Stars 2001
- Any Trouble – Wrong End of the Race 1984
- Bob Young – In Quo Country 1980
- Deke Leonard – Before Your Very Eyes 1981
- Don Morrell – After All These Years 1999
- Elvis Costello & the Attractions – Trust 1981
- Foreigner – Mr. Moonlight 1995
- George Ducas – George Ducas 1995
- Howard Werth – Six of One and a Half Dozen of the Other 1996
- John Gorman – Go Man Gorman 1977
- Kelly Willis – Kelly Willis 1993
- Kieran Kane – Find My Way Home 1993
- Mickey Jupp – Juppanese 1978
- Nirvana – To Markos III 1969
- Pat McLaughlin – Pat McLaughlin 1988
- Paul Kennerley – Misery with a Beat 1998
- Phil Everly – Phil Everly 1983
- Rosie Flores – Honky Tonk Reprise 1996
- Snake Farm – What Kind of Dreams Are These 1989
- The Refreshments – It's Gotta Be Both Rock 'n' Roll 2006
- Totta Näslund – Totta, Vol. 3: En Dare Som Jag 2008
- Roadwork – Round Two 2013
