= The Rutland Weekend Songbook =

Studio album by Eric Idle & Neil Innes
- Released: 1976
- Genre: Comedy Music
- Length: 41:24
- Label: BBC Records
- Producer: Neil Innes

Eric Idle & Neil Innes chronology
How Sweet to Be an Idiot (1973)	The Rutland Weekend Songbook (1976)	Taking Off (1977)

Professional ratings
Review scores
Source	Rating
Allmusic	4/5 stars

The Rutland Weekend Songbook, sometimes referred to as Rutland Times, is a 1976 album by Eric Idle and Neil Innes featuring songs from the BBC comedy series Rutland Weekend Television.

It was described by AllMusic's reviewer as "a 21-track masterpiece that really is as funny as it ought to be. An effortless parody of the last decade or so of British television's most treasured conceits".

== Track listing ==
=== Side one ===
1. "L'Amour Perdu" - 0:38
2. "Gibberish" - 1:38
3. "Front Loader" - 2:39
4. "Say Sorry Again" - 2:19
5. "I Must Be in Love" - 2:36
6. "Twenty-Four Hours in Tunbridge Wells" - 1:48
7. "The Fabulous Bingo Brothers" - 1:09
8. "Concrete Jungle Boy" - 3:21
9. "The Children of Rock and Roll" - 0:44
10. "Stoop Solo" - 2:36
11. "The Song O' the Insurance Men" - 0:55

=== Side two ===
1. "Testing" - 0:37
2. "I Give Myself to You" - 2:19
3. "Communist Cooking" - 1:24
4. "Johnny Cash" - 0:57
5. "Protest Song" - 3:42
6. "Accountancy Shanty" - 0:45
7. "Football" - 1:33
8. "Boring" - 2:39
9. "L'Amour Perdu Cha Cha Cha" - 1:54
10. "The Hard to Get" - 3:03
11. "The Song O' the Continuity Announcers" - 2:14

Early version of The Rutles' "I Must Be in Love"
Early version of The Rutles' "Good Times Roll"

(BBC REB233). (CD issue MSI MSI 10079 Japan only)

== Personnel ==
- Eric Idle - vocals
- Neil Innes (credited as "Nobby") - piano
- Roger Rettig - guitar
- Billy Bremner - guitar
- Brian Hodgson - bass
- John Halsey - drums
- Andy Roberts - guitar
- Dave Richards - bass
- Roger Swallow - drums
- Zoot Money - vocal
