= The Refreshments =

The Refreshments may refer to:

- The Refreshments (American band), a band from Arizona, United States
- The Refreshments (Swedish band), a band from Sweden
