= David Battley =

British actor (1935–2003)

- Born: David John Battley; 5 November 1935; Battersea, London, England
- Died: 20 January 2003 (aged 67); Epsom, Surrey, England
- Occupation: Actor
- Years active: 1964–2000
- Notable work: Willy Wonka and the Chocolate Factory; Rutland Weekend Television
- Spouse: Sarah Hanrahan (m. 1971)
- Children: 2

David John Battley (5 November 1935 – 20 January 2003) was an English actor of stage and screen, mainly appearing in comedy roles.

== Early life ==
Battley was born at Battersea, London, the elder son of John Battley, a post-Second World War Labour MP, and his wife Sybill (née Allchurch). Born with a hole in the heart, he was initially home schooled before attending a special school. He later enrolled at Camberwell School of Art but left before completing the course. He earned a living working for the family printing firm, Battley Brothers, before applying to Royal Academy of Dramatic Art. Battley had one brother, Bernard.

== Career ==
Battley used a dry, ironic delivery on television and in films. He found steady work as a character actor and comic stooge. Battley's TV work ranged from the satire show BBC-3 and the military police drama Redcap in the 1960s through Eric Sykes' BBC sitcom, the 1975 TV adaptation of Moll Flanders, the 1977 Christmas Special of The Good Life, and later The Bill, Lovejoy, The Beiderbecke Tapes as John the hippy barman, and Mr. Bean. Battley also appears as the Executioner in the 1966 BBC production of Alice in Wonderland. He also appeared in the mid-1970s as a foil to Eric Idle in the BBC series Rutland Weekend Television (1975–1976). Battley played the Paul McCartney role in the original RWT sketch of The Rutles, a parody of The Beatles, but did not appear in the American TV film All You Need Is Cash, based on the sketch.

Battley also featured in films, including Hotel Paradiso (1966), Crossplot (1969), Willy Wonka & the Chocolate Factory (1971), Up the Chastity Belt (1972), Up the Front (1972), That's Your Funeral (1972), Rentadick (1972), Don't Just Lie There, Say Something! (1973), Mister Quilp (1975), S.O.S. Titanic (1979), The London Connection (1979) and Krull (1983).

In 1990, he appeared in an early episode of One Foot in the Grave. Among his last roles were a miniature golf course employee in the Mr. Bean episode "Tee Off, Mr. Bean" (1995), and a doctor examining new regimental recruits in Sharpe's Regiment (1996).

== Personal life ==
Battley had two daughters, Zoe S. Battley and E. Martha Battley.

== Death ==
He died on 20 January 2003, after suffering a heart attack, at the age of 67, in Epsom, Surrey, England.

== Filmography ==
=== Film ===
Year	Title	Role	Notes
1966	Hotel Paradiso	George	
1966	Alice in Wonderland	Executioner	TV film
1968	The Franchise Trail	Wesley Dagenham	TV film
1969	Mrs Wilson's Diary	David Frost	TV film
1969	Crossplot	Bridegroom	
1971	Willy Wonka & the Chocolate Factory	Mr. Turkentine	
1972	Up the Chastity Belt	Yokel	
1972	Rentadick	Desk Sergeant	
1972	Up the Front	Midgeley the Cook	
1972	Follow Me!	Writer	Uncredited
1972	That's Your Funeral	Percy	
1974	Don't Just Lie There, Say Something!	Country Yokel	
1975	A Man in the Zoo	Collins	TV film
1975	Mister Quilp	Codlin	
1975	Moll Flanders	Henry Haydock	TV film
1976	The Snow Queen	Old Woman	TV film
1979	The Omega Connection	Peters	
1979	S.O.S. Titanic	Chief Boots: S. Stebbing	TV film
1980	Moving Pictures	Picture Restorer	TV film
1983	Krull	Ergo	
1998	Vigo: A Passion for Life	Cinema Manager	
2000	Out of Depth	Donald	

=== Television ===
Year	Title	Role	Notes
1964	Second City Reports	Various roles	Series regular
1964	The Protectors	Wally	Episode: "The Reluctant Thief"
1964	The Indian Tales of Rudyard Kipling	Private Jones	Episode: "Only a Subaltern"
1964-1965	Redcap	Corporal Metters	2 episodes
1965	Public Eye	Charlie Andrews	Episode: "You Think It'll Be Marvellous - But It's Always a Rabbit"
1966	Sergeant Cork	James Starkey	Episode: "The Case of the Crystal Ball"
1966	Mystery and Imagination	Klaus	Episode: "Room 13"
1967	The Wednesday Play	Joey	Episode: "Another Day, Another Dollar"
1967	Mickey Dunne	Milkman	Episode: "No Flowers by Request"
1967	Theatre 625	The New Scribe	Episode: "Lieutenant Tenant"
1968	The Jazz Age	Hook	Episode: "Thark"
1969	Hark at Barker		Episode: "Rustless in Pigtails"
1969	The Benny Hill Show	Russian Officer	Episode: "Show 1"
1970	Comedy Playhouse	Percy	Episode: "Last Tribute"
1970-1971	That's Your Funeral	Percy	Series regular
1971	The Sinners	Olly	Episode: "One Man, One Boat, One Girl"
1971	Father, Dear Father	Sorting Office Clerk	Episode: "A Book for the Bishop"
1972	Sykes	Darlington Porter	3 episodes
1973	The Rivals of Sherlock Holmes	Podgers	Episode: "The Absent-Minded Coterie"
1973	Bless This House	Mr. Jones	Episode: "Watch the Birdie"
1973	Centre Play	Dennis	Episode: "The Museum Attendant"
1973	Sporting Scenes	Villager	Episode: "England, Their England"
1973	BBC Play of the Month	Costar Pearmain	Episode: "The Recruiting Officer"
1974	Jackanory Playhouse	Percy Harlow	Episode: "The Lost Voice"
1974	Funny Ha-Ha	Boy Wonder	Episode: "Commander Badman"
1974	Bless This House	Wally	Episode: "Freedom Is"
1975	Churchill's People	Edwards	Episode: "Death of Liberty"
1975	Comedy Playhouse	Nigel the Idle	Episode: "For Richer... For Poorer"
1975-1976	Rutland Weekend Television	Stig O'Hara - Rutles Bassist	Series regular
1976	Saturday Night Live	Stig O'Hara	Episode: "Eric Idle/Joe Cocker/Stuff"
1977	BBC Play of the Month	Parson	Episode: "The Country Wife"
1977	Beryl's Lot	Mr. Biggleswade	2 episodes
1977	The Cost of Loving	Desmond Waterhouse	Episode: "Albert's Part"
1977	The Good Life	Bill, Tradesman	Episode: "Silly, But It's Fun"
1978	In the Looking Glass		Episode: "Fading Away"
1979	The Dawson Watch		2 episodes
1981	Crown Court	Paul Flood	3 episodes
1981	Thicker than Water	Harry Fishwick	
1981	Roger Doesn't Live Here Anymore	Porter	1 episode
1982	Don't Rock the Boat	Eric	2 episodes
1983	The Climber	Ted	
1984	The Gentle Touch	Reginald Loon	2 episodes
1985	Super Gran	Police Sergeant	Episode: "Supergran and the Day at the Sea"
1985-1987	Relative Strangers	Gerald	Series regular
1986	Comrade Dad	Cliff	Episode: "Cars That Pass in the Night"
1986	Dramarama	Arthur Crouchley	Episode: "Last Days of Black Berts"
1987	The Beiderbecke Tapes	John the Barman	Miniseries
1989	Close to Home	Mr. Barnes	Episode: "A Matter of Decree"
1990	One Foot in the Grave	Carpet-Fitter	Episode: "The Eternal Quadrangle"
1992	The Darling Buds of May	Norman	Episode: "Oh! To Be in England"
1994	The Bill	Banwell	Episode: "No Job for an Amateur"
1994	Minder	Potter	Episode: "Bring Me the Head of Arthur Daley"
1994	Lovejoy	Norman Ebersley	Episode: "Holding the Baby"
1995	As Time Goes By	Ted Pringle	Episode: "The Anniversary Party"
1995	Mr. Bean	Golf Attendant	Episode: "Tee Off, Mr. Bean"
1996	Annie's Bar	Gus James	3 episodes
1996	Sharpe	Doctor	Episode: "Sharpe's Regiment"
1997	Grange Hill	Cab Driver	1 episode
1999	Murder Most Horrid	Mr. Gaunt	Episode: "Frozen"
