= The Raggy Dolls =

British animated television series (1986–1994)

- Title card
- Genre: Fantasy; Children and family series Comedy drama Adventure
- Created by: Melvyn Jacobson
- Developed by: John Walker
- Written by: Neil Innes
- Voices of: Neil Innes
- Narrated by: Neil Innes
- Theme music composer: Neil Innes
- Opening theme: Raggy Dolls, Dolls like you and me
- Country of origin: United Kingdom
- Original language: English
- No. of series: 10
- No. of episodes: 112

Production
- Executive producer: John Marsden
- Producer: Jo Kemp / Neil Molyneux / Joy Whitby
- Running time: 11 minutes
- Production companies: Yorkshire Television (1986–1994); Orchid Productions (1987–1994)

Original release
- Network: ITV (CITV) Nick Jr.
- Release: 3 April 1986 – 20 December 1994

The Raggy Dolls is a British cartoon series which originally aired on ITV that aired from 1986 to 1994. The series is set in Mr Grimes' Toy Factory, where imperfect dolls are thrown into a reject bin. While unobserved by human eyes, the dolls come to life and climb out of the reject bin to have adventures. The series was designed to encourage children to think positively about physical disabilities. 112 episodes were produced.

== Production history ==
The series was produced for Yorkshire Television and ran from 3 April 1986 to 20 December 1994. It was created by Melvyn Jacobson, with scripts, narration, and music by Neil Innes. Yorkshire Television produced the first two series of The Raggy Dolls before production shifted to Orchid Productions Limited in 1987.

This was the first programme Yorkshire Television commissioned from an independent production company. Orchid Productions went on to produce over 100 more episodes of the series. The initial animator for Yorkshire Television was Roy Evans. After the move to Orchid Productions, Mark Mason took over the role, animating and storyboarding 26 episodes, and storyboarding and directing other animators on a further 26 episodes before moving on to work on other children's TV series. He was replaced by Peter Hale from the 7th series onwards. The series was sold to a number of broadcasters in several countries around the world.

== Characters ==
=== The Raggy Dolls ===
- Sad Sack – A sample of a design that was deemed too expensive to mass-produce; his appearance is somewhat different from that of the others. He is the oldest of the seven Raggy Dolls in the Reject Bin. As his name suggests, he is very gloomy and cynical, but he still values his friendship with the other dolls.
- Dotty – As the oldest next to the lethargic Sad Sack, she sees herself as the leader of the group and is often very bossy. She is so named because blue paint was accidentally spilt on her hair and clothing. Dotty's main catchphrase is: "Good thinking!"
- Hi-Fi – He converses with stammer due to him being dropped during testing. It was also stated in the episode "The Trouble with Claude" that he was wired incorrectly, hence the stammer. He always wears headphones, which allow him to tune into radio and communication signals from seemingly any source.
- Lucy – Her limbs are inadequately attached with nylon thread. She is shy and easily frightened, but is always kind-hearted and loyal to her friends. She can be brave on occasion, as first seen in the episode "Ghosts". She speaks with a Derbyshire accent.
- Back-To-Front – A handyman doll with a backward-facing head (as a result of the manufacturer putting his head on the wrong way round) and a love of machines. Always calm in a crisis, his catchphrase is "No problem!".
- Claude – A French doll, who, unlike his companions, is actually perfect in every way. He fell out of a box of dolls being shipped to France and was left behind, being put in the bin out of a lack of other places. He speaks with a French accent and sometimes alternates between speaking English and French. He also has a notable talent for cooking.
- Princess – She should have been a beautiful princess doll, but the machine accidentally cut her hair and left her dress in rags. In the manner of a typical aristocrat, her voice is characterised by H-adding. As the opening titles indicate, Princess is the youngest of the original seven Raggy Dolls.
- Ragamuffin – A wandering traveller doll who had lost his owner and decided to spend his life taking in new sights and experiences. Introduced in the fifth series.

=== Friends ===
- Pumpernickle – A scarecrow who is a friend of the Raggy Dolls.
- Edward – Mr. Grimes's long-lost teddy bear who becomes a good friend to the Raggy Dolls.
- Mr. Marmalade – Mr. Grimes's pet ginger cat who is very playful and frisky.
- Hercules – An old farm horse.
- Rupert the Roo – A toy kangaroo who had been mailed from Australia and becomes a friend of the Raggy Dolls.
- Natasha – A Russian nesting doll bought by Mrs Grimes.

=== Humans ===
- Mr. Oswald "Ozzie" Grimes – The owner of the toy factory.
- Cynthia – Appeared later in the series to be Mr Grimes's love interest, and later wife.
- Florrie Fosdyke – The kind but forgetful canteen manager of the factory.
- Farmer Brown – The farmer at One Pin Farm.
- Ethel Grimes – Mr. Grimes's sister.
- Old Mrs Grimes – Mr. Grimes and Ethel's Mother.
- Oz and Boz – Ethel's badly-behaved twin sons (and Mr. Grimes's nephews), known as the Terrible Twins.

== Episodes ==
=== Series overview ===
Series	Episodes	Originally released	
Series	Episodes	First released	Last released
1	13	3 April 1986	26 February 1987
2	13	13 November 1987	28 September 1988
3	13	16 November 1988	30 August 1989
4	13	6 September 1989	30 August 1990
5	13	6 September 1990	20 December 1990
6	13	6 September 1991	13 December 1991
7	13	8 September 1992	8 December 1992
8	10	28 September 1993	7 December 1993
9	10	11 October 1994	20 December 1994

=== Series 1 ===
No. overall	No. in series	Title	Original release date	Prod. code
1	1	"The Flying Machine"	3 April 1986	101
The Raggy Dolls see a radio-controlled aeroplane fly overhead, and when it crash-lands, they decide to fix it up and fly in it.
2	2	"The Big Top"	10 April 1986	102
The Raggy Dolls wind up inside a circus tent and perform stunts as they try to make their way out.
3	3	"The Pigeon Race"	17 April 1986	103
Whilst out for a walk, Hi-Fi and Back-To-Front meet a homing pigeon that has become injured whilst tangled on some electric wires. They decide to help him, with the help of the other dolls.
4	4	"The War of the Wizards"	24 April 1986	104
With Back-To-Front's magic tricks being out of practice, Hi-Fi uses his metal detector to uncover a chest that has a real magic book in it. Back-To-Front uses the book to fix his head, but it soon causes problems.
5	5	"The Special Offer"	1 May 1986	105
The Raggy Dolls are taken to a toy shop in London and become special offers for anyone who buys a computer game. However, despite this new life, they do not wish to give up their friendship after being bought individually, which is what happens after Lucy is bought by a rich girl.
6	6	"The Litter Bugs"	8 May 1986	106
After Sad Sack gets chased by a duckling, the Raggy Dolls discover that the peaceful area of a field they are in is being littered by a careless family out on a picnic.
7	7	"The Dark Wood"	20 November 1986	201
While visiting the Dark Wood, the Raggy Dolls come to realise that the woods are under threat, because of a poacher using steel traps to catch animals.
8	8	"The Funfair"	27 November 1986	202
A man called Toby Martin comes to the factory and takes the Raggy Dolls to a funfair; they are then put on hooks as prizes for the coconut shy. However, as they see the coconuts being hit by the balls, they soon see that there is something odd about Toby Martin.
9	9	"Too Many Cooks"	4 December 1986	203
Claude enjoys food and cooking, but after seeing Florrie Fosdyke bake a cake for the factory competition, he is disgusted with her poor efforts. The dolls decide to help her out by replacing it with an even better cake.
10	10	"After the Storm"	11 December 1986	204
After a storm, the Raggy Dolls decide to visit Pumpernickle but find him lying on the ground. They also notice that Farmer Brown is not around to help the animals, so, with the help of Rufus the sheepdog, they find him stuck in an old mineshaft and decide to rescue him.
11	11	"Christmas Dolls"	18 December 1986	205
One snowy Christmas Eve, the Raggy Dolls decide to go tobogganing in the snow, but Sad Sack meanwhile wishes he was still back in bed. The dolls end up crashing into the doors of a children's hospital, where they become temporary Christmas presents for sick children.
12	12	"The Trouble with Claude"	19 February 1987	206
After hearing about a French Week being held at Bunce's Emporium, the Raggy Dolls decide to go there to have a look, only for Claude to get into a lot of trouble after wandering off. From there, he gets lost and meets another French doll called Babette.
13	13	"Happy Binday"	26 February 1987	207
It is Princess's "binday", and she feels that she is being ignored as her friends get the preparations for the party ready in secret. She decides to reward them with a flight on an owl.

=== Series 2 ===
No. overall	No. in series	Title	Original release date	Prod. code
14	1	"The Genius"	13 November 1987	301
An American artist, Andre G. Hamburger, needs inspiration for his new work and takes Dotty and Back-To-Front. Only when Hi-Fi rescues them, do they end up making his art even more famous.
15	2	"Speaking French"	20 November 1987	302
Claude teaches the Raggy Dolls French. At first, Princess tries, then the rest of the Raggy Dolls, except Sad Sack, who thinks it is silly until he comes across a troubled French doll in an apple tree.
16	3	"The Winter Swan"	27 November 1987	303
The Raggy Dolls find a swan in distress one cold winter's night and decide to help it.
17	4	"The Terrible Twins"	4 December 1987	304
Mr. Grimes's twin nephews come to visit him for the weekend and cause problems, not just for him, but for the Raggy Dolls as well.
18	5	"Sports Day"	11 December 1987	305
The Raggy Dolls hold a Sports Day, and everyone enjoys it, except for Sad Sack.
19	6	"To the Rescue"	8 January 1988	306
The Raggy Dolls help repair a knitted doll that they find thrown away at the dump.
20	7	"Spring Toys"	19 August 1988	401
Mr. Grimes is running out of ideas, and it is up to the Raggy Dolls to help him, in order to keep his business running.
21	8	"A Trip to the Sea"	26 August 1988	402
Mr. Grimes visits the seaside for a holiday, and the Raggy Dolls follow.
22	9	"The Royal Tour"	2 September 1988	403
Princess feels like she is not royal enough, so the Raggy Dolls dress her up in fancy clothes and give her a royal tour around the countryside, but things do not go according to plan when her coronet is stolen and eaten by a magpie and a fierce bull chases her, because her dress is red.
23	10	"Onion Soup"	7 September 1988	404
Claude gets himself into trouble after looking for onion soup, made by Florrie, and ends up being put inside a saucepan.
24	11	"Moving House"	14 September 1988	405
Dotty decides that the dolls should move to a new home. But when night falls and a storm takes place, she climbs inside a hollow tree for shelter. When the other Raggy Dolls hear she is in trouble, they build a raft and set off to the rescue.
25	12	"Factory Mice"	21 September 1988	406
After giving a baby mouse some of their picnic food, the Raggy Dolls tell it where they got it. The next day, the factory is overtaken by a huge hoard of mice, and they now have to find a way to get rid of them.
26	13	"A Trip to France"	28 September 1988	407
The Raggy Dolls sail on a toy boat and end up lost at sea. They end up on a beach which Claude thinks is France, and camp there before sailing back home. In the end, Dotty discovers they were on an island in the middle of the sea.

=== Series 3 ===
No. overall	No. in series	Title	Original release date	Prod. code
27	1	"Hot Air Balloon"	16 November 1988	501
The Raggy Dolls have fun watching clouds when a hot air balloon lands in the big field. The pilot leaves a boy in charge and while looking for help, the boy accidentally climbs in and is knocked unconscious as the balloon takes off by high winds, and it is up to the dolls to save the boy.
28	2	"Ghosts"	23 November 1988	502
One night, Lucy wants to be brave for once, and manages to succeed when she and the other Raggy Dolls met up with some spooky skeleton dolls.
29	3	"The Tree House"	30 November 1988	503
The Raggy Dolls decide to build a treehouse as a place to hang out. While they are building, they notice that a magpie has been stealing jewellery from Mr. Grimes’ Toy Factory.
30	4	"The Memory Machine"	7 December 1988	504
Claude comes up with an idea for all the Raggy Dolls to dance for the evenings, and while planning to do that, they then find in the reject bin a Memory Machine with faulty answers. They manage to fix it, in return of it lighting up the disco.
31	5	"Doll Overboard"	14 December 1988	505
The Raggy Dolls decide to go for a sail, only for them to have a rough time with speed boats.
32	6	"The Unlucky Hedgehog"	21 December 1988	506
It's autumn, and the Raggy Dolls decide to camouflage their treehouse. While gathering things, they find a stubborn hedgehog living in a bonfire in which would soon be set alight.
33	7	"Easter Bunny"	19 July 1989	601
The Raggy Dolls find out what happens when a greedy rabbit eats too many chocolate eggs.
34	8	"In Days of Old"	26 July 1989	602
Sad Sack has trouble drawing a picture, so he decides to read a book about a magic sword, which then causes him to have the most amazing dream he ever has.
35	9	"The Old Clock Lady"	2 August 1989	603
Grimes Soft Toys have a clearout. The Raggy Dolls find themselves thrown in a skip and taken to the town dump. A poor old lady visits the dump looking for scrap items to sell so that she can make some money to buy herself food. She spots the Raggy Dolls in the skip and takes them home with her. In return for her kindness, the Raggy Dolls help the woman by repairing all the broken clocks that she has so that she can sell them.
36	10	"Peace and Quiet"	9 August 1989	604
It's a peaceful day in the Raggy Dolls' new treehouse until they are interrupted by jets and aeroplanes.
37	11	"We are Not Amused"	16 August 1989	605
The Raggy Dolls find an amusement park but they soon discover that it is not much fun at all.
38	12	"The Lost Puppy"	23 August 1989	606
Mr. Grimes looks after his sister Ethel's puppy. The Raggy Dolls spot the puppy getting into all kinds of trouble, and eventually go missing.
39	13	"Horse Sense"	30 August 1989	607
The Raggy Dolls find something strange in the big field, which turns out to be horse jumps for a Welsh pony, belonging to Farmer Brown's daughter that then has an accident. Once again, the Raggy Dolls come to the rescue.

=== Series 4 ===
No. overall	No. in series	Title	Original release date	Prod. code
40	1	"The Terrible Storm"	6 September 1989	608
The Raggy Dolls fix their new treehouse after it is damaged in a storm.
41	2	"The Stolen Parrot"	13 September 1989	609
The Raggy Dolls help a sea captain's pet parrot who had been birdnapped by robbers.
42	3	"Crazy Golf"	20 September 1989	610
Mr Grimes plays a game of golf, so, feeling inspired, the Raggy Dolls decide to make a game of crazy golf for themselves.
43	4	"Pumpernickle's Party"	28 June 1990	701
The Raggy Dolls try to help Pumpernickle by scaring all the crows away.
44	5	"So Safari"	5 July 1990	702
Mr. Grimes's terrible twin nephews are on a trip to a safari park. The Raggy Dolls follow them with the help of the safari park animals.
45	6	"Making Faces"	12 July 1990	703
In an attempt to cheer Sad Sack up, the Raggy Dolls hold a puppet show to make him believe in himself.
46	7	"The Old Windmill"	19 July 1990	704
The Raggy Dolls find an old windmill.
47	8	"The Little Carthorse"	26 July 1990	705
The Raggy Dolls, with a little help from Hercules the farm horse, meet a little carthorse who does not know who he is.
48	9	"Making Jam"	2 August 1990	706
The Raggy Dolls harvest crabapples and blackberries and decide to make jam with them.
49	10	"The Teddy Bear's Picnic"	9 August 1990	707
While the Raggy Dolls are having a picnic, they meet Mr. Grimes's long-lost teddy bear, Old Edward, who had been lost for a very long time. The Raggy Dolls fix his broken arm and give him a new button eye, and in no time at all, he is as good as new.
50	11	"Mr. Marmalade"	16 August 1990	708
The Raggy Dolls have had quite enough of Mr. Marmalade's tricks after scaring them. While making their way to the factory, they are terrified by a rat, so Mr. Marmalade tries to rescue them by scaring the rat away.
51	12	"The Treasure Hunt"	23 August 1990	709
Mr. Marmalade give the Raggy Dolls clues as they go on a search for hidden treasure.
52	13	"Rupert the Roo"	30 August 1990	710
Sad Sack meets a toy kangaroo, named Rupert the Roo, who had been mailed from Australia, so the Raggy Dolls try to help him out before he can head back to Australia.

=== Series 5 ===
No. overall	No. in series	Title	Original release date	Prod. code
53	1	"Witch is Which?"	6 September 1990	711
When a witch tries to spoil their Halloween Party, the other Raggy Dolls think her magic is the surprise laser show promised by Back-To-Front and Hi-Fi, and their laughter drives the witch away. When the boys explain that their show did not work, the Raggy Dolls make sure to laugh all the way home.
54	2	"Bonfire Night"	13 September 1990	712
The Raggy Dolls explain the significance of 5 November to Claude and set out to watch a firework display. Claude is captured by a group of boys who are planning their own bonfire in an abandoned paint factory. They tie Claude to a rocket and light their bonfire, oblivious to the sparks, which set the factory alight. Hi-Fi calls the Fire Brigade, but before they can arrive, a spark sets off the boys' box of fireworks and drives them away. In the commotion, the Raggy Dolls free Claude, just before a spark ignites the rocket.
55	3	"Rainbow's End"	20 September 1990	713
Princess learns that good friends are worth more than a whole pot of gold.
56	4	"Lost in Space"	27 September 1990	714
The Raggy Dolls are kidnapped by aliens from another planet and Hi-Fi befriends an alien who stammers just like him.
57	5	"Roman Ramblers"	4 October 1990	715
The Raggy Dolls go hiking but get lost in the hot weather. Luckily, the Romans have left handy signposts to help them find their way again. Sad Sack dreams about life in Roman times.
58	6	"The Great Expedition"	11 October 1990	716
The Raggy Dolls go on an adventure in the jungle and meet a lonely gorilla.
59	7	"The Twitcher"	18 October 1990	717
The Raggy Dolls find out who the Twitcher is.
60	8	"Too Bossy"	25 October 1990	718
Dotty learns a valuable lesson about being bossy.
61	9	"The Toy Fair"	1 November 1990	719
The Raggy Dolls are at a toy fair when a monkey causes chaos and takes over the fair.
62	10	"Ragamuffin"	8 November 1990	720
The Raggy Dolls meets Ragamuffin, a wandering traveller doll who had lost his owner and decided to spend his life taking in new sights and experiences of his adventures.
63	11	"Grand Prix Dolls"	15 November 1990	721
Ragamuffin and the Raggy Dolls play Grand Prix games.
64	12	"Fond Farewells"	22 November 1990	722
The Raggy Dolls gives Ragamuffin a teary farewell.
65	13	"Doctor Dolls"	20 December 1990	723
The Raggy Dolls play a game of doctors and nurses.

=== Series 6 ===
No. overall	No. in series	Title	Original release date	Prod. code
66	1	"Old Fashioned Dolls"	6 September 1991	801
The Raggy Dolls teach Edward about old-fashioned things from the past.
67	2	"Lady Luck"	13 September 1991	802
The Raggy Dolls meets a mysterious woman called Lady Luck who takes them on an adventure they will never forget.
68	3	"Invisible Dolls"	20 September 1991	803
The Raggy Dolls are invisible today.
69	4	"The Great Outdoors"	27 September 1991	804
The Raggy Dolls hitch a ride with Mr. Grimes when he goes camping. After setting up their home-made tents and sleeping bags, they notice that a rock climber is in trouble. The Raggy Dolls come to his rescue.
70	5	"The Lonely Echo"	18 October 1991	805
While staying in the countryside, the Raggy Dolls meet a lonely cliff.
71	6	"Homeward Bound"	25 October 1991	806
The Raggy Dolls learns that there is no place like home.
74	9	"Railway Dolls"	1 November 1991	807
The Raggy Dolls enjoy a day at the railway station.
75	10	"Windy Weather"	8 November 1991	808
The wind blows a young crow out of its nest. With the help of Back-To-Front's kite and a helpful cow, the Raggy Dolls manage to return him to the treetops.
76	11	"Purple Diamonds"	15 November 1991	809
The Raggy Dolls dig up a troublesome rock. Thinking they have discovered valuable purple diamonds, they dream of what they would do with their riches, until Mr. Marmalade, the factory cat, explains that is only amethyst, and worth very little.
77	12	"The Giant Bumblebee"	22 November 1991	810
Mr. Grimes' sister leaves the terrible twins Oz and Boz with Mr Grimes. He suggests they collect insects to study, but when the Raggy Dolls find that they have trapped the insects in a jar without air-holes, they dress up Sad Sack as a giant bumblebee to teach the twins a lesson.
78	13	"The Return of the Roo"	29 November 1991	811
The Raggy Dolls are excited when Rupert returns from Australia.
79	14	"The Boomerang Games"	6 December 1991	812
Rupert teaches the Raggy Dolls how to use a boomerang.

=== Series 7 ===
No. overall	No. in series	Title	Original release date	Prod. code
80	1	"The Royal County Show"	8 September 1992	901
The Raggy Dolls and Rupert the Roo visit the Royal County Show.
81	2	"Open Day"	15 September 1992	902
The Raggy Dolls and Rupert the Roo visit an Open Day with great results.
82	3	"The Town Carnival"	22 September 1992	903
The Raggy Dolls visit a town carnival with over-the-top results.
83	4	"Cave Dolls"	29 September 1992	904
The Raggy Dolls dream about life in the Stone Age.
84	5	"Barbecue Ball"	6 October 1992	905
The Raggy Dolls have a barbecue ball and Claude asks Princess if she would like to dance.
85	6	"High and Dry"	13 October 1992	906
Sad Sack accidentally steers 'The Spirit of Adventure' into a sandbank, leading him to discover a secret cave on the beach.
86	7	"Smugglers Cave"	27 October 1992	907
Sad Sack befriends the ghost of a fisherman who tells stories of the seven seas.
87	8	"William the Conker"	3 November 1992	908
The Raggy Dolls play conkers.
88	9	"Bonnie Scotland"	10 November 1992	909
The Raggy Dolls travel to Scotland.
89	10	"On the Town"	17 November 1992	910
The Raggy Dolls visit London with Ragamuffin.
90	11	"Danger, Men at Work"	24 November 1992	911
While holidaying in London, there is trouble for the Raggy Dolls and the workmen.
91	12	"Sight-Seeing Dolls"	1 December 1992	912
The Raggy Dolls tour London with their friend Ragamuffin.
92	13	"Dolls on Wheels"	8 December 1992	913
Hi-Fi and Back-To-Front build a skateboard and run into trouble with finding the right wheels for the job. Rupert the Roo brings them the wheels from Mr. Grimes's tea trolley. Sad Sack doubts that these are the best wheels for a skateboard, and it looks like he may be right.

=== Series 8 ===
No. overall	No. in series	Title	Original release date	Prod. code
93	1	"Robot Canteen"	28 September 1993	1001
After Florrie steps out to do some shopping, Mr. Grimes hires a robot to do the hard work as the Raggy Dolls try to devise a plan to get Florrie back.
94	2	"Mister Mole"	5 October 1993	1002
The Raggy Dolls meet a mole while having a picnic.
95	3	"The Empty House"	12 October 1993	1003
While testing a toy aeroplane until it lands on an empty house, the Raggy Dolls try to find it before heading back home with a flight on an owl.
96	4	"Mon Repose"	19 October 1993	1004
Mr. Grimes goes on holiday near the seaside, but things do not go according to plan when the Raggy Dolls try to help people from getting washed away by the sea.
97	5	"The Runaway Monkey"	26 October 1993	1005
The Raggy Dolls make plans to catch a mischievous monkey.
98	6	"Lucy's Greenhouse"	2 November 1993	1006
After the cabbages in Lucy's garden are eaten by slugs, the Raggy Dolls build a greenhouse for her. Overcome by the heat, she dreams she shrinks in size and meets many strange plants and insects. The Raggy Dolls rescue her, but she realises even pests have to eat.
99	7	"The Horrible Princesses"	9 November 1993	1007
Three haughty princess dolls make fun of Princess, but the Raggy Dolls convince them that a terrible wizard is on their trail so they can teach them all a lesson.
100	8	"The Town Gala"	16 November 1993	1008
The Raggy Dolls watch Cynthia and Mr. Grimes doing a skydive at the town gala.
101	9	"Mr. Grimes in Love"	23 November 1993	1009
The Raggy Dolls decide to write a love letter to Mr. Grimes thinking it was from Cynthia Popplethwaite.
102	10	"Wedding Bells"	7 December 1993	1010
Mr. Grimes is too shy to declare his feelings to Cynthia Popplethwaite, so the Raggy Dolls play cupid. When Mr. Grimes and Cynthia get married, she brings the Raggy Dolls with her to the cottage so they can all live happily ever after.

=== Series 9 ===
No. overall	No. in series	Title	Original release date	Prod. code
103	1	"Off on a Honeymoon"	11 October 1994	1101
Newlyweds Mr. Grimes and Cynthia Popplethwaite go on their honeymoon. The Raggy Dolls, feeling very proud of Mr. Grimes after his marriage, decide to follow the couple inside their suitcase.
104	2	"A Mediterranean Cruise"	18 October 1994	1102
After arriving in Spain via cruise liner, Princess is captured by a monkey. It's up to the Raggy Dolls to save her before heading back to the cruise liner with the help of some seagulls.
105	3	"Stormy Weather"	25 October 1994	1103
The Raggy Dolls decide to make a paddling pool to swim in until a storm arrives.
106	4	"When in Rome"	1 November 1994	1104
After arriving in Italy, the Raggy Dolls try to help an Italian alley cat by finding its lost kitten.
107	5	"Just a Minotaur"	8 November 1994	1105
While visiting an ancient temple in Greece, leaving crisps and peanuts for a trail, the Raggy Dolls find a lizard who knows the way out of the temple, until it is revealed that the "Minotaur" is only just Mr. Grimes carrying a bicycle thanks to one of Back-To-Front's pranks.
108	6	"The Eyes of Rami"	15 November 1994	1106
While on a trip to Egypt, the Raggy Dolls are tricked by a scorpion, until they meet an Egyptian princess doll named Shehabi, who helps them find emeralds for the eyes of a princess statue named Rami, before it magically sends them back home to the Reject bin.
109	7	"Elephants do Forget"	22 November 1994	1107
The Raggy Dolls and Mr. Marmalade help a baby elephant by trying to remember everything and scaring it with a help of a mouse caught by Mr. Marmalade.
110	8	"What's the Time?"	6 December 1994	1108
The Raggy Dolls try to help Sad Sack try to remember the time.
111	9	"The Russian Doll"	13 December 1994	1109
Natasha, a Russian nesting doll of seven in the care of Mrs Grimes, becomes friends with the Raggy Dolls, Rupert the Roo, and Old Edward.
112	10	"Bored"	20 December 1994	1110
Rupert the Roo is bored of talking to Natasha and Old Edward, so he decides to join the Raggy Dolls on a boat ride. They discover a film crew, along with some famous actors and actresses, filming a scene for a film on the bridge of the water pond. As they see Rupert, one of the actors throws him over the bridge and later on, Rupert finds out that he is not bored anymore. Series finale.

== Later broadcasts ==
After the series ended, The Raggy Dolls later aired in repeats on digital television on the now-defunct children's network Carlton Kids, and then on free-for-air satellite television on Tiny Pop.

The series was broadcast in numerous countries around the world.

== Merchandise ==
Three videos (with five episodes each) were released during the late 1980s by Castle Communications Plc, each featuring a selection of episodes from the first two series narrated by Neil Innes. They were later re-released in Australia during the early 1990s by Castle Communications Australia.

- The Raggy Dolls (CAV 1008) – "The Big Top", "After the Storm", "The Dark Wood", "The Genius", "The Winter Swan".
- The Raggy Dolls 2 (CAV 1014) – "The Flying Machine", "The Pigeon Race", "The Fun Fair", "Too Many Cooks", "The Terrible Twins".
- The Raggy Dolls 3 (CVI 1022) – "Spring Toys", "A Trip to the Sea", "A Royal Tour", "Onion Soup", "Moving House".

In the spring of 1993, 4 Front Video released one VHS tape as part of its 'Pocket Money Video' sub-label (Cat No. 0867323) with six episodes:
"The Flying Machine", "The Pigeon Race", "The Fun Fair", "Spring Toys", "A Trip to the Sea", "A Royal Tour".

The complete first series of The Raggy Dolls was released on DVD on 21 June 2010 through Revelation Films; the complete second series was available from 18 October 2010, the complete third series was available from 7 February 2011 and the complete fourth series was released on 6 June 2011, but the complete fifth series was never released.

=== Books ===
A series of at least ten books were published in 1990 by both Boxtree Limited (in association with Yorkshire Television Limited) and ABC Enterprises (for the Australian Broadcasting Corporation). The books were written or adapted by Neil Innes and illustrated by Steve Smallman. Titles include:

- The Big Top
- The Flying Machine
- The Hot Air Balloon
- In Days of Old
- Moving House
- The Pigeon Race
- The Royal Tour
- The Stolen Parrot
- The Tree House
- A Trip to the Sea
- We Are Not Amused
- The War Of The Wizards
