= That's Your Funeral =

- Film poster
- Created by: Peter Lewis
- Starring: Bill Fraser; Raymond Huntley; David Battley
- Country of origin: United Kingdom
- No. of episodes: 6 × 30 mins, 1 × 30 min pilot

Production
- Producer: BBC
- Running time: 30 minutes per episode

Original release
- Network: BBC One
- Release: 25 March 1970 (pilot) – 26 February 1971

That's Your Funeral is a 1971 BBC sitcom written by Peter Lewis and starring Bill Fraser, Raymond Huntley and David Battley, about a North of England funeral business. Storylines used urban legends about the funeral industry. It ran for one series of six episodes, following the pilot episode "Last Tribute" broadcast as the 25 March 1970 edition of Comedy Playhouse.

A similar theme was used in the ITV sitcom In Loving Memory.

BBC One Scotland and BBC One Northern Ireland dropped the show to accommodate their regional programmes during the timeslot in which That's Your Funeral aired on the network BBC One and BBC One Wales.

== Cast ==
- Bill Fraser as Basil Bulstrode
- Raymond Huntley as Emanuel Holroyd
- David Battley as Percy
- David King as Charlie
- Dudley Foster as Grimthorpe
- Betty Huntley-Wright as Mrs. Holroyd
- George Howe as Parson

== Film spinoff ==
The sitcom was adapted into a film version by Hammer Films, theatrically released in 1973, distributed by Fox-Rank.

The plot concerns two rival undertakers whose firms are used as fronts for drug smuggling. Directed by John Robins, in addition the TV cast it featured Roy Kinnear, Dennis Price, Sue Lloyd, Richard Wattis, John Ronane and Frank Thornton. The film performed poorly at the box office.

== See also ==
- List of films based on British sitcoms
