= How Sweet to Be an Idiot =

1973 album by Neil Innes

Studio album by Neil Innes
- Released: 1973 (UK)
- Recorded: March – July 1973
- Studio: Chipping Norton Studio, Oxfordshire
- Genre: Pop/rock
- Length: 37:56
- Label: United Artists
- Producer: Neil Innes

Neil Innes chronology
How Sweet to Be an Idiot (1973)	The Rutland Weekend Songbook (1976)

Professional ratings
Review scores
Source	Rating
AllMusic	2/5 stars

Re-Cycled Vinyl Blues

Studio album by Neil Innes
- Released: 1994 (UK)
- Recorded: 1973
- Genre: Pop/rock
- Label: EMI
- Producer: Neil Innes

Professional ratings
Review scores
Source	Rating
AllMusic	4/5 stars

How Sweet to Be an Idiot is the first solo album by Neil Innes, formerly of the Bonzo Dog Doo-Dah Band, and was released in 1973.

== Release ==
The title track was released as a single (with B-side "The Age of Desperation") but failed to chart. It was a more instrumented version than on the album, arranged by Richard Hewson. Its melody was borrowed by Oasis for their single "Whatever", released in 1994; Innes claimed plagiarism and as a result received royalties and a co-writing credit.

The album was re-released by United Artists in 1980 under the title Neil Innes A-Go-Go and by EMI in 1994 with additional tracks – most of which had been released on singles – under the title Re-Cycled Vinyl Blues. This edition of the album was dedicated to Ollie Halsall, who had died in 1992, and former Bonzo Dog bassist Dennis Cowan, who had died in 1972; it featured a guest appearance by Michael Palin on the title track.

Innes later said of this time the album was recorded,

United Artists had been very kind to me ... In my own way, I wanted to repay them – by making a bunch of silly singles at a time when the music industry still seemed to have a sense of humour. Wrong again.

Innes performed the title song on Monty Python Live at the Hollywood Bowl and on Monty Python Live at Drury Lane. Surviving members of Monty Python performed the song for Terry Jones's funeral at Golders Green Cemetery.

== Reception ==
Stewart Mason, reviewing the album for AllMusic, described it as "split between tongue-in-cheek parody and straight pop songs" and containing "solidly melodic Beatlesque pop", but was critical of the "unfortunate sterility to Innes' self-production".

A review of the release by Mark Deming of AllMusic was more appreciative than that of his predecessor, saying that "most [of the tracks] walk a graceful tightrope between sly humor and solid pop-friendly rock & roll" and recommending that "anyone who digs a great hook played with heart should get to know the music of Neil Innes".

== Track listing ==
- All songs written by Neil Innes
- How Sweet to Be an Idiot and Neil Innes-A-Go-Go have identical track listings

=== Side one ===
1. "Prologue" – 0:49
2. "Momma Bee" – 2:47*
3. "Immortal Invisible" – 4:04*
4. "Topless A-Go-Go" – 4:08
5. "Feel No Shame" – 6:12

=== Side two ===
1. "How Sweet To Be An Idiot" – 2:45
2. "Dream On" – 3:04 [listed as "Dream" on Neil Innes-A-Go-Go]
3. "L'Amour Perdu" – 2:10
4. "Song For Yvonne" – 2:52*
5. "This Love of Ours" – 2:57*
6. "Singing A Song Is Easy" – 5:08

=== Track listing for Re-Cycled Vinyl Blues ===
1. "Re-Cycled Vinyl Blues" – 3:33
2. "Angelina" – 2:50
3. "Come Out into the Open" – 3:42
4. "Prologue" – 0:51
5. "Momma Bee" – 2:54
6. "Lie Down and Be Counted" – 3:09
7. "Immortal Invisible" – 4:12
8. "Age of Desperation" – 2:34
9. "Topless-A-Go-Go" – 4:04
10. "Feel No Shame" – 6:24
11. "How Sweet To Be an Idiot" – 2:51
12. "Dream On" – 3:05
13. "L'Amour Perdu" – 2:17
14. "Song for Yvonne" – 2:57
15. "This Love of Ours" – 3:04
16. "Fluff on the Needle" – 5:36
17. "Singing a Song Is Easy" – 5:04
18. "Bandwagon" (Live) – 4:31

== Personnel ==
- Neil Innes – vocals, guitar, piano
- Andy Roberts – rhythm guitar
- Mike Kellie – drums
- Dave Richards – bass guitar
- Ollie Halsall – lead guitar, organ
- Gerry Conway – drums on *
- The Mucrons – backing vocals
- Dennis Cowan – guitar on additional tracks for re-release
