= The Innes Book of Records =

Studio album by Neil Innes
- Released: 1979 (UK)
- Genre: Pop/rock
- Label: Polydor
- Producer: Neil Innes & Steve James

Neil Innes chronology
Taking Off (1977)	The Innes Book of Records (1979)	Off the Record (1982)

Professional ratings
Review scores
Source	Rating
Allmusic	3.5/5 stars

The Innes Book of Records is the third solo album by Neil Innes and was released in 1979 to accompany the BBC television series of the same name. The audio recordings on the album are not the same as those used as the audio track for the television series, some of the arrangements being markedly different.

Reviewer Richie Unterberger, of Allmusic, described it as "imbued with the characteristic droll, wry wit and knack for pastiche of all manners of pop music that typify Innes' work", and noted that it veered "more to Ray Davies territory than comedy rock, though Innes isn't at all imitative of the Kinks.".

== Track listing ==
All tracks written by Neil Innes.

=== Side one ===
1. "Here We Go Again" - 3:20
2. "Montana Cafe" - 3:31
3. "All In the Name of Love" - 3:43
4. "Kenny and Liza" - 3:48
5. "Amoeba Boogie" - 4:27

=== Side two ===
1. "Theme" (instrumental) - 2:51
2. "Human Race" - 4:30
3. "Spontaneous" - 3:41
4. "Love Is Getting Deeper" - 3:34
5. "Etcetera" - 3:49

== Musicians ==
- Drums: Stuart Elliot, Peter Van Hooke
- Bass: Bruce Lynch, Harvey Weston
- Keyboards: Billy Livsey
- Guitars: Brian Holloway, Richard Brunton, Mitch Dalton
- Piano: Brian Lemon
- Vocals: Sharon Campbell, Yvonne Keeley, Anne Kavanagh, Paul Travis, Kenny Dukayne, Gary Travers
- Trumpets: Henry Lowther, Digby Fairweather, Martin Drover, Dave Spence
- Trombones: John Mumford, Paul Nieman, Pete Strange
- Saxophone: Bill Skeat, Randy Colville, Tommy Whittle, Keith Gemmell, Pat Kyle
- Strings: Leader: Richard Studt (special thanks to Nigel Warren-Green)
- Arrangements: John Altman
