= Taking Off (Neil Innes album) =

Studio album by Neil Innes
- Released: April 1977 (UK)
- Studio: Rockfield Studios, Monmouth; IBC Studios, London
- Genre: Pop/rock
- Length: 35:46
- Label: Arista
- Producer: Neil Innes

Neil Innes chronology
| The Rutland Weekend Songbook (1976) | Taking Off (1977) | The Innes Book of Records (1979) |

Professional ratings
Review scores
| Source | Rating |
|---|---|
| Allmusic | 3/5 stars |

Taking Off is the second solo album by Neil Innes and was released in 1977.

In 2005 the album was released on CD, paired with The Innes Book of Records.

== Track listing ==
All songs written by Neil Innes

1. "Crystal Balls" - 2:57
2. "Catch Phrase" - 2:48
3. "God is Love" - 3:42
4. "Randy Raquel" - 3:23
5. "Shangri-La" - 3:51
6. "Drama On a Saturday Night" - 4:59
7. "Dreams Shine Through" - 3:50
8. "Busy Day" - 3:26
9. "Three Piece Suite" - 3:35
10. "La Vie En Rose" - 3:15

== Personnel ==
- Neil Innes - vocals, piano, arrangements
- John Halsey - drums
- Timi Donald - drums
- Brian Hodgson - bass guitar
- Alan James - bass guitar
- Richard Lee - double bass
- Billy Bremner - guitar
- Roger Rettig - guitar, steel guitar
- John Megginson - piano, arrangements
- Julian Smedley - vocals, violin
- Keith Nelson - banjo
- Willie Fahey - flute, saxophone
- Jon Field - congas
- Brian Bowles - vocals
- Sue Jones-Davies - vocals

Technical

- Hugh Jones, Dave Charles - engineer
