= Off the Record (Neil Innes album) =

Studio album by Neil Innes
- Released: November 1982 (UK)
- Recorded: The Workhouse Recording Studios
- Genre: Pop/rock
- Label: MMC Records
- Producer: Neil Innes & Steve James

Neil Innes chronology
The Innes Book of Records (1979)	Off the Record (1982)

Off The Record is the fourth solo album by Neil Innes and was released in 1982 featuring songs from the second and third BBC television series of The Innes Book of Records.

== Track listing ==
All tracks written by Neil Innes

=== Side one ===
1. "Libido" - 3:27
2. "City of the Angels" - 3:13
3. "Them" - 3:22
4. "Time to Kill" - 2:46
5. "Rock of Ages" - 3:22

=== Side two ===
1. "One Thing On Your Mind" - 4:38
2. "The Worm and the Angel" - 2:39
3. "Not Getting Any Younger" - 4:08
4. "Take Away" - 3:29
5. "Happy Ending" - 2:28

=== Side three ===
1. "Stoned on Rock" - 2:54
2. "Knicker Elastic King" - 2:39
3. "Spaghetti Western" - 4:11
4. "Mr. Eurovision" - 1:57
5. "Ungawa" - 3:56

=== Side four ===
1. "Godfrey Daniel" - 2:54
2. "Fortune Teller" - 3:00
3. "Mother" - 3:06
4. "Burlesque" - 2:47
5. "Down That Road" - 3:22

Single disc, as issued in Canada (Attic LAT 1164)

=== Side one ===
1. "Libido" - 3:30
2. "City of the Angels" - 3:19
3. "Them" - 3:26
4. "Rock of Ages" - 3:25
5. "Take Away" - 3:31
6. "Happy Ending" - 2:27

=== Side two ===
1. "Knicker Elastic King" - 4:10
2. "Mr. Eurovision" - 2:30
3. "Ungawa" - 4:00
4. "Godfrey Daniel" - 2:57
5. "Mother" - 2:48
6. "Down That Road" - 3:23

== Personnel ==
- Neil Innes is credited as "star"
- Guitar : Ollie Halsall, Lee Fothergill, Mitch Dalton
- Bass guitar : Mo Foster, Paul Westwood
- Pedal guitar : Roger Rettig
- Piano : Morgan Fisher, Keith Nichols
- Banjo : Keith Nelson
- Accordion : Jack Emblow
- Guitar/Banjo : Dick Abel
- Trumpet : Dave Spencer, Digby Fairweather, Alan Downey, Martin Drover, Henry Lowther
- Trombone : Pete Strange, Paul Nieman, Pete Strange, Malcolm Griffiths
- Tuba : Graham Read
- Violins : Geoffrey Salmon, Gerry Richards, Dick Studt, Gavyn Wright, Laurie Lewis, Norman Lederman, Lennox Mackenzie, Bruce Dukov
- Viola : Danny Dagger
- Cello : Charles Ford, Nigel Warren-Green, Alan Dalziel
- Double Bass - Harvey Weston
- Woodwind : Bill Skeat, Randy Colville
- Saxophone : Bob Sydor, John Altman
- Saxophone & flute : Keith Gemmell, Pat Kyle
- Drums : Kenny Clare, Peter Van Hooke, Bob Wackett
- Percussion : Frank Ricotti, Louis Jardim, Chris Karan
- Backing vocals : Gary Taylor, Linda Taylor, Joy Yates, Annie Kavanagh, Neil Lancaster, Chas Mills, Jean Gilbert, Kim Goody, Sharon Campbell, Nick Curtis, Ken Barrie, Bob Saker, Kay Garner
