= Neil Innes =

English songwriter, writer, comedian, and musician (1944–2019)

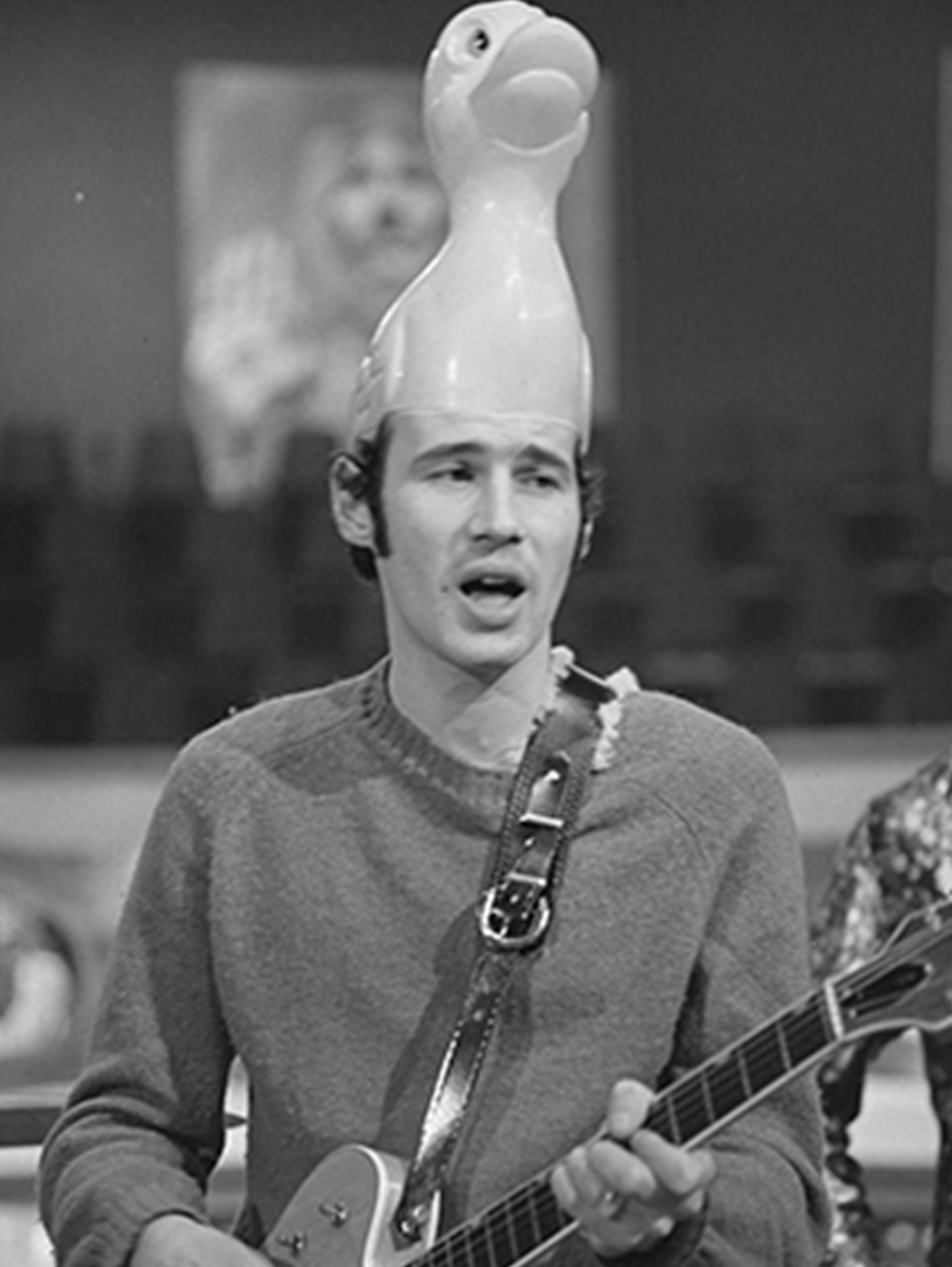
- Innes in 1968
- Born: Neil James Innes; 9 December 1944; Danbury, Essex, England
- Died: 29 December 2019 (aged 75); Montcuq, Lot, France
- Education: Norwich School of Art; Goldsmiths College
- Occupations: Comedian; musician; writer
- Years active: 1960s–2019
- Spouse: Yvonne Hilton (m. 1966)
- Children: 3
- Musical career
- Genres: Parody; satire; comedy rock
- Instruments: Vocals; piano; guitar; banjo
- Formerly of: The Bonzo Dog Doo-Dah Band; The Rutles; Fatso; The World; Grimms; The Secret Policeman's Balls for Amnesty International
- Website: neilinnes.media

Neil James Innes (/ˈɪnɪs/; 9 December 1944 – 29 December 2019) was an English songwriter, writer, comedian and musician. He first came to prominence in the comedy rock group the Bonzo Dog Doo-Dah Band and later became a frequent collaborator with the Monty Python troupe on their BBC television series and films, and is often called the "seventh Python" along with performer Carol Cleveland. Along with Eric Idle of Monty Python, he co-created the Rutles, a Beatles parody/pastiche project; Innes wrote the band's songs. He also wrote and voiced the 1980s ITV children's cartoon adventures of The Raggy Dolls.

== Early life ==
Innes was born in Danbury in Essex. His Scottish father was a warrant officer in the British Army, and Innes spent his childhood in West Germany where his father was deployed with the British Army of the Rhine. He took piano lessons from age 7 to 14 and taught himself to play guitar. His parents were supportive of their children's artistic leanings, and his father also drew and painted. After returning to the United Kingdom, Innes received his formal education at Thorpe Grammar School, the Norwich School of Art and Goldsmiths College, London, where he studied fine art. He graduated with a Bachelor of Arts in Fine Art from Goldsmiths in 1966.

== Career ==
=== The Bonzo Dog (Doo-Dah) Band ===
While still at Goldsmiths, Innes joined a semi-professional college band originally called the Bonzo Dog Dada Band (after Bonzo the dog, an illustrated cartoon character from the 1920s, and the art movement Dada), which was later renamed the Bonzo Dog Doo-Dah Band after the group tired of constantly explaining the concept of Dada to confused onlookers (and later still the band name was officially shortened to the Bonzo Dog Band). At this point the band, which then had a revolving membership of anything up to a dozen players at a time, largely performed a dada-influenced, deliberately shambolic, comedic repertoire of trad-jazz cover versions at local public houses and college events, to the delight and occasional bemusement of audiences.

Innes had met the band's co-founders Vivian Stanshall and Rodney Slater some time earlier when they and bandmate "Legs" Larry Smith were studying at the Central School of Art, but Innes' official entry into the band was actually facilitated by his then-landlord and college tutor, Vernon Dudley Bohay Nowell, who happened to be the band's bass guitarist at the time. Innes' induction into the band proved to be fundamental to their eventual success when he brought a more focused and disciplined musical direction to their efforts, with his talents as a composer, arranger and multi-instrumentalist. At the band's creative peak in 1968 and 1969, Innes, alone and together with Stanshall, composed most of the band's original material, including his solo composition (and sole Bonzos hit) "I'm the Urban Spaceman", (produced by Apollo C. Vermouth, a collective alias for Paul McCartney and Gus Dudgeon), and "Death Cab for Cutie" (with lyrics by Stanshall), which featured in the Beatles' film Magical Mystery Tour (1967). Innes won an Ivor Novello Award for Best Novel(ty) Song in 1968 for "I'm the Urban Spaceman".

During the same creatively fertile 1968/69 period, Innes and the Bonzo Dog Band also appeared each week in both seasons of the British children's television series Do Not Adjust Your Set which also featured future Monty Python members Eric Idle, Terry Jones, Michael Palin and Terry Gilliam. Although initially intended to appeal solely to children, the show's surreal and absurdist nature soon also attracted a large adult following.

After the break-up of the Bonzo Dog Band in early 1970, Innes joined with former Dog Band bassist Dennis Cowan, drummer Ian Wallace and guitarist Roger McKew to form The World, a band hoping for "more commercial" success with music ranging from rock to pure pop, yet still retaining some Doo-Dah style and even some of the humour. However, by the time their first and only album, Lucky Planet, was released in late 1970 the members had already disbanded and were moving on to other projects.

=== GRIMMS and Monty Python ===
In 1971, Innes briefly reunited with most of his former Bonzo Dog Band colleagues to record their reunion/contractual obligation album Let's Make Up and Be Friendly, and he, Vivian Stanshall and Dennis Cowan also formed a short-lived touring band named Freaks with Keith Moon on drums. This in turn led Innes and Stanshall to a union with The Scaffold and other musicians, poets and performers later that year as Grimms. While Stanshall effectively bowed out of this group soon after its formation, Innes remained as one of the permanent core members for the next five years, working with Andy Roberts, Roger McGough, John Gorman, Mike McGear, Dave Richards, Brian Patten, Adrian Henri, John Megginson, future Rutles bandmates Ollie Halsall and John Halsey, and Gerry Conway (among many others). Although GRIMMS was initially conceived purely as a touring revue-type ensemble, early 1973 saw the release of their self-titled live album, followed by a second studio-recorded album Rockin' Duck at the end of the same year. GRIMMS remained an informal enough setup throughout this period to allow the various members to come and go as they pleased and continue with their own outside musical, performing and literary careers, and in 1973 Innes also recorded his debut solo album How Sweet To Be An Idiot, aided and abetted by various GRIMMS. The group also undertook regular and extensive tours of the UK university and theatre circuit throughout its existence, releasing a book of humorous poetry, lyrics and photographs in 1974 entitled Clowns on the Road detailing some of their experiences. The final GRIMMS studio LP Sleepers was released in 1976, after which their activities as a group ceased.

In the mid-1970s Innes became closely associated with the Monty Python team, having first worked with Michael Palin, Terry Jones and Eric Idle on the 1960s television show Do Not Adjust Your Set. He contributed music to the Monty Python albums Monty Python's Previous Record (1972) and The Monty Python Matching Tie and Handkerchief (1973), and played a major role in performing and writing songs and sketches for their final TV series in 1974, after John Cleese temporarily left the troupe. He wrote a squib of a song called "George III" for the episode "The Golden Age of Ballooning", which was sung by the Flirtations but billed onscreen as the Ronettes. He also wrote the song "When Does a Dream Begin?", used in "Anything Goes: The Light Entertainment War". He co-wrote the "Most Awful Family in Britain" sketch and played a humorous stilted guitar version of the theme song, "The Liberty Bell" march, during the credits of the last episode, "Party Political Broadcast". He is one of only two non-Pythons ever to be credited writers for the TV series, the other being Douglas Adams (who co-wrote the "Patient Abuse" sketch, also featured in "Party Political Broadcast").

He appeared on stage with the Pythons in the UK and Canada in 1973, in London in 1974 and in New York City in 1976, performing the Bob Dylanesque "Protest Song" (complete with harmonica) on the album Monty Python Live at City Center. He was introduced as Raymond Scum. After his introduction he told the audience, "I've suffered for my music. Now it's your turn." In 1980, he travelled to the States with the Pythons again, subsequently appearing in Monty Python Live at the Hollywood Bowl. He performed the songs "How Sweet to Be an Idiot" and "I'm the Urban Spaceman". He also appeared as one of the singing "Bruces" in the Philosopher Sketch and as a Church Policeman in the "Salvation Fuzz" sketch.

Innes wrote original songs for the film Monty Python and the Holy Grail (1975), such as "Knights of the Round Table" and "Brave Sir Robin". He appeared in the film as a head-bashing monk, the serf crushed by the giant wooden rabbit, and the leader of Sir Robin's minstrels. He also had small roles in Terry Gilliam's Jabberwocky (1977) and Monty Python's Life of Brian (1979), and performed the whistling on the latter's hit song, "Always Look on the Bright Side of Life". His collaborations with Monty Python and other artists were documented in the musical film The Seventh Python (2008), which premiered at the Mods & Rockers Film Festival on 26 June 2008.

=== Rutland Weekend Television, The Rutles, and The Innes Book of Records ===
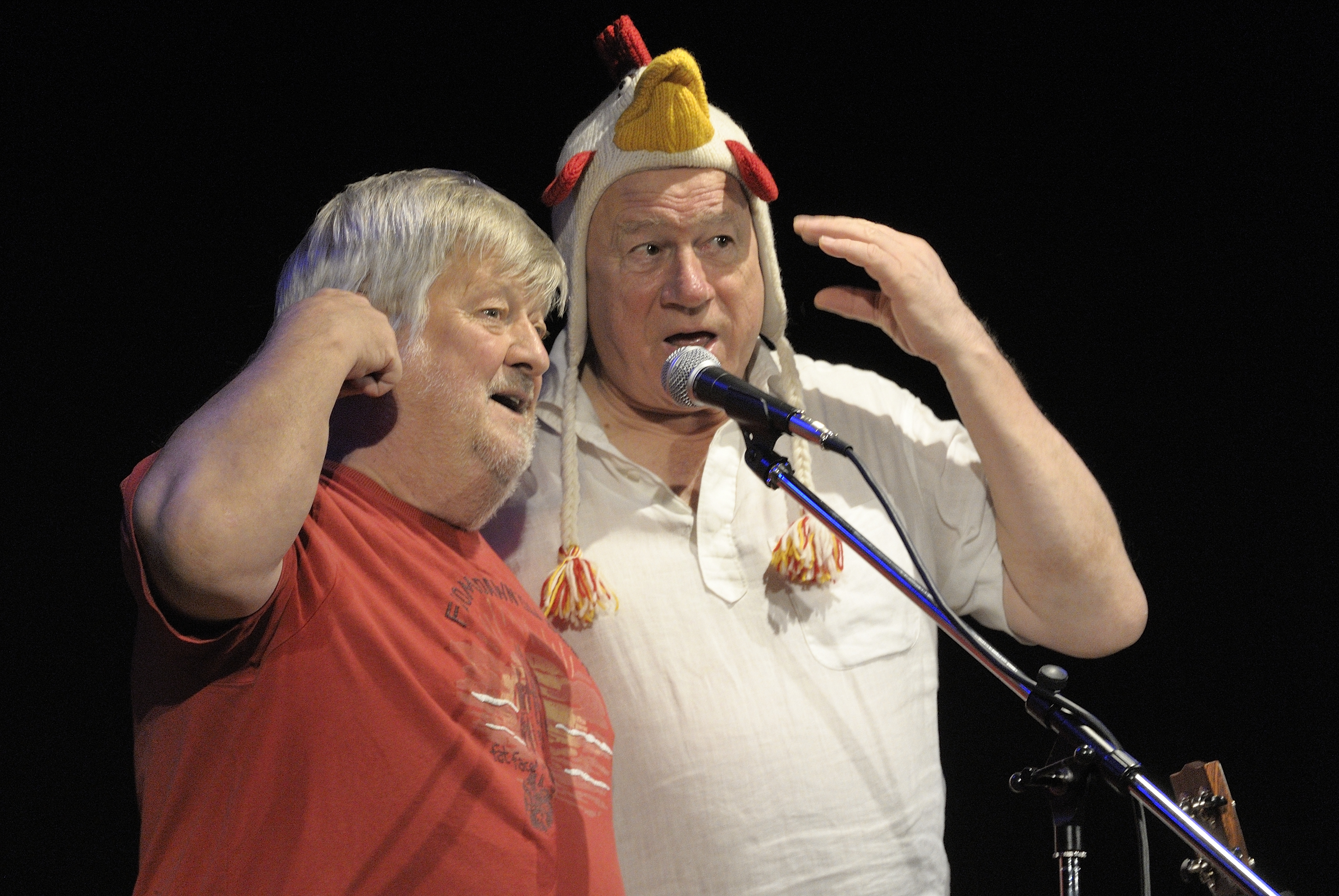
Innes with John Halsey in 2014

After Monty Python finished its original run on UK television, Innes joined Eric Idle on the series Rutland Weekend Television. This was a Pythonesque sketch show based in a fictional low-budget regional television station, which ran for two seasons in 1975–76. Songs and sketches from the series appeared on a 1976 BBC LP, The Rutland Weekend Songbook. One short sketch on the show spawned the Rutles (the "prefab four"), which was an affectionate pastiche of the Beatles. In the sketch Innes portrayed the character of Ron Nasty, a character based on John Lennon, while Idle portrayed Dirk McQuickly (a character based on Paul McCartney), and the fictional group briefly performed 'I Must Be in Love', a suitably Beatlesque pastiche written by Innes.

Eric Idle later played a videotape of the Rutles sketch on Saturday Night Live in 1976 during an appearance as guest host, and the favourable response led to a 1978 American-made spin-off TV movie, All You Need Is Cash, with Innes and Idle again playing Nasty and McQuickly. While Idle and Innes co-created the original Rutles sketch concept, Idle wrote the screenplay for the film on his own, and Innes composed all of the songs for the project without any input from Idle (Dirk McQuickly's musical contributions on the soundtrack were performed by guitarist/vocalist Ollie Halsall while Idle lip-synched them in the film). Innes' songs consequently appeared on the soundtrack album The Rutles, released by Warner Bros in 1978.

The songs written by Innes so closely pastiched the original source material that he was taken to court by the owners of the Beatles' catalogue. Innes had to testify under oath that he had not listened to the songs at all while composing the Rutles' songs, but had created them completely originally based on what he remembered various songs by the Beatles sounding like at different times. However the court ruled in favour of ATV music and imposed co-writing credits and royalties. Many years later, Innes' own music publisher demanded a co-writing credit for Innes from Beatles-influenced band Oasis, for their 1994 song "Whatever", as it directly lifted parts of its melody from Innes' 1973 song "How Sweet to Be an Idiot". This event was subsequently referenced in the Rutles' song "Shangri-La" on their 1996 reunion album The Rutles Archaeology, which was itself a parody of The Beatles Anthology.

After Rutland Weekend Television, Innes made a solo series in 1979 on BBC television, The Innes Book of Records, which ran for three series until 1981. The series offered an early example of music-video presentation, albeit on a shoestring BBC budget, centred around new recordings and alternate versions of many of Innes' older compositions along with new material written specially for the show. In keeping with Innes' usual whimsically surreal style, each episode was linked by a loose and often absurdist theme and also featured an eccentric guest performer (such as Stanley Unwin or Percy Edwards) or musician (such as Ivor Cutler or Jake Thackray). Innes' former bandmate Vivian Stanshall also appeared in one episode, reciting his own surrealist monologue about the English seaside.

=== Other television work ===
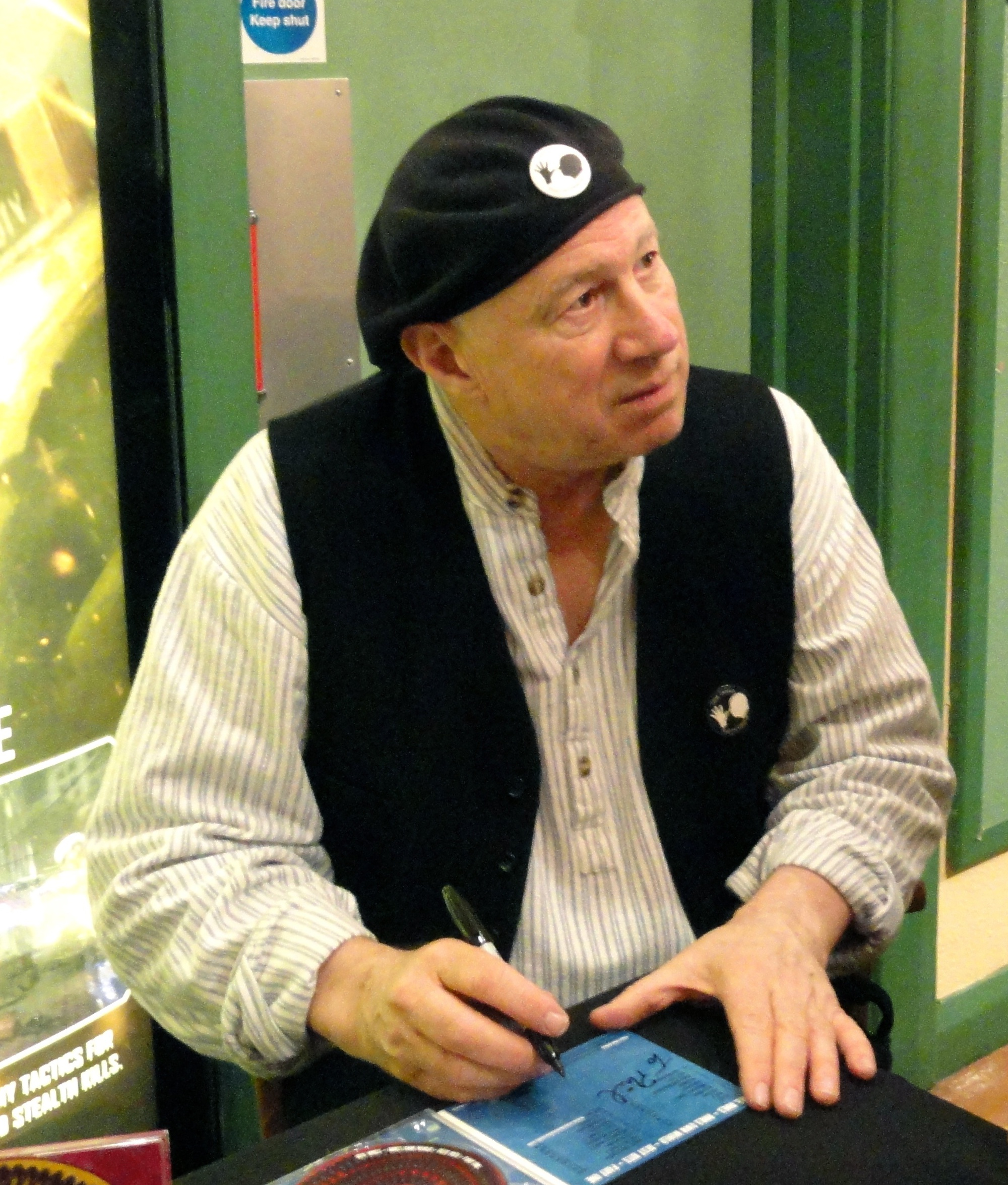
Innes in 2011

During the 1980s, Innes delved into children's entertainment. This new career path began when he took over from Tom Baker as host of Yorkshire TV's The Book Tower for the ITV network. He went on to play the role of the Magician in the live-action children's television series Puddle Lane, also made by Yorkshire Television. He also wrote and voiced the 1980s children's cartoon adventures of The Raggy Dolls, a motley collection of "rejects" from a toy factory. The 65 episodes for Yorkshire Television included the characters Sad Sack, Hi-Fi, Lucy, Dotty, Back-to-Front, Princess and Claude.

He also composed and performed original music and songs for children's television, including Puddle Lane, The Raggy Dolls, The Riddlers and Tumbledown Farm. He brought Monty Python's Terry Jones's book Fairy Tales to television as East of the Moon. He contributed all the stories and music on this production. He was also involved with the popular children's show Tiswas.

Also, during the 1980s, Innes wrote and performed incidental music and songs for the BBC TV series, Jane. Jane was a short-form drama series which was shown nightly in 10-minute segments. The weekly episodes were edited together and broadcast in a 50-minute version on Saturday evening.

=== Reunion concerts ===
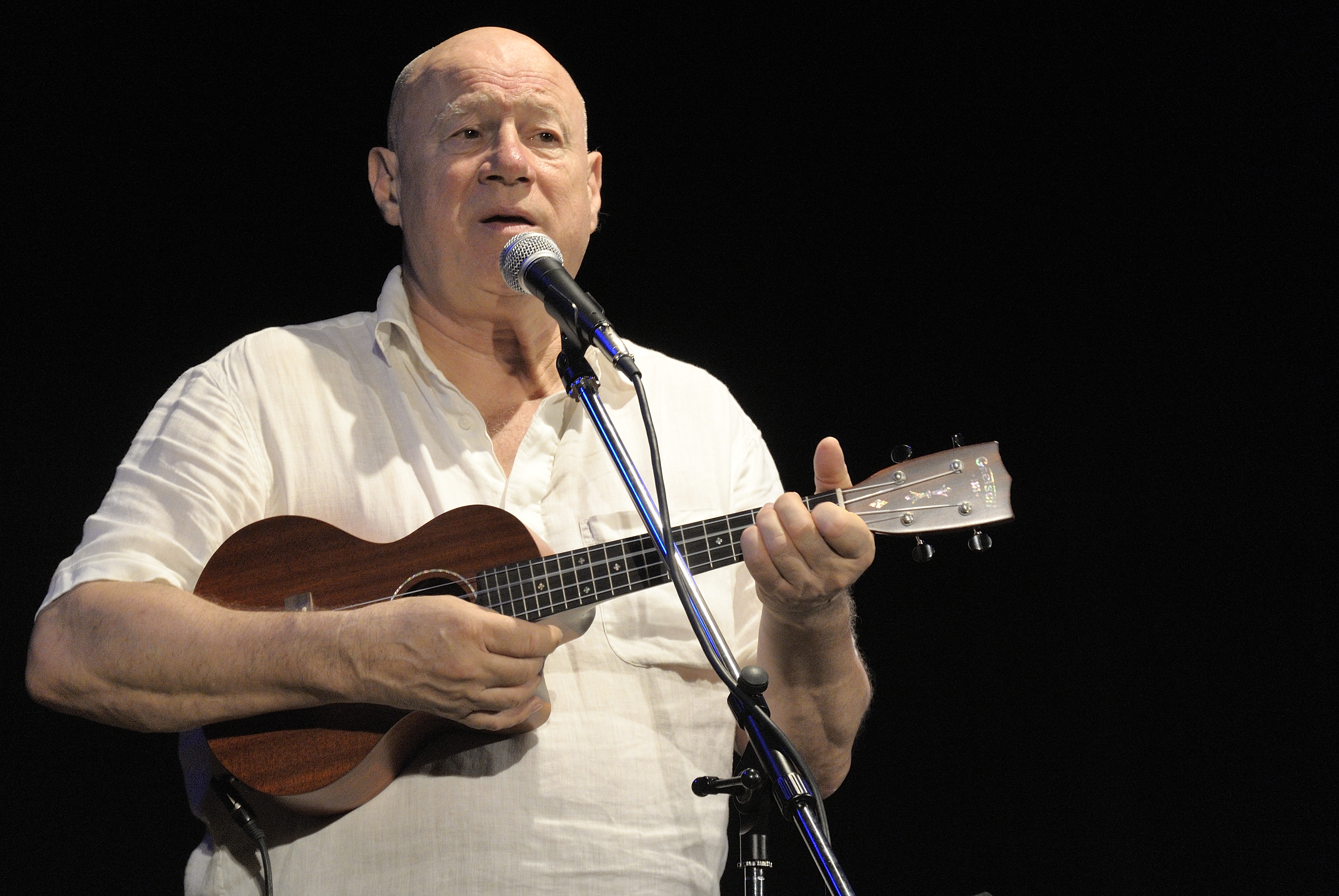
Innes performing in 2014

At the time of The Beatles Anthology CDs, there was a revival of interest in the Rutles and a new album was released in 1996 entitled Archaeology.

In 1998, Innes hosted a 13-episode television series for Anglia Television, called Away with Words, in which he travelled to different areas of Britain to explore the origins of well-known words and phrases.

Innes took part, along with the remaining Monty Python members, in the 2002 Concert for George, in memory of George Harrison.

Innes was occasionally heard (often as the butt of jokes) standing in as the pianist for the BBC Radio 4 panel game I'm Sorry I Haven't a Clue.

Innes toured the UK in 2006 and produced a new Bonzo CD as part of the Bonzo Dog Band's 40th Anniversary tour. In 2008 he undertook the Neil Innes and Fatso 30th Anniversary tour, playing predominantly Rutles numbers with a few Bonzos and Python items.

=== The Idiot Bastard Band ===
In late 2010, Innes announced the formation of the Idiot Bastard Band, a comedy musical collective featuring himself, Adrian Edmondson, Phill Jupitus, Simon Brint and Rowland Rivron. The band debuted, with an 8-week residency, at the Wilmington Arms in Clerkenwell, London in December, playing a range of comedy songs old and new, with deliberately little rehearsal.

New concerts were scheduled in 2011. Jupitus was unable to attend due to prior commitments and was replaced by several special guests, including Paul Whitehouse, Barry Cryer and Nigel Planer. Following the death of Brint, the band performed a further tour in 2012. The band's name is a play on Frank Zappa's song The Idiot Bastard Son.

== Personal life and death ==
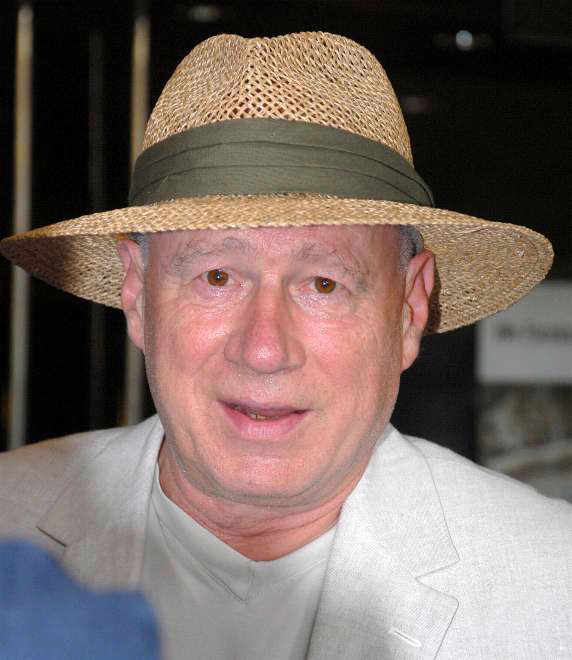
Innes in 2007

While a student at Goldsmiths College, London, in the mid-1960s Innes met Yvonne Catherine Hilton; they married on 3 March 1966. The couple had three sons, Miles (b. 1967), Luke (b. 1971), and Barney (b. 1978).

Innes died of a heart attack on 29 December 2019 at Montcuq, Lot, France, where he had lived for several years. Fellow entertainers, including John Cleese and Stephen Fry, paid tribute to him. The League of Gentlemen star Mark Gatiss also paid tribute to Innes. Comedian Diane Morgan called him "one of the nicest people I've ever met and a towering talent," and director Edgar Wright said he was "forever a fan" of Innes.

Dip My Brain in Joy: A Life With Neil Innes – "The Official Biography" – by his widow Yvonne Innes, was published in 2024.

On 28 November 2024, a one-off concert "A Celebration of the life of Neil Innes: 'How Sweet To Be An Idiot'" was held at the Indigo at The O2 in London, featuring Innes's music played by colleagues and admirers, as well as poetry and comedy. Artists included John Altman, Charlie Dore, Michael Palin and Terry Gilliam, Maddy Prior, Adrian Edmondson, Tom McGuinness, Roger McGough, Yo La Tengo, Terrafolk, Andy Roberts, "Legs" Larry Smith, Luke Innes, Kevin Eldon, Isabella Coulstock, Morgan Fisher, Joe Stilgoe, The Rutles and Emo Philips among others, and the event was hosted by Sanjeev Bhaskar and Martin Lewis. Pre-recorded tributes from Stephen Fry, Aimee Mann and Rick Wakeman were also shown.

== Discography ==
=== Albums ===
- How Sweet to Be an Idiot (1973)
- The Rutland Weekend Songbook (with Eric Idle) (1976)
- Taking Off (1977)
- The Innes Book of Records (1979)
- Off the Record (1982)
- Works in Progress (2005)
- Dogman (A Comedy Musical Story for Children) (with John Dowie & Phill Jupitus) (2005)
- Innes Own World – Best Bits Part One (re-edit of 2003 radio series) (2010)
- Innes Own World – Best Bits Part Two (re-edit of 2003 radio series) (2010)
- Nearly Really (2019)

==== Compilations ====
- Re-Cycled Vinyl Blues (1994)
- Recollections 1 (2000)
- Recollections 2 (2001)
- Recollections 3 (2001)
- Back Catalogue: Silly Songs/Love Songs/Protest Songs/Party Songs (digital compilation series, resequencing of recollections albums) (2010)
- Recollections – Le Duck's Box Set (2013), which included the three CDs, and a bonus DVD containing 16 clips from The Innes Book of Records

==== Live albums ====
- Farewell Posterity Tour (with Fatso, recorded 2008) (2014)

==== Soundtrack appearances ====
- Erik the Viking (1989)

=== Singles ===
Release date	Title	Label and catalogue
1972	"Slush"/"Music from Rawlinson's End"	United Artists UP 35358
1973	"How Sweet to Be an Idiot"/"The Age of Desperation"	United Artists UP 35495
1973	"Momma B"/"Immortal Invisible"	United Artists UP 35639
1974	"Re-cycled Vinyl Blues"/"Fluff on the Needle"	United Artists UP 35676
1974	"Lie Down and Be Counted"/"Bandwagon"	United Artists UP 35745
1975	"What Noise Annoys a Noisy Oyster"/"Oo-Chuck-A-Mao-Mao"	United Artists UP 35772
1977	"Lady Mine"/"Crystal Balls"	Arista ARISTA 106
1977	"Silver Jubilee (A Tribute)"/"Drama on a Saturday Night"	Arista ARISTA 123
1978	"Protest Song"/"The Hard-To-Get"	Warner Brothers K 17182
1979	"Amoeba Boogie"/"Theme"	Polydor POSP 107
1979	"Kenny and Liza"/"Human Race"	Polydor 2059 207
1982	"Them"/"Rock of Ages"	MMC MMC 100
1982	"Mr. Eurovision"/"Ungawa"	MMC MMC 103
1984	"Humanoid Boogie"/"Libido"	PRT 7P 298/12P 298
2009	"Imitation Song"	Neil Innes Music
2014	"Rio" (with the Values)	East Central One/iTunes

=== As band member ===
==== The Bonzo Dog Doo-Dah Band ====
- Gorilla (1967)
- The Doughnut in Granny's Greenhouse (1968)
- Tadpoles (1969)
- Keynsham (1969)
- Let's Make Up and Be Friendly (1972)
- Wrestle Poodles... And Win! (live album) (2006)
- Pour l'Amour des Chiens (2007)

==== The World ====
- Lucky Planet (1970)

==== GRIMMS ====
- Grimms (live album) (1973)
- Rockin' Duck (1973)
- Sleepers (1976)

==== The Rutles ====
- The Rutles (1978)
- Archaeology (1996)
- Live + Raw (live album, recorded 2013) (2014)
- The Wheat Album (demo compilation, recorded 1992) (2018)

== Filmography ==
- Do Not Adjust Your Set (1967–69) as various (also composer)
- Magical Mystery Tour (1967) as himself
- Monty Python (1974, fourth series only) as various (also writer/composer)
- Monty Python and the Holy Grail (1975) as various (also composer)
- Rutland Weekend Television (1975–76) as various (also composer)
- Pleasure at Her Majesty's (1976) as Bob Nylon
- Jabberwocky (1977) as 2nd Herald
- All You Need Is Cash (1978) as Ron Nasty (also composer)
- The Innes Book of Records (1979–1981) as Nick Cabaret/Nobby Normal/Bob Nylon/various (also writer/composer)
- Monty Python's Life of Brian (1979) as A Weedy Samaritan
- Monty Python Live at the Hollywood Bowl (1980) as various (also composer)
- Frankie Howerd Strikes Again (1981) as various (also composer)
- The Missionary (1982) as Gin Palace Singer
- Puddle Lane (1985–89) as Magician (also composer)
- The Raggy Dolls (1986–1994) as Narrator (also writer/composer)
- East of the Moon (1988) as various (also composer)
- Erik the Viking (1989) as Hy-Brasilian (also composer)
- Away with Words (1998) as himself (also writer)
- Concert for George (2002) as Barbershop Singer
- The Rutles 2: Can't Buy Me Lunch (2003) as Ron Nasty (archive footage only, also composer)
- The Bonzo Dog Doo-Dah Band 40th Anniversary Celebration (2006) as himself (also composer)
- The Seventh Python (2008) as himself (also subject)
- Not the Messiah (2009) as Mexican/Mountie

== Bibliography ==
with GRIMMS:

- "Clowns On The Road"
  - published: 3 October 1974 (Paperback)
  - publisher: Methuen Publishing Ltd.

The Raggy Dolls series with Melvyn Jacobsen:

- "Hot Air Balloon" (25 January 1990)
- "Moving House" (25 January 1990)
- "Royal Tour" (25 January 1990)
- "A Trip To The Sea" (25 January 1990)
- "In Days Of Old" (18 October 1990)
- "Stolen Parrot" (18 October 1990)
- "Treehouse" (18 October 1990)
- "We Are Not Amused" (18 October 1990)
- "The Raggy Dolls Activity Book" (30 November 1990)
  - all published in paperback
  - all published by:Boxtree Ltd.

with John Dowie:

- "Dogman: A Comedy Musical Story For Children"
  - published:4 April 2007 ( Audio book with paperback book edition)
  - published by:Laughing Stock Productions Ltd.
    - story by John Dowie, narrated by Phil Jupitus, with songs by Neil innes
