= The Refreshments (Swedish band) =

Swedish rock group

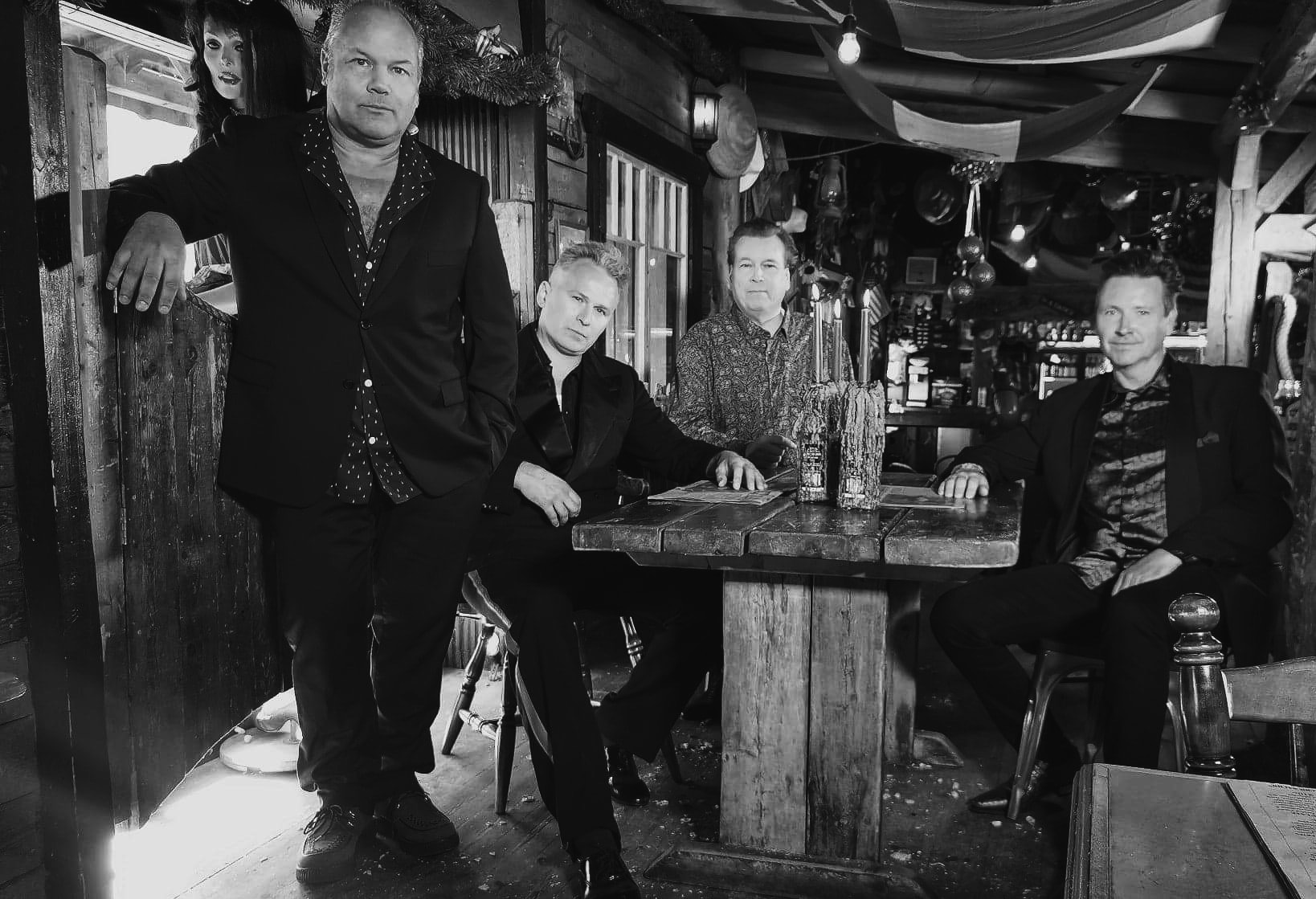
- The Refreshments in 2020

Background information
- Origin: Gävle, Sweden
- Genres: Rock
- Years active: 1989–current
- Labels: Bonnier Music, Darrow Entertainment
- Members: Joakim Arnell-Bass, vocals Mats Forsberg-Drums; Jonas Göransson-Guitar, vocals Johan Blohm-Piano, vocals
- Past members: Tord Eriksson; Niklas Aspholm; Billy Bremner; Robin Olsson; Micke Finell; Thomas "Flash" Holmberg
- Website: http://www.therefreshments.se/

The Refreshments are a Swedish rock band formed in 1989 in Gävle.

They initially played mainly covers of 1950s rock and roll songs. They originally started playing as "The King-Cats," but changed their name to The Refreshments in 1991. Their 1995 first album, Both Rock'n'Roll, was followed by 1997's Trouble Boys. Both albums were produced by Billy Bremner, who also played in the band for a few years.

Eleven of the band's fourteen original songs (as of 2011) have been written by bass player Joakim Arnell. Since piano player Johan Blohm joined the band, they have also played an occasional country song. Two of their biggest hits are "Miss You Miss Belinda" and "One Dance, One Rose, One Kiss". The band's 2003 album Rock'n'Roll X-mas placed number 1 on the Swedish music chart.

The Refreshments have also worked with Dave Edmunds, a collaboration that resulted in the live album A Pile of Rock. In addition, the band has featured the legendary British guitarist Albert Lee.

== Discography ==
=== Albums ===
- 1995: Both Rock'n'Roll
- 1997: Trouble Boys
- 1999: Are You Ready
- 2000: Musical Fun for Everyone
- 2001: Real Songs on Real Instruments
- 2001: Here We Are - Best of The Refreshments
- 2003: On the Rocks
- 2003: Rock'n'Roll X-Mas
- 2004: Easy to Pickup Hard to Put Down
- 2006: 24-7
- 2006: It's Gotta Be Both Rock and Roll
- 2007 Rock On
- 2007 Christmas Spirits
- 2008: Jukebox - Refreshing Classics
- 2009: A Band's Gotta Do What A Band's Gotta Do
- 2009 Rarities
- 2011: Ridin' Along with the Refreshments
- 2012: Highways and Biways
- 2013: Let It Rock - The Chuck Berry Tribute
- 2014: Wow Factor
- 2016: Straight Up
- 2019: Real Rock 'n' Roll

With other artists:

- 1997: A Pile of Rock - Live (backup band for Dave Edmunds)
- 2001: Brit Rock - Back On Track (backup band for Dave Edmunds, Steve Gibbons, Billy Bremner and Mickey Jupp)

=== Singles ===
- 2014: "Hallelujah"

== Movies ==
- 2004 One Night with the Refreshments Live in Concert
- 2005 The Refreshments Live
