= John Altman (composer) =

British film composer

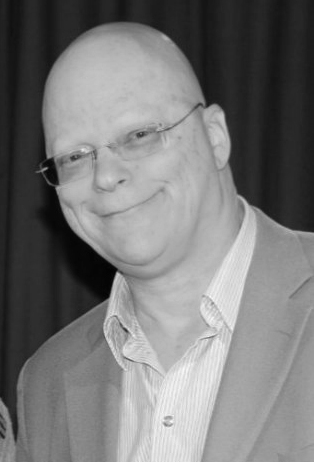
- Altman on set of the short film Pass:on, 2009

Background information
- Born: 5 December 1949 (age 76); London, England
- Occupations: Film composer; music arranger; orchestrator; conductor
- Years active: 1955–present 1973–1999, 2005–present

John Altman (born 5 December 1949) is an English film composer, music arranger, orchestrator and conductor.

== Music career ==
Altman was introduced to the music of the 1930s and 1940s at an early age by his uncles, bandleaders Woolf and Sid Phillips. Woolf Phillips was the bandleader and MC at the London Palladium during the Golden Age of Variety and arranged and conducted for Judy Garland, the Marx Brothers, Frank Sinatra, Nat King Cole, Duke Ellington, Benny Goodman, Danny Kaye and Dean Martin, among others, while Sid Phillips wrote for the Bert Ambrose Orchestra, played in Louis Armstrong's British All Stars, and led Britain's best known Dixieland Band. John Altman's cousin, Simon Phillips, was for many years the drummer of the world-famous rock band Toto and now leads the Grammy nominated Protocol.

Altman's only formal musical training was piano lessons as a child. While enrolled at the University of Sussex he was involved in session work and gigs with Peter Green, members of Fleetwood Mac, Kevin Ayers, and John Martyn. His later studies at Birkbeck College were interrupted when he left to work with Hot Chocolate as musical director for their concert tour for two years. He also played saxophone with such artists as Jimi Hendrix, Bob Marley, Eric Clapton, Phil Collins, Little Richard, and Van Morrison for whom he functioned as arranger and musical director as well as reed player. Among the many other artists Altman has played with over the years are Muddy Waters, Nick Drake, Jimmy Page, the Comets, Spencer Davis. In the mid-1970s, Altman began arranging and conducting. Among his hit records have been Aled Jones' Walking in the Air (which he also produced); Alison Moyet's That Old Devil Called Love, Simple Minds' Street Fighting Years (1989), Rod Stewart's "Downtown Train", George Michael's "Kissing a Fool", Prefab Sprout's Hey Manhattan, Tina Turner and Barry White's Wildest Dream, Diana Ross' Christmas Album, Björk's It's Oh So Quiet, Goldie's Saturnz Return. He was musical director for the All-Star Band assembled for the 1981 Amnesty International benefit show The Secret Policeman's Other Ball – an ensemble that included Sting, Eric Clapton, Jeff Beck, Phil Collins, Bob Geldof, Donovan and Midge Ure.

Altman is a highly accomplished jazz musician, lauded by respected critic Don Heckman in the Los Angeles Times as "one of the few film composers with authentic jazz skills." In the jazz world he has performed with Chet Baker, Plas Johnson, Ernie Watts, Red Holloway, Conte Candoli, Slim Gaillard, Barbara Morrison, Herb Geller, Wild Bill Davison, Bud Freeman, Les McCann, Percy Heath and many others. He conducted the Stan Tracey Big Band and the Durham Cathedral Choir for an album of Duke Ellington's Sacred Music. His jazz quartet CD You Started Something was released in January 2006 on the Bronze Jazz label, of which he was A&R Director, and was named 'Jazz CD of the Month' in The Observer. His previous CD (featuring his orchestra with jazz singer Joan Viskant) also received this accolade. The John Altman Big Band frequently performs in the US and UK. Personnel includes Wayne Bergeron, Andy Martin, Pete Christlieb, Grant Geissman, Gary Foster, Warren Luening, Peter Erskine, Alex Acuna, and Tom Ranier. Altman performed at the Vladivostok Summer Festival, the San Jose winter jazz series, the LA Jazz Festival, the Hollywood and Highland Summer Jazz Series in Los Angeles and the London Jazz Festival both with the big band, which garnered a standing ovation and rave reviews, and the Caribbean Jazz Cruise. He is also a Patron of the National Jazz Archive and was honoured by the Archive in July 2010. He recently recorded the big band for an album to be released in the New Year of 2022. Altman also undertook a well received big band tour of Australia, and a quintet tour of California. His latest jazz project is a quartet, Pearls of Wisdom, with Police guitarist Andy Summers which debuted in 2014.

Altman is a frequent guest conductor for the Royal Philharmonic Orchestra, and served on the board of ASMAC (the American Society of Music Arrangers and Composers), and as a member of the governing Council of the British Academy of Film and Television Arts (BAFTA). His recent record arrangements are for the Amnesty International 50th anniversary celebrations CD, Chimes of Freedom – one featuring Pete Seeger in his final recording, with banjo virtuoso Bela Fleck, and the other a jazz track featuring Evan Rachel Wood with Patrice Rushen and Tom Scott. He was flattered to have been recommended for this prestigious gig by Sir George Martin. He also arranged the horn section for Mark Ronson's song "Johanna" featured in the movie Mortdecai performed by Miles Kane and several songs for the Michael Caine Gala at the Royal Albert Hall for Joss Stone, Quincy Jones, and the London Symphony Orchestra

He contributed songs for a stage musical devised by Terence Frisby from his best selling book Kisses on a Postcard. He was also co-founder – and co-host for seven years – of the "10 Room" Monday night jam session in London which won Club Night of the Year awards – and featured guests such as: Pharrell Williams, Lionel Richie, Macy Gray, Will Smith, Black Eyed Peas, Alicia Keys, Najee, Wyclef Jean, Shaquille O'Neal, the Roots, the Neptunes, Mario, Roy Ayers, Omar, Chaka Khan, Chris Tucker and the Backstreet Boys, as well as helping to launch the careers of John Legend, Katie Melua, Gabriella Cilmi, and Amy Winehouse, who was a regular 10 Room habitué and performer. Two new venues in London have continued to host the weekly sessions with guests over the years including Prince and the New Power Generation and Jessie J, and others are to be added worldwide. One of the backing vocalists was Oscar nominee Cynthia Erivo. In August 2018 he guested with the New Power Generation and Beverley Knight at their London tribute to Prince.

== Film score composing ==
He has had a parallel successful career as a composer/arranger/producer for films and television, winning most of the film composer awards -an EMMY and an ASCAP Film Award for RKO 281 – The Making of Citizen Kane, the Anthony Asquith Award (BAFTA) for Hear My Song, a TRIC Award for Peak Practice, a Golden Reel nomination for Little Voice, a BAFTA nomination for The Old Devils, an Oscar mention for the period music for James Cameron's Titanic, which he also produced, and a second Emmy nomination in 2003 for his score for The Roman Spring of Mrs Stone starring Helen Mirren and Anne Bancroft. His contribution to British and international film music has been recognised in October 2006 by the award of the prestigious Gold Badge of Excellence, the lifetime achievement award of the British Academy of Composers and Songwriters, in 2011 with a Lifetime Achievement Award at the Monaco Film Festival, and in 2012 with an honorary doctorate of music from the University of Sussex where he was the first ever Creative Arts Fellow in the Department of Humanities, a position he held through 2010. In 2018 he was awarded a star on the Palace Pier in the Brighton Music Walk of Fame. His autobiography Hidden Man - My Many Musical Lives was published in February 2022 by Equinox Books

His credits as a film score composer include Funny Bones, Beautiful Thing, The MatchMaker, Legionnaire, Hope Springs, Aakasha Gopuram, Bhaji on the Beach, Bad Behaviour, Fidel, King of Texas, Beautiful Joe, On Thin Ice and The Lost Empire. He also scored the tank chase sequence in the James Bond film GoldenEye and arranged and produced the Academy Award-nominated period music for James Cameron's film Titanic. In 2020 he arranged and conducted some of the Hans Zimmer score for the James Bond film No Time to Die.

Altman's screen career began as the musical arranger/director for the 1978 film Just a Gigolo. In 1978, he arranged the song "Always Look on the Bright Side of Life" for the film Monty Python's Life of Brian. His association with Monty Python had started when he appeared on the album Matching Tie and Handkerchief, and continued when he arranged the music for the Rutles television special All You Need Is Cash created by Eric Idle and Neil Innes. He orchestrated and conducted the soundtrack album for the Rutles film and fulfilled the same role on the Rutles 1996 album Archaeology. Altman arranged and conducted the music for the three BBC TV series of The Innes Book of Records starring Rutles/Python composer Neil Innes and has made multiple related onstage appearances with Innes and the Pythons. He continued in this capacity for numerous film and television productions, including Shadowlands, the score for The Sheltering Sky (Golden Globe - Best score) Léon (The Professional) and Miss Marple. He was the first Western composer to score a Russian film (Tsareubiytsa, aka The Assassin of the Tsar). Other credits include the top 5 worldwide hit movie Shall We Dance? starring Jennifer Lopez, Richard Gere and Susan Sarandon for Miramax, for which he won the ASCAP Film Award; the music for the CBS movie Suburban Madness with Sela Ward, and the controversial Emmy nominated miniseries, The Reagans starring Judy Davis and James Brolin. In the UK he scored Mr Harvey Lights a Candle for BBC Films, and the BAFTA nominated The Queen's Sister for Channel 4.

He has also become a guest presenter on the BBC Television Culture Show and Channel 4's The Music of James Bond, and was seen extensively in the BBC4 documentary How Pop Songs Work, as well as frequent radio appearances as guest presenter of various jazz shows. A recent TV project was as musical director for the BBC TV 'celebration' of the centenary of Titanic. He has also written the sleeve notes for the album he produced of unreleased material for a double and quadruple CD special edition box set of music from the James Cameron movie Titanic, issued at the time of the release of Titanic 3D, in April 2012. In July 2015 he was commissioned to compose a new score for the Gala screening of the restored silent classic Shooting Stars which premiered in the 2015 London Film Festival. In 2018 he re-arranged Quincy Jones iconic score for the 1969 movie The Italian Job for live projection with orchestra. He has recently begun hosting a series of live conversations in London with friends and colleagues. Thus far his guests have included Sanjeev Bhaskar, Michael Palin, and Goldie with Rob Brydon, Jim Carter, Imelda Staunton, Lenny Henry, Adrian Dunbar, and Bradley Walsh. In 2023 he arranged all the period music for the movie Shoshana directed by Michael Winterbottom

== Commercial music composing ==
Altman is the prolific writer of music for commercials, having scored more than 4,000 TV advertisements. He won every major creative award, including the inaugural MPA Music in Advertising Award, and being named by Campaign magazine in 2002 as one of the 100 most influential figures in contemporary British advertising, and in 2005 as one of the 5 top composers. The track he wrote for the hardware chain B & Q ran for many years while his music for Levi's and Renault won the Campaign Award for Best Soundtracks in 2003 and 2004. Since 2020, his 2006 track Jazz in 3 has been the theme song for Boar's Head displays in supermarkets across the US.

Among his well-known collaborators in advertising have been such as David Bailey, Terence Donovan, John Frankenheimer, Tony Scott, and Sir Salman Rushdie. He is also a prolific composer of library music, with his work being featured worldwide in movies and on television, in productions such as Peaky Blinders, America in Colour and Dancing With The Stars.

== Personal life ==
John is a father and lives with wife in London.
