= Rutland Weekend Television =

British sketch show by Eric Idle (1975–76)

- Genre: Sketch comedy
- Created by: Eric Idle
- Written by: Eric Idle
- Directed by: Andrew Gosling; Steve Roberts
- Starring: Eric Idle; Neil Innes; David Battley; Henry Woolf; Terence Bayler; Gwen Taylor
- Music by: Neil Innes
- Country of origin: United Kingdom
- No. of series: 2
- No. of episodes: 14

Production
- Producer: Ian Kiell
- Running time: approx. 30 minutes

Original release
- Network: BBC2
- Release: 12 May 1975 – 24 December 1976

Related
- The Rutles

Rutland Weekend Television (RWT) is a television sketch show written by Eric Idle with music by Neil Innes. Two series were broadcast on BBC2, the first consisting of six episodes in 1975, and the second series of seven episodes in 1976. A Christmas special was broadcast on Boxing Day 1975.

It was Idle's first television project after Monty Python's Flying Circus, which had ended the previous year, and it was the catalyst for The Rutles. Rutland Weekend Television ostensibly centred on "Britain's smallest television network", situated in England's smallest (and mainly rural) county, Rutland. Rutland had been abolished as a county in April 1974 so, supposedly, there were tax advantages to broadcasting from somewhere that did not legally exist. This framework allowed for a range of sketches and material to be presented, all as part of the fictional network's hosted programming. Nevertheless, even this very loose concept was frequently ignored, and material was presented with a more stream-of-consciousness approach, with no particular tie-in to the RWT framework. Typically, in addition to sketch material, each episode also featured two music videos (a term not yet coined in 1975) of Neil Innes songs, which were woven into the flow of the show.

The show's title alludes to London Weekend Television. A Rutland television station would be pretty small (representing roughly 30,000 people in an area less than 150 square miles), so a Rutland Weekend Television would have to be ridiculously tiny. The joke was doubly meaningful as Idle had to work with the very limited budget of the BBC Presentation department instead of the more lavish budgets associated with light entertainment – so the weekly patter about their inability to buy props and sets reflected reality. Indeed, the last show of the first series featured Idle and Innes, stripped and shivering in blankets under a bare bulb, singing about how the power was about to be cut off. Idle spoke bitterly about these conditions years later but his attempts to overcome them formed the basis of a lot of the show's jokes.

Idle, in a 1975 Radio Times interview, remarked, "It was made on a shoestring budget, and someone else was wearing the shoe. The studio is the same size as the weather forecast studio and nearly as good. We had to bring the sets up four floors for each scene, then take them down again. While the next set was coming up, we'd change our make-up. Every minute mattered. It's not always funny to be funny from ten in the morning until ten at night. As for ad-libbing, what ad-libbing? You don't ad-lib when you're working with three cameras and anyway the material goes out months after you've made it."

== A typical episode ==
The episode begins with the in-vision announcer, usually with something going wrong or with something unusual, from announcements catching fire to open auditions for the announcer itself. Occasionally the announcement was sung or performed by more than one person. In one episode, the announcements are performed by "The Ricochet Brothers" (spelled Ricochet but pronounced Rick-ot-chet) who begin the episode as a pair, and expand to a full cast, each group speaking the announcement in unison.

The role of the announcer was to announce the "programmes" (typically sketches) – many programmes would lead into, or announce, one of many songs and accompanying strange vignettes by Neil Innes. Innes recalled that the cheaper-looking sets added to the show; "It was sometimes a problem but that was in fact the whole raison d'etre of the programme. It was such a cheap budget programme that it worked in our favour. You could actually show how cheap and cheerful it was because it was Rutland Weekend Television. It was made in a studio at the BBC called Presentation B, which is where they do the weather from."

== Cast and guest stars ==
=== Regular cast ===
- Eric Idle - As the star of the show, Idle plays many of the lead roles in the series. He is also the first person to appear in the show, as an interviewer in the first sketch, "Gibberish", in which Idle and Woolf talk in completely nonsensical sentences:

Ham sandwich, bucket and water plastic Duralex rubber McFisheries underwear. Plugged rabbit emulsion, zinc custard without sustenance in kipling-duff geriatric scenery, maximises press insulating government grunting sapphire-clubs incidentally. But tonight, sam pan Bombay Bermuda in diphtheria rustic McAlpine splendour, rabbit and foot-foot-phooey jugs rapidly big biro ruveliners musk-green gauges micturate with nipples and tiptoe rusting machinery, rustically inclined. Good evening and welcome.

- Neil Innes - A former member of the Bonzo Dog Doo Dah Band and The World, longtime songwriter for and performer with Monty Python, then current member of Grimms, and later to lead The Rutles, Innes wrote and performed most of the songs in the show, often in the guise of another character, such as Stoop Solo. Innes and members of his band, Fatso, also performed many songs written or co-written by Idle during the tenure of the show. Aside from the musical items, Innes was also a regular cast member, performing in many of the sketches.
- David Battley - Known for his performances as the schoolteacher Mr. Turkentine in Willy Wonka & the Chocolate Factory (1971) and the hapless Ergo in Krull (1983). In the show, he was often the straight man, and second only to Idle in the number of his performances throughout the series. He was the Paul McCartney character in the original (RWT) Rutles sketch, but was not involved in the TV special All You Need Is Cash (1978). Battley also appears in the final episode as David Frost, whom he had also portrayed in a stage production.
- Henry Woolf - Often paired with Battley, appearing at his side in many sketches, though occasionally complains about being cast as "the short one", or "The Jewish One". He later starred as the Surrey mystic, Arthur Sultan, in All You Need Is Cash. In the fourth episode of series two, Woolf bitterly complains that "I'm a writer—I've had plays on!" Both claims are true.
- Gwen Taylor - As the main female performer, Taylor appeared in a lot of sketches, but is still much more noticeably absent than Idle or Battley. She frequently plays genuine female characters, instead of the more "decorative" roles from the other female contributors. She too starred in All You Need Is Cash as the mother of Leggy Mountbatten and Ron Nasty's wife, Chastity; as well as appearing in Palin and Jones's Ripping Yarns and in several roles in Monty Python's Life of Brian (1979), including Mrs. Bignose, the elderly woman bent double under the weight of a dummy donkey and the ineffectual heckler during Pilate's passover address. It could be said that she was an official "new" fringe member of Monty Python around this time, alongside Charles McKeown and Terence Bayler, frequently appearing in its creators' projects.
- Terence Bayler - Appearing from the last episode of series one onwards, Bayler played a variety of characters, including a shy and apparently forgetful announcer, the greasy presenter of "Rutland Showtime", and the Pink Panzer (a pink-uniformed SS officer who greets the camera with an effete Nazi salute and a breathless "Heil Hitler"). He later appeared as the manager of the Rutles in All You Need Is Cash, and as Gregory ("I'm Brian and so's my wife!") in Monty Python's Life of Brian (1979).

=== Guest stars ===
- Bunny May, Lyn Ashley, Carinthia West - Three performers who were given the more "token" roles, often playing attractive, silent characters, in sharp contrast to the well rounded performances of Gwen Taylor. May was not in fact an actress but an actor who occasionally appeared in drag. Ashley was Eric Idle's wife at the time (they divorced between the show's two series). West, romantically associated with Mick Jagger & Bryan Ferry at various points in her life, increasingly provided the glamour over the two series.
- Fatso - The band featured regularly, both as a group and as individuals. Members included Innes himself, as well as John Halsey, Billy Bremner, Brian Hodgson, and Roger Rettig. Halsey played Ringo Starr facsimile Barry Wom in Idle and Innes' Beatles parody, The Rutles, which originated as a sketch on RWT (Innes and Idle portrayed the Lennon and McCartney parallels, Ron Nasty and Dirk McQuickly). He also appeared as one half of the "Fabulous Bingo Brothers" (the other half being musician Zoot Money), and as the defence lawyer in the "Rutland 5–0" sketch. Roger Rettig later resided in Florida, United States. In England, Rettig backed Lonnie Donegan and Roy St. John, as well as participating in the band Klondike Pete and the Huskies. Brian Hodgson, regularly tours with guitarist Albert Lee in a band called Hogan's Heroes. Billy Bremner is one of the UK's top session guitarists who now resides in Sweden. He was also a member of Rockpile fronted by Dave Edmunds. Also in the Rockpile band was Nick Lowe. Billy released a solo single on Stiff Records in 1981 called Loud Music in Cars.
- George Harrison - The Christmas special features George Harrison as "Pirate Bob", dressed in appropriate attire and frequently interrupting the action throughout the show, before being given the chance to sing at the end in normal clothing. After leading the band through an intro to his 1970–71 hit "My Sweet Lord", Harrison switches off and starts singing a lively tune about pirates known as "The Pirate Song", co-written with Eric Idle. Innes's connection with Harrison and the other The Beatles, as well as Harrison's to Monty Python and its members, are equally notable. Innes' Bonzo Dog Doo-Dah Band appeared in The Beatles' Magical Mystery Tour film, and Paul McCartney produced the Bonzos' 1968 single "I'm the Urban Spaceman", while Harrison founded HandMade Films for the purpose of financing Python's Life of Brian; HandMade later also produced Python alumnus Terry Gilliam's Time Bandits. In addition, Harrison appeared as a news reporter – interviewing Michael Palin – in Idle and Innes' 1978 Beatles parody, The Rutles: All You Need is Cash.
- Wanda Ventham appeared in two episodes of the first season. Like Gwen Taylor, she assayed the female roles in sketches where one of the male cast in drag would be inappropriate. Her most memorable appearance was in episode five as a television presenter who interrupted by her boyfriend Frank (Battley) proposing to her on air and their relationship becomes a running gag throughout the episode.

Idle said of his RWT colleagues (in the same Radio Times interview): "Neil Innes is superb. I must be his biggest fan. Henry Woolf played Toulouse-Lautrec in the West End. He's the best small philosopher in London at the moment. And David Battley – what can I say? Straight, pale, dead-pan brilliant. Our cameraman, Peter Bartlett, filmed the Queen but says I'm easier to work with."

== Memorable sketches ==
- Santa Doesn't Live Here Any More. Supposedly a play by Arthur Serious, this sketch parodies a typically miserable family Christmas, with David Battley complaining about everything and suggesting "a nice game of suicide". Eric Idle relates a charming childhood memory that quickly turns nasty, and Neil Innes arrives as a postman, with an unusual present in the shape of a sexy showgirl, prompting Battley's remark "they make lovely presents, women". This segues into Innes's doleful song, "I Don't Believe in Santa Any More".
- Being Normal. A spoof documentary about one man's completely uneventful life. Despite having had lunatic parents and a miserable childhood, Arthur Sutcliffe (David Battley) remains depressingly ordinary, going to "straight pubs" and feeling at home in the company of "other normals". The documentary's narrator decides that "the little man from the off-licence" (Woolf) is to blame, not just for Sutcliffe's misfortune, but for everything, including Leicester City Football Club's failure to win the FA Cup, racial prejudice and the unequal distribution of wealth, which turns out to have been true. This segues into Innes's song Lie Down and Be Counted.
- Expose. What begins as an investigation into the notorious 'Massed Flashers of Reigate' is quickly overtaken by the revelation that the police force are moonlighting as shop assistants and builders, and a commune for policemen (and women) is raided by hippies looking for drugs. The documentary also highlights how few people believe in Sir Keith Joseph, before Eric Idle is informed that he's getting a bad review. Idle rants about the uselessness of television critics for a while, but Henry Woolf informs him that his satirical invective has won him a rave review. Idle changes tack and begins praising TV critics, but the cast rebel against him and talk about putting in for their own series as the credits roll.
- The Cretin Club. A man (David Battley) is despondent after he scores zero in an IQ test, but since he managed to get his name right at the top of the paper, the examiner (Eric Idle) gives him two points and membership to the Cretin Club, whose perks include cufflinks, a club tie and an "I Am A Cretin" T-shirt. (This sketch was expanded upon in The Rutland Dirty Weekend Book.)
- Ill Health Food Store. Eric Idle runs a shop selling both unappetising fare such as tins of acne, the 'diarrhoea delight'- and the chance to take a vegetarian home and force-feed him meat.
- Twenty-four Hours In Tunbridge Wells. An extremely low-budget spoof of the Gene Kelly / Frank Sinatra film On the Town, shown as part of Rutland Weekend Television's season of Classically Bad American Films.
- Ron Badger / Satan's Electrical Shop. The Devil (David Battley) is found in reduced circumstances, running a small electrical shop. He complains that people's souls are no good to him ("they just sit there, soulfully...if people sold me their privates, it'd be more interesting") but reluctantly decides to buy just one more. The customer (Eric Idle) has not taken Satan's economic downturn into account though, and the promise to make love to Helen of Troy turns out to be a seedy one-night stand with "Helen of bleeding Edgbaston, more like" in a grubby seaside hotel room.
- Man Alive – Suburban Prisons. A spoof of the BBC current events series has housewives running maximum security prisons from their bungalows. Mrs Harris's prison is the most unpopular, as she has reintroduced hanging. However, Mrs Fletcher's prison is a big hit, because she had Johnny Cash (Neil Innes) perform a concert for the inmates.
- The Old Gay Whistle Test. A parody of The Old Grey Whistle Test, featuring Idle as the host, speaking in a permanent whisper (parodying the real show's host "Whispering" Bob Harris). It featured Stan Fitch, "the world's first all-dead singer", and supposed rock star Mantra Robinson talking about a concert where "we did over seven million dollars' worth of damage, so it was rather good", even though only five people turned up.

=== The Rutles ===
One show introduced The Rutles, a four-piece band fronted by Innes as a man "suffering from love song" spoofing The Beatles, singing "I Must Be in Love", a pastiche of some of the early Lennon–McCartney songs. This was followed by the beginnings of a documentary feature about the band, cut short when the camera, mounted on a car, speeds off. This scene was shown in the United States on Saturday Night Live and was later remade in the spinoff film, All You Need Is Cash, featuring Idle, Innes, Ricky Fataar and John Halsey (who also appeared in many of the musical items in the series) as the "Pre-Fab Four". Innes wrote the music for the film, most of which was parody of well-known Beatles songs.

On RWT, "The Rutles" are portrayed by: Eric Idle as the Harrison character, Neil Innes as the Lennon character, David Battley as the McCartney character, and John Halsey as the Ringo character. They are introduced as: "Dirk" (Idle), "Nasty" (Innes), "Stig" (Battley), & "Barry" (Halsey). ("Barry" is inexplicably changed to "Kevin" on the RWT soundtrack album.) The original version of "I Must Be in Love", is performed by Neil Innes & Fatso, and is slightly different from the 1978 All You Need Is Cash version. Also of note, on RWT, "The Rutles" are quite clearly a product of Rutland, whereas in All You Need Is Cash, they are relocated to Liverpool.

Innes later appeared in another sketch, as "Ron Lennon", performing a short song titled "The Children of Rock-N-Roll". This 30-second piece was later expanded into a full Rutles song, "Good Times Roll", for the All You Need Is Cash film and album.

== Python influence ==
Aside from the first appearance of the Rutles, the show features some surreal humour in the style associated with Monty Python. One sketch features the Lone Ranger (Idle) transformed into the Lone Accountant, with Innes as Tonto accidentally murdering holdup victims while trying to rescue them ("too many gin-and-tonic at lunch... You think it easy to be Indian and accountant?"). Another scene features Gwen Taylor visiting the doctor to complain of her constantly changing costume and surroundings and being diagnosed with "bad continuity". The prescribed treatment is editing out two weeks of her life, after which she says she feels well, and a bit hungry... though her soundtrack is still off. She then becomes a victim of recurring film flashbacks, eventually disappearing back into her childhood.

Innes subsequently created and starred in The Innes Book of Records, a pre-MTV show that wove together strange guests and music videos in a bewildering array of musical styles and visual styles.

The premise of Rutland Weekend Television is superficially similar to that of the Canadian comedy series Second City Television (SCTV), as both are comedic shows about a small independent low-budget TV network. However, the shows were created independently around the same time in 1975 and 1976, and neither show had been seen by the creators of the other at the time of their initial airings—and indeed, for years after.

== Other media ==
As well as providing the basis for The Rutles, Rutland Weekend Television also spawned its own LP and book.

=== Book ===
The Rutland Dirty Weekend Book by Eric Idle, 1976

A dense and lavishly illustrated parody of the Television, films and print media of the mid-1970s.

The book has an issue of "Rutland Stone" bound inside. The back page of this issue carries a full-page advertisement for The Rutles' latest album ("Finchley Road"), a single ("Ticket To Rut"), and an assortment of Rutles merchandise. The book also contains the "Vatican Sex Manual" featuring pictures of Eric Idle in various positions in which it is impossible to have sex.

=== DVD ===
Despite many requests, none of the episodes have been released on DVD – the show has complicated rights issues, belonging in principle both to the BBC and Idle. Innes claimed that Idle has no interest in seeing the series released, as it reminds him of an unhappy time in his life. In 2021 Idle was hopeful of a release but had little time to dedicate to the project.
