= Bloodletting (Boxer album) =

- Cover by Tony Wright

Studio album by Boxer
- Released: 1979
- Recorded: 1976
- Genre: Rock
- Length: 35:39
- Label: Virgin, EMI
- Producer: Mike Patto and Nigel Thomas

Boxer chronology
Absolutely (1977)	Bloodletting (1979)

Bloodletting is the third and final studio album by the rock band Boxer, released on the Virgin record label in 1979. Their third album in order of release, it had in fact been recorded in 1976 after their debut Below the Belt. It was also a posthumous release for band leader Mike Patto, who had died of lymphatic leukemia in March 1979, and for bass player Keith Ellis, who had died December 1978. Patto was credited as writer of all the album's original songs. Also featured were cover versions of "Hey Bulldog" by Lennon and McCartney, Leonard Cohen's "Teachers", "Dinah Low" by Terry Stamp and Jim Avery (who also wrote "Town Drunk" on Boxer's debut album, Below The Belt) and "The Loner" by Neil Young. The cover artwork was by Tony Wright.

Bloodletting was released on CD in 2000 by EMI.

== Track listing ==
1. "Hey Bulldog" (John Lennon, Paul McCartney)
2. "The Blizzard" (Mike Patto)
3. "Rich Man's Daughter" (Patto)
4. "Big City Fever" (Patto)
5. "The Loner" (Neil Young)
6. "Why Pick on Me" (Patto)
7. "Love Has Got Me" (Patto)
8. "Dinah-Low" (Terry Stamp, Jim Avery)
9. "Teachers" (Leonard Cohen)

== Personnel ==
=== Boxer ===
- Mike Patto – lead vocals
- Ollie Halsall – guitar
- Keith Ellis – bass
- Tony Newman – drums

=== Additional Personnel ===
- Bobby Tench – guitar, backing vocals
- Tim Hinkley – keyboards
- Chris Stainton – keyboards
- Boz Burrell – bass, backing vocals

== Single ==
- "Hey Bulldog"/"Loony Ali" Virgin 9509 (1978) US/Europe release
