= The Rutles (album) =

Soundtrack album by the Rutles
- Released: March 1978
- Genres: Pop rock; comedy rock; psychedelic pop; rock and roll
- Length: 36:13
- Label: Warner Bros.

The Rutles chronology
The Rutles (1978)	The Rutles Archaeology (1996)

Neil Innes chronology
Taking Off (1977)	The Rutles (1978)	The Innes Book of Records (1979)

Alternative cover
- The cover to the American CD reissue of The Rutles. From left to right: Eric Idle, John Halsey, Ricky Fataar, and Neil Innes.

Professional ratings
Review scores
Source	Rating
AllMusic	4.5/5 stars
Christgau's Record Guide	C

The Rutles (alternately titled Meet The Rutles) is a soundtrack album to the 1978 telemovie All You Need Is Cash. The album contains 14 of the tongue-in-cheek pastiches of Beatles songs that were featured in the film.

The primary creative force of the Rutles' music was Neil Innes, the sole composer and arranger of the songs. In the late 1960s, Innes had been the "seventh" member of Monty Python as well as one of the main artists behind the Bonzo Dog Doo Dah Band, who had been featured in the real Beatles' Magical Mystery Tour film performing "Death Cab for Cutie".

Innes credits the three musicians he recruited to assist him on the project as having been important in helping him capture the feel of the Beatles. Guitarist/singer Ollie Halsall and drummer John Halsey had played together in the groups Timebox and Patto. Multi-instrumentalist Ricky Fataar had played with the Flames before joining the Beach Boys in the early 1970s.

Eric Idle, who devised the Rutles concept and co-wrote the film, did not play or sing on any of the recordings; he offered to help, but had recently had an appendectomy, so he was encouraged to recuperate instead. George Harrison, having encouraged Idle and Innes to make a film that satirised the Beatles' history, and lent them archival footage for inclusion in the film, facilitated the album's release by introducing them to the chairman of Warner Bros. Records, Mo Ostin.

The pastiches mimic the Beatles' sound to the degree that a 1978 Beatles bootleg, Indian Rope Trick, included the Rutles' "Cheese and Onions", attributing it to John Lennon. In the early 1980s, Innes was accused by one American Beatle fan of stealing unreleased Beatles tracks to use in the film; this was based on a recording of "Cheese and Onions" obtained by the fan which he believed to be by John Lennon. When the recording was played to Innes, he was amused to discover that it was actually his own demo of the song.

Innes was taken to court by the owners of the Beatles' catalogue, alleging copyright infringement of their songs. Innes had to testify under oath that he had not listened to the songs at all while composing the Rutles' songs, but had created them completely originally based on what he remembered various Beatles songs sounding like at different times.

== Songs ==
The album contains parodies of Beatles numbers such as "Ouch!" ("Help!"), "Hold My Hand" ("I Want to Hold Your Hand", "All My Loving", "She Loves You" and "Eight Days a Week"), "With a Girl Like You" ("If I Fell"), "Living in Hope" ("Don't Pass Me By"), "Love Life" ("All You Need is Love"), "Good Times Roll" ("Lucy in the Sky with Diamonds"), "Nevertheless" ("Within You Without You", "The Inner Light"), "Let's Be Natural" ("Julia" and "Dear Prudence"), "Another Day" ("Martha My Dear"), "Piggy in the Middle" ("I Am the Walrus") and "Doubleback Alley" ("Penny Lane"). The CD reissue includes "Blue Suede Schubert" ("Roll Over Beethoven"), "It's Looking Good" ("I'm Looking Through You") and "Between Us" ("And I Love Her"). "Get Up and Go" was not on the original LP – allegedly after Lennon warned Innes that it resembled "Get Back" much too closely and might prompt the music publisher, ATV Music, to sue – but was included on the CD reissue.

All songs were written by Neil Innes. Despite having received Lennon's and Harrison's blessing for the project, however, he was forced by ATV Music to credit some of the songs to Lennon–McCartney–Innes. In 1996, Innes said of this stipulation: "George occasionally attempts to get the rights back for me, but it's not high up on anyone's agenda. I've stopped sulking about it". The liner notes of the album give the names of the "Warner Brothers" as "Stan & Reg".

The only song from the film not on the soundtrack is "You Need Feet", which is not a Rutles song. Originally released in 1958, it was written and performed by comedian Bernard Bresslaw and was a parody of the 1958 Max Bygraves hit "You Need Hands".

== Track listing ==
=== 1978 vinyl album ===
The original 1978 vinyl release of the soundtrack omitted some of the material. The design of the record's inner sleeve reflected the Apple/EMI 1962–1966 ("Red") and 1967–1970 ("Blue") compilation Beatles albums released in 1973, with printed lyrics, red, blue and white layouts, and the track listing for the two album sides using similar periods (side one: 1962–67, side two: 1967–70). A humorous sticker on the shrinkwrap of the original LP release touted a “FREE RECORD WITH THIS 20-PAGE BOOK”.

==== Side 1 ====
1. "Hold My Hand" - 2:31
2. "Number One" - 2:50
3. "With a Girl Like You" - 1:50
4. "I Must Be in Love" - 2:04
5. "Ouch!" - 1:49
6. "Living in Hope" - 2:37
7. "Love Life" - 2:50
8. "Nevertheless" - 1:29

==== Side 2 ====
1. "Good Times Roll" - 3:03
2. "Doubleback Alley" - 2:54
3. "Cheese and Onions" - 2:37
4. "Another Day" - 2:09
5. "Piggy in the Middle" - 4:07
6. "Let's Be Natural" - 3:23

The remaining songs floated about as bootlegs until the 1990 re-release on CD.

=== 1990 CD re-release ===
The 1990 CD re-release not only restored the full Rutles canon, but also altered the running order of the tracks (this time intending to obviously align the songs chronologically as they would have been released individually in the Rutles universe). This broke some resemblance to track orders on original Beatles albums where the ending of a Rutles song closely resembled the ending of a Beatles song, and the same for the beginning of the next song.

Additionally, "Hold My Hand" had originally featured a fake "airplane" intro sound (a nod to "Back in the U.S.S.R.") which actually was a hairdryer, along with a count-in to the song. Due to the fact it was not the first song on the CD re-release as it had been on the original LP, this intro was removed.

No.	Title	Parody of	Length
1.	"Goose-Step Mama" (not on LP)	"Some Other Guy", "I Saw Her Standing There", and "One After 909"	2:18
2.	"Number One"	"Twist and Shout"	2:52
3.	"Baby Let Me Be" (not on LP)	"Slow Down", "She Loves You", and "I Wanna Be Your Man"	1:57
4.	"Hold My Hand" (shorter than LP version)	"I Want to Hold Your Hand", "All My Loving", "Please Please Me", "She Loves You" and "Eight Days a Week"	2:11
5.	"Blue Suede Schubert" (not on LP)	"Roll Over Beethoven", "One After 909", and "Boys"	2:13
6.	"I Must Be in Love"	"A Hard Day's Night" and "Tell Me Why"	2:06
7.	"With a Girl Like You"	"If I Fell", "I'll Follow the Sun", and "Till There Was You"	1:53
8.	"Between Us" (not on LP)	"And I Love Her"	2:03
9.	"Living in Hope"	"Don't Pass Me By" and "Act Naturally"	2:39
10.	"Ouch!"	"Help!"	1:52
11.	"It's Looking Good" (not on LP)	"I'm Looking Through You", "I Don't Want To Spoil The Party", "What Goes On", "The Night Before", and "I'll Cry Instead"	2:02
12.	"Doubleback Alley"	"Penny Lane" and "Rocky Raccoon”	2:57
13.	"Good Times Roll"	"Lucy in the Sky with Diamonds"	3:05
14.	"Nevertheless"	"Love You To", "Within You Without You" and "The Inner Light"	1:29
15.	"Love Life"	"All You Need is Love"	2:52
16.	"Piggy in the Middle"	"I Am the Walrus"	4:11
17.	"Another Day"	"Martha My Dear"	2:13
18.	"Cheese and Onions"	"A Day in the Life", "Mind Games", and "Imagine"	2:42
19.	"Get Up and Go" (not on LP)	"Get Back"	3:19
20.	"Let's Be Natural"	"Dear Prudence"	3:22

All lead vocals by Neil Innes except: Ollie Halsall on tracks 3 (co-lead with Innes), 7, 12, 17 and 19; Ricky Fataar on tracks 5, 8, and 14; and John Halsey on track 9.

Produced by Neil Innes. Engineered by Steve James. Neil Innes and Ollie Halsall.

=== The Rutles (Soundtrack) - Alternate Versions, Reissues ===
Warner Bros. Records/WB-W53151(1978/Cassette Version)

- Side 1: "Good Times Roll", "Doubleback Alley", "Cheese and Onions", "Another Day", "Piggy in the Middle", "Let's Be Natural"
- Side 2: "Hold My Hand", "Number One", "With a Girl Like You", "I Must Be in Love", "Ouch!", "Living in Hope", "Love Life", "Nevertheless"

The Canadian version, on cassette, is the only version of this release to actually be titled "Meet The Rutles", and features the album sides in the proper order, unlike the American version listed above

Warner Bros. Records/S142137/M83151/1978/8-Track Tape Version

- Track 1: "Hold My Hand", "With a Girl Like You", "I Must Be in Love", "Love Life"
- Track 2: "Number One", "Ouch!", "Nevertheless", "Doubleback Alley"
- Track 3: "Living in Hope", "Good Times Roll", "Let's Be Natural"
- Track 4: "Cheese and Onions", "Another Day", "Piggy in the Middle"

Rhino Records/1990/R275760/U.S. only release/1st CD issue

- Contains the original 14 tracks + "Goose Step Mama", "Baby Let Me Be", "Blue Suede Schubert", "Between Us", "It's Looking Good" and "Get Up and Go"
- Airplane sound effects and count in missing from "Hold My Hand"
- Insert folds out into "Rutlemania" memorabilia mini-poster
- First appearance of catalogue numbers for each track
- First mention of "The Silver Rutles Demos" and "Rutle Soul" albums
- CD label designed to look like Capitol Records Yellow & Orange Swirl 45 RPM Label

Rhino Records/2007/8122-79968-9/U.K. only release/1st U.K. CD issue

- Same material as U.S. CD (including edited "Hold My Hand" as noted above.)
- Digi-pack designed to open as a gatefold album with alternate front cover.
- Booklet contains most of the original Rutles booklet (Paul Simon interview is missing.)
- CD in Mini-Sleeve that duplicates the "other artistes on the Rutle label" album sleeve.
- CD label designed to look like Parlophone yellow and black label.
- Does not include song lyrics.

Rhino-Parlophone/2018/PCS 7018/Rocktober Vinyl series/7'' Bonus disc

- Side 1: "Goose Step Mama", "Baby Let Me Be", "Blue Suede Schubert"
- Side 2: "Between Us", "It's Looking Good" and "Get Up and Go"

This reissue features the original LP cover and Warner Bros. Records copyright bylines, with Parlophone logos and labels.

== Credits ==
- Neil Innes – vocals, rhythm guitar, keyboards, songwriting, producer
- Ricky Fataar – vocals, rhythm and lead guitars, bass guitar, sitar, tabla, percussion
- Ollie Halsall – vocals, lead and rhythm guitars, keyboards
- John Halsey – vocals, drums, percussion
- Andy Brown – bass guitar
- John Altman – orchestral arrangements.
- Cliff Haines – piccolo trumpet.
- Dave Spence, Martin Drover, Pat Kyle, Steve Gregory, Malcolm Griffiths – horns.
- Strings led by Christopher Warren-Green.

== See also ==
- The Rutles
- All You Need Is Cash
- The Rutles 2: Can't Buy Me Lunch
- The Rutles: Archaeology
- Deface the Music, a similar Beatles parody by the group Utopia
