= GRIMMS =

English musical and poetry group

- Origin: England
- Genres: Pop rock, poetry
- Years active: 1972–1976
- Labels: Island, DJM
- Spinoff of: The Scaffold; Bonzo Dog Band; Liverpool Scene
- Past members: John Gorman; Andy Roberts; Neil Innes; Mike McGear; Roger McGough; Vivian Stanshall; Adrian Henri; Brian Patten; George "Zoot" Money; Michael Giles; John Megginson; David Richards; Peter "Ollie" Halsall; John Halsey; Gerry Conway; Timmy Donald

GRIMMS were an English pop rock, comedy, and poetry group, originally formed as a merger of The Scaffold with two members of the Bonzo Dog Doo-Dah Band and the Liverpool Scene for two concerts in 1971 at the suggestion of John Gorman.

The band's name is an acronym, formed from the initial letters of each original member's surname:

- Gorman, John (The Scaffold) – vocals
- Roberts, Andy (Liverpool Scene and The Scaffold) – vocals, guitar
- Innes, Neil (Bonzo Dog Band) – vocals, keyboards, guitar
- McGear, Mike (The Scaffold) – vocals, percussion
- McGough, Roger (The Scaffold) – vocals, spoken poetry
- Stanshall, Vivian (Bonzo Dog Band) – vocals, percussion, brass instruments.

== History ==
During the late 1960s, The Scaffold and The Bonzo Dog Band had each already achieved a respectable measure of success independently of each other in the UK, through their regular appearances on television and radio and their respective chart successes in 1968 with 'Lily The Pink' and 'The Urban Spaceman'.

By 1970, while The Scaffold still remained active, The Bonzo Dog Band were technically no longer a going concern. Some members of the Bonzos would however briefly reform in 1971 to record Let's Make Up and Be Friendly to fulfill their recording contract, and as a result Neil Innes and Vivian Stanshall assembled a band to tour the UK during 1971 and 72. This group, billed variously as 'Freaks' or 'Bonzo Dog Freaks' occasionally featured Andy Roberts, who was also a close long-time associate of The Scaffold. During this period, Innes and Stanshall also guested on The Scaffold's 'Do The Albert' single and some of their more obscure musical ventures such as the theme song to the 1972 movie 'Burke And Hare'. A more formal grouping of the talents involved seemingly became inevitable.

Neil Innes said about the eventual formation of GRIMMS: "I don't know what attracted the Scaffold to the Bonzos; we were incredibly anarchic, which was probably something shared by the Scaffold as well. Hence GRIMMS, this leap in the dark."

For GRIMMS' initial performances, the six founder members were augmented by various friends and guest musicians - at the second appearance, for example, Keith Moon played drums (Moon had also played with 'Freaks', most notably on their BBC Radio One session in March 1971). However, once GRIMMS was more formally organised by 1972, regular personnel were quickly added, including:

- Adrian Henri (Liverpool Scene) – spoken vocals/poetry
- Brian Patten – spoken vocals/poetry
- Michael Giles (King Crimson) – drums
- Dave Richards (Plainsong) – bass, vocals
- John Megginson – bass, keyboards.

These eleven musicians, poets and performers formed the "real" initial version of GRIMMS, despite the acronym which only included the names of six of them. Others who appeared live and on record with the band throughout its existence included (amongst many others):

- George Bruno 'Zoot' Money – (Zoot Money's Big Roll Band and Dantalian's Chariot) – keyboards, vocals, acoustic guitar
- Peter "Ollie" Halsall (Timebox and Patto) – guitars, vocals
- Gerry Conway (Cat Stevens band and Steeleye Span) – drums
- Jon Hiseman (Colosseum) – drums
- John Halsey (Timebox and Patto) – drums
- Timmy Donald (incorrectly credited as Timmy Donnell on recordings) – drums
- Mike Kellie – drums
- Gasper Lawal – drums, percussion, chorus vocals
- Shamsi Sarumi – drums, percussion, chorus vocals
- Kate Robbins – backing vocals

All the band members were paid the same wage on the road, and members who weren't performing in a show would sit with the audience.

Roberts, Richards and Stanshall do not appear on the band's first Island Records LP, Grimms, which was a live recording compiled from a run of UK shows in 1972. Roberts and Richards were committed to touring with the band Plainsong in 1972 and so missed the performances during which the first album was recorded. The notoriously mercurial Stanshall, meanwhile, had essentially already left the group before the LP was recorded, but although he consequently never appeared on any of the band's albums, the line-up remained flexible enough to allow him to occasionally return for guest spots at concerts afterwards. Henri, Giles and Money all left after the live album was released in early 1973, to be replaced by Halsall and Conway.

During this busy period McGough, McGear, Gorman and Roberts also remained a going concern on their own terms as The Scaffold, releasing the album Fresh Liver, also on Island Records. Ostensibly a Scaffold album, the lines between the two bands became increasingly blurred as Innes, Halsall, Megginson, Money and Conway all made significant musical contributions to the LP. Innes himself recorded and released his own solo debut How Sweet To Be An Idiot in the same year backed by Roberts, Halsall, Richards and Conway. McGough and Patten, meanwhile, also continued their ongoing parallel careers as published poets. As for GRIMMS itself, although the band's line-up was in a constant state of flux, it nevertheless retained a core membership of about 10 players right through to the end of 1973.

GRIMMS' own second LP of 1973, the studio album Rockin' Duck, received generally favourable press, but shortly after its release tensions among the band's leaders reached breaking point, preventing the group from capitalising on the good reviews. During the tour behind the album in late 1973, a violent outburst from Patten towards McGear on the band's tour bus in Manchester led to McGear leaving the group. During this tour Neil Innes was absent for certain dates and John Hiseman also sat in on drums to cover for the outgoing Conway, and the absence of Innes and presence of Hiseman can be heard on a BBC Radio 1 In Concert broadcast from this period. By the end of the year Halsall had also left GRIMMS (and would soon go on to join Hiseman's new group Tempest).

During 1974, GRIMMS suspended operations entirely when The Scaffold, at McGear's instigation, reunited for a major tour in support of surprise hit single "Liverpool Lou", and most of the remaining GRIMMS – with the notable exception of Patten – accompanied them. The Scaffold then elected to record another, final album, Sold Out, and those commitments stymied any GRIMMS activity until the following year.

GRIMMS eventually reconvened early in 1975 to tour and to film a television special entitled GRIMMS on Women shown as part of the BBC series The Camera and the Song. Gorman, Innes, McGough, Roberts, Richards and Megginson were rejoined in this endeavour by Patten and a returning Zoot Money, and new arrival 'Admiral' John Halsey (formerly of Patto and currently of Innes' backing band Fatso, and later to reunite with Innes and Ollie Halsall in The Rutles) entered the scene. Halsey had a highly developed sense of comedic timing honed during his days in Patto which brought much to GRIMMS' live performances of the period. It was also around this time that GRIMMS released a book of poetry, lyrics, prose and art based loosely around their exploits on tour entitled 'Clowns on the Road'.

By the time it came to record their third and what turned out to be final album Sleepers in 1976, Halsey was unavailable and Patten and Money had both left again (although Money later contributed vocals to one track). Drummer Timmy Donald (whose name was misspelled as Donnell in the original LP credits) had joined them for the album sessions, which left the final version of GRIMMS with 'only' seven members (Gorman, Roberts, Innes, McGough, Megginson, Richards and Donald). The band set out to make the album a more overtly musical affair than before and felt they had succeeded by the end of recording, but once the album was released, GRIMMS finally fizzled out as the members went their separate ways and somehow never regrouped again. Although Sleepers proved to be the band's swansong, in the liner notes of the expanded CD reissue of the album the key members are reported as considering it their best and most cohesive recorded statement.

== Discography ==
=== Singles ===
UK releases

- "Backbreaker" / "The Masked Poet" (DJM DJS 393) July 1975
- "The Womble Bashers of Walthamstow" / "The Worst Is Yet To Come" / "Wiggle Waggle" (DJM DJS 679) June 1976
- "The Womble Bashers" / "Womble Bashers Wock" (Virgin VS 154) June 1976 by The Bashers

=== Albums ===
UK releases

- Grimms (Island HELP 11) [LP] February 1973
- Rockin' Duck (Island ILPS 9248) [LP] October 1973
- Sleepers (DJM DJLPS 470) [LP] May 1976
- Grimms / Rockin' Duck (Edsel EDCD 370) [CD] 1993 [Reissue of both 1973 albums on one disc, with two tracks from the first album omitted]
- Sleepers (Hux HUX 079) [CD] July 2006 [Reissue of the 1976 album, with eleven additional tracks]

US release

- Rockin' Duck (Antilles AN 7012) [LP] March 1976
- International Release Six Day War (Seelie Court AX007CD) [CD] June 2026 [with Brian Farrell of Colonel Bagshots singing]

=== Discography notes ===
- On the Island label releases, Grimms included Mike McGear.
- On the DJM label releases, Grimms did not include Mike McGear.
- The single, "The Womble Bashers" / "Womble Bashers Wock," is by The Bashers, including members of GRIMMS and Mike McGear.
- See also The Scaffold Discography.
- See also Mike McGear Discography.

== See also ==
- Culture of Liverpool
- Liverpool poets
- Merseybeat
