= Patto (album) =

Studio album by Patto
- Released: November 1970
- Recorded: 1970; Island Studios, London
- Genre: Progressive rock; jazz rock; hard rock; blues rock
- Length: 40:14
- Label: Vertigo (original release); Repertoire (1994 German & 2004 UK reissues); Akarma (2002 Italian reissue)
- Producer: Muff Winwood

Patto chronology
Patto (1970)	Hold Your Fire (1971)

Professional ratings
Review scores
Source	Rating
Allmusic	3/5 stars
Progressive & underground	5/5 stars

Patto is the first studio album by the rock band Patto. It was released in 1970 on Vertigo Records.

== Track listing ==
Side one
No.	Title	Writer(s)	Length
1.	"The Man"	Halsey, Griffiths, Patto, Halsall	6:12
2.	"Hold Me Back"	Halsey, Griffiths, Patto, Halsall	4:40
3.	"Time to Die"	Halsey, Griffiths, Patto, Halsall	2:54
4.	"Red Glow"	Halsey, Griffiths, Patto, Halsall	5:15

Side two
No.	Title	Writer(s)	Length
1.	"San Antone"	Halsall, Patto	3:07
2.	"Government Man"	Halsall, Patto	4:20
3.	"Money Bag"	Halsall, Patto	10:04
4.	"Sittin' Back Easy"	Halsall, Patto	3:42
Total length:			40:14

2004 re-release
No.	Title	Writer(s)	Length
14.	"Hanging Rope"	Halsey, Griffiths, Patto, Halsall	14:47
Total length:			55:01

== Personnel ==
- Mike Patto – vocals
- Ollie Halsall – lead guitar, acoustic guitar, piano, vibraphone
- Clive Griffiths – bass
- John Halsey – drums
