= Geoff Everett =

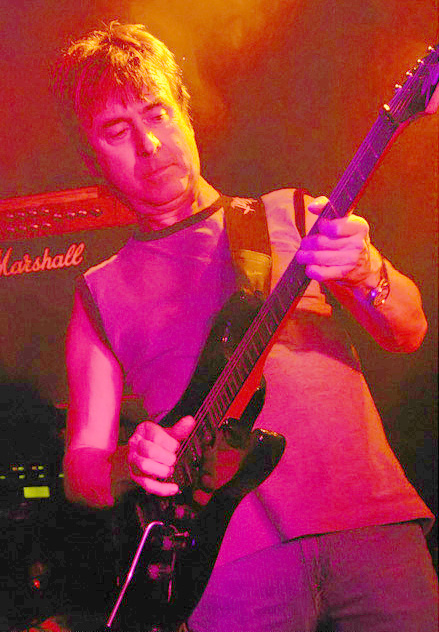
Geoff Everett playing live at 'The Doghouse' Guernsey

Geoff Everett is an English musician, band member and solo artist mainly playing blues music. He has been a member of various English rock music acts which include Chicago Line, The Mosquitoes and Screaming Lord Sutch and the Savages. Today he leads his own band.

== Early years, 1960s ==
The Chicago Line Blues Band posing in Gravesend, Kent ~ Geoff Everett, far right

In 1967, Everett joined the Chicago Line Blues Band aka Chicago Line. The group in the past had included such members as included Tim Hinkley on keyboards, Ivan Zagni on guitar, Mike Fellana on trumpet, Louis Cennamo on bass and Viv Prince on drums, Tand had released a single, "Shimmy Shimmy Ko Ko Bop" bw "Jump Back" on Philips BF 1488 in May 1966.

== 1970s to 1990s ==
Gerry McAvoy (right) and Brendan O'Neil (left) when not playing with Rory Gallagher, joined Everett (middle) in a three-piece band called The Mosquitoes.

In 1979 Everett was part of Screaming Lord Sutch & The Savages. The line up included Dave Sutch on lead vocals, himself on lead guitar, Tony Ellis on bass and Mike Crawford on drums.

== 2000s ==
The 25 November 2009 issue of Your Medway magazine had the Geoff Everett Band at no. 3 in the Top Five Kent Gigs. They were also appearing at the Royal Mail in Lydd on 4 December.

In 2012, his band released the album, The Quick and the Dead which featured Mollie Marriott, Tim Hinkley, Dave Swarbrick, and Albert Lee & Gary Barnacle on various tracks.

Also in 2015 the song "Bad Bad Man" from the album "The Quick and The Dead" was included on the Sci-Fi Horror film Tremors 5: Bloodlines released by Universal Studios. The song is used as incidental music.

His album Cut and Run did get a good review by Ger Ready to Rock with some comparison to AC/DC being made.

The Geoff Everett Band was booked to appear at the Dr Jekylls club on 25 July 2021.

== Associations ==
Everett appeared in the line up of Screaming Lord Sutch and the Savages (after the departure of Jeff Beck and Jimmy Page).

== Collaborations ==
He wrote the song "Satellite Blues" for the Rhythm and Blues band Nine Below Zero's album Off The Hook (1992).
