= All You Need Is Cash =

1978 British TV film by Eric Idle and Gary Weis

- DVD cover
- Written by: Eric Idle
- Directed by: Eric Idle; Gary Weis
- Starring: Eric Idle; Neil Innes; John Halsey; Ricky Fataar; Michael Palin; George Harrison; Bianca Jagger; John Belushi; Dan Aykroyd; Gilda Radner; Bill Murray; Mick Jagger
- Narrated by: Eric Idle
- Music by: Neil Innes
- Countries of origin: United Kingdom; United States
- Original language: English

Production
- Producers: Gary Weis; Craig Kellem; Lorne Michaels
- Cinematography: Gary Weis
- Editor: Aviva Slesin
- Running time: 76 minutes
- Production company: Broadway Video

Original release
- Network: NBC
- Release: 22 March 1978
- Network: BBC2
- Release: 27 March 1978

All You Need Is Cash (also known as The Rustles: All You Need is Cash) is a 1978 television film that traces (in mockumentary style) the career of a fictitious English rock group called the Rutles. As TV Guide described it, the group's resemblance to the Beatles is "purely – and satirically – intentional".

The film was co-produced by the production companies of Eric Idle and Lorne Michaels, and it was directed by Idle and Gary Weis. It was first broadcast on 22 March 1978 on NBC, earning the lowest ratings of any show on American prime time network television that week, though those who did watch it gave almost unanimously good reviews. It did much better in the ratings when it premiered in the UK on BBC2 on 27 March 1978.

== Premise ==
All You Need Is Cash is a series of skits and gags that illustrate the fictional Rutles story, closely following the chronology of the Beatles' career.

== Cast ==
- Eric Idle as:
  - Dirk McQuickly, a parody of Paul McCartney
  - The Narrator, a parody of Alan Whicker
  - Stanley J. Krammerhead III, Jr., occasional visiting professor of applied narcotics at the University of Please Yourself, California
- Neil Innes as Ron Nasty, a parody of John Lennon
- John Halsey as Barry Wom (Barrington Womble), a parody of Ringo Starr
- Ricky Fataar as Stig O'Hara, a parody of George Harrison
- Michael Palin as Eric Manchester, Rutle Corp. Press Agent & Lawyer, a parody of Derek Taylor
- George Harrison as The Interviewer
- Bianca Jagger as Martini McQuickly, a parody of Linda McCartney
- John Belushi as Ron Decline, the most feared promoter in the world, a parody of Allen Klein
- Dan Aykroyd as Brian Thigh, ex-record producer who turned down the Rutles, just as Decca had turned down the Beatles, a parody of Dick Rowe
- Gilda Radner as Mrs. Emily Pules
- Bill Murray as Bill Murray the K., a parody of Murray the K.
- Gwen Taylor as:
  - Mrs. Iris Mountbatten, Leggy's mother, a parody of Queenie Epstein
  - Chastity, a parody of Yoko Ono
- Ron Wood as a Hell's Angel
- Terence Bayler as Leggy Mountbatten, a parody of Brian Epstein
- Henry Woolf as Arthur Sultan, the Surrey Mystic, a parody of the Maharishi Mahesh Yogi
- Jeannette Charles as a Queen of the United Kingdom
- Mick Jagger as himself (uncredited)
- Paul Simon as himself (uncredited)
- Roger McGough as himself (uncredited)
- Ollie Halsall as Leppo, the "fifth Rutle" (à la Zeppo, the fifth Marx Brother), a parody of the so-called "fifth Beatle", Stuart Sutcliffe
- Barry Cryer as Dick Jaws, a partial parody of music publisher and singer Dick James
- Frank Williams as record producer Archie Macaw, a partial parody of George Martin
- Penelope Tree as Stig's wife, a partial parody of Harrison's first wife Pattie Boyd
- Lorne Michaels as Sleazy Merchandiser
- Al Franken as Ron Decline's Henchman
- Tom Davis as Ron Decline's Henchman
- Jerome Greene as Blind Lemon Pye
- Bob Gibson as Ruttling Orange Peel

== Production ==
=== Writing ===
The film was co-written by Eric Idle and Neil Innes. The music and events of the Rutles paralleled that of the Beatles, parodying many of the latter's career highlights. For example, the 1968 animated film Yellow Submarine became the Yellow Submarine Sandwich, and the song "Get Back" became "Get Up and Go".

=== Casting ===
The Rutles were played by Eric Idle, John Halsey, Ricky Fataar, and Neil Innes. The band originally appeared in a sketch on Idle's programme Rutland Weekend Television in 1975.

The film has many cameo appearances by both English and American comedians, including alumni of Monty Python, Saturday Night Live, and Rutland Weekend Television. George Harrison has a cameo role as a television journalist conducting an interview outside the headquarters of Rutle Corps, oblivious to the stream of people coming out of the building carrying items stolen from the office; this is a reference to the Beatles' famously plundered Apple Boutique and Apple Headquarters, where even the ceiling lining was looted. The interview ends abruptly as the microphone is stolen out of his hand.

The film also features cameos from Idle's fellow Python Michael Palin; several SNL cast members including Gilda Radner, John Belushi, Bill Murray, Dan Aykroyd, Al Franken, and Tom Davis; Bianca Jagger as Dirk McQuickly's wife Martini; Ronnie Wood as a Hells Angel; and Mick Jagger, Paul Simon, and Roger McGough as themselves.

== Soundtrack ==
Innes, a former member of the English musical comedy group Bonzo Dog Band and an associate of the Monty Python troupe, became acquainted with the Beatles when the Bonzo Dog Band had a cameo appearance in the film Magical Mystery Tour, in which they performed "Death Cab for Cutie". Paul McCartney had also produced the Bonzos' 1968 hit single, I'm the Urban Spaceman, composed and sung by Innes.

Fourteen of Innes's songs were released on a soundtrack album (the CD version added six songs omitted from the original vinyl album) named The Rutles. The album was both critically and commercially successful and was nominated for a Grammy award for Best Comedy Recording of the year. The orchestrations and arrangements for the Rutles recordings were made by film composer John Altman. John Halsey, Ricky Fataar, and Neil Innes performed their own respective musical and vocal parts, but Eric Idle's vocals were sung [slightly sped up] by Ollie Halsall, who also played the lead guitar parts.

== Home media ==
The show has been released on DVD, originally in a 66-minute version incorporating cuts for syndication, later in a "special edition" restored to its full length of 76 minutes and with extras including a commentary by Idle. The full-length version replaces a spoof newsreel voiceover by Idle with an American-sounding announcer. In 2013, the show was given a Blu-ray release in the form of a double pack with "The Rutles 2: Can't Buy Me Lunch", once again including the 76-minute version of All You Need Is Cash.

The soundtrack was reissued on CD. It included additional tracks from the original television sessions remixed in stereo by Neil Innes. Innes, Fataar and Halsey returned in 1996 to record The Rutles Archaeology, but without the involvement of Eric Idle.

== See also ==
- The Rutles soundtrack
- The Rutles 2: Can't Buy Me Lunch
- The Rutles Archaeology
