= Below the Belt =

Below the belt is a term in combat sports.

Below the Belt may also refer to:

== Music ==
- Below the Belt, a 1966 stage musical featuring Madeline Kahn
- Below the Belt, a music DVD by Hellyeah
- Below the Belt (Boxer album)
- Below the Belt (Danko Jones album)
- Below the Belt (Pigface album)
- Below the Belt, a 1986 album by TKO

== Other ==
- Below the Belt (1980 film), directed by Robert Fowler
- Below the Belt (1999 film), from List of lesbian, gay, bisexual or transgender-related films#B
