= Absolutely (Boxer album) =

- UK album cover

Studio album by Boxer
- Released: August 1977
- Recorded: 1977 at Sound City, Los Angeles
- Genre: Rock
- Length: 35:57
- Label: CBS, Epic, EMI
- Producer: Jeff Glixman

Boxer chronology
Below the Belt (1975)	Absolutely (1977)	Bloodletting (1979)

USA design
- Modified version

Professional ratings
Review scores
Source	Rating
AllMusic	4/5 stars

Absolutely is the second studio album by the band Boxer, released in 1977 on the Epic record label. Singer/pianist Mike Patto had assembled a new-look lineup including bassist Tim Bogert from Vanilla Fudge, guitarist Adrian Fisher from Sparks, Chris Stainton from Joe Cocker's band (and many others) along with drummer Eddie Tuduri from the American band Wha-Koo.

The album was also released in the U.S. with a different cover.

There had been rumours that George Martin was interested in working with Boxer. The album was eventually produced by Jeff Glixman, who had worked with the Allman Brothers and Kansas.

Patto collaborated with all the band members to write the songs on this album. "Rich Man's Daughter" is a reworking of the same song recorded by the Boxer lineup for Bloodletting, which was recorded in 1976. This album was Patto's last recording.

== Track listing ==
1. "A Fool in Love" (Tim Bogert, Mike Patto) 4:08
2. "Red Light Flyer" (Patto) 3:54
3. "Big Lucy" (Bogert, Chris Stainton, Patto) 3:58
4. "No Reply" (Stainton, Patto) 5:20
5. "Can't Stand What You Do" (Bogert, Stainton, Patto, Adrian Fisher, Eddie Tuduri) 3:58
6. "As God's My Judge" (Stainton, Patto) 3:10
7. "Rich Man's Daughter" (Patto) 4:04
8. "Everybody's a Star" (Stainton, Patto) 2:32
9. "Hand on Your Heart" (Bogert, Stainton, Patto, Fisher, Tuduri) 4:43

== Band personnel ==
- Mike Patto – lead vocals, piano
- Adrian Fisher – guitar
- Chris Stainton – keyboards
- Tim Bogert – bass, backing vocals
- Eddie Tuduri – drums

== Technical personnel ==
- Assistant Engineer: Tori Swenson
- Mixed at Village Recorders (L.A)
- Assistant Engineer: Terry Diane Becker
- Mastered by George Marino at Sterling Sound (N.Y).
- Design and Photography by Herbert W. Worthington
- Logo: Jack Upston

== Re-issues ==
- Virgin 1997
- EMI 2000

== Literature ==
- Strong, M.C. The great rock discography. Giunti (1998). ISBN 978-88-09-21522-1
