= Timebox =

Timebox may refer to:

- Timeboxing, a time management method
- Timebox (band), the 1960s musical group
