= Below the Belt (Boxer album) =

Studio album by Boxer
- Released: January 1976
- Recorded: 1975
- Genre: Rock
- Length: 37:23
- Label: Virgin, EMI
- Producer: Boxer, Richard Digby-Smith

Boxer chronology
Below the Belt (1976)	Absolutely (1977)

Professional ratings
Review scores
Source	Rating
AllMusic	2/5 stars
Christgau's Record Guide	B+
The Rolling Stone Record Guide	2/5 stars

Below the Belt is the first studio album by Boxer, released on the Virgin label in January 1976. The album attracted less attention for its music than for its artwork. Photographed by Alex Henderson with graphics by Richard Evans, the cover featured model Stephanie Marrian spreadeagled and nude but for a pair of shoes, with a man's arm reaching up between her legs and his boxing-gloved hand hiding her genitalia. The back cover at first showed Stephanie in complete full-frontal nudity, but later pressings covered her up with the band's belt-styled logo. The cover was completely re-designed for the US market using the band photo from the inside of the UK gatefold cover. The lineup on this album is a live show quartet with keyboardist Chris Stainton brought in during the recording sessions.

== Track listing ==
1. "Shooting Star" (Mike Patto, Ollie Halsall)
2. "All the Time in the World" (Halsall)
3. "California Calling" (Patto, Halsall)
4. "Hip Kiss" (Patto, Halsall, Keith Ellis, Tony Newman)
5. "More Than Meets the Eye" (Patto)
6. "Waiting for a Miracle"(Halsall)
7. "Loony Ali" (Patto, Halsall)
8. "Save Me" (Patto)
9. "Gonna Work Out Fine" (Patto, Halsall)
10. "Town Drunk" (Terry Stamp, Jim Avery)

== Personnel ==
- Ollie Halsall – guitar, keyboards
- Mike Patto – keyboards, vocals
- Keith Ellis – bass
- Tony Newman – drums
