= The Bo Street Runners =

English R&B band

- Origin: Harrow, England
- Genres: R&B; Blues rock; Garage rock; Jazz
- Years active: 1964-1966
- Labels: Decca, Columbia
- Past members: Gary Thomas; Bob O' Brien; Nigel Hutchinson; Dave Cameron; John Dominic; Tim Hinkley; Glyn Thomas; Mick Fleetwood; Mike Patto

The Bo Street Runners were an English R&B band formed in Harrow, England, during 1964. The band released four singles and an extended play record. They gained prominence in the United Kingdom after winning the Ready Steady Win! band contest and included future Fleetwood Mac drummer, Mick Fleetwood and vocalist Mike Patto.

== Early days ==
The band was formed in 1963 as The Roadrunners, but changed their name to The Bo Street Runners when it was discovered that another British group was already recording with the name. The group's original line-up included Gary Thomas on lead guitar, Bob O' Brien on keyboards, Nigel Hutchinson on drums, Dave Cameron on bass guitar and John Dominic as vocalist. They were heavily influenced by Bo Diddley in both musical style and playing technique, his name also being the inspiration for their name. They built a fanbase by playing on Sundays at the Railway Hotel, Harrow, Middlesex.

== Success in competition ==
In the spring of 1964, the band entered the Ready Steady Win! competition, a contest designed to find "the next Beatles", with a grand prize of £1,000 and a recording contract with Decca Records. The band fit the criteria to enter, which was having no recording history and at least one original composition. On 8 September 1964 the band won the contest with their performance of "I'm a Bo Street Runner". With this success, the band signed to the Decca label for their only single with the company. The single, "I'm a Bo Street Runner" which had a B-side entitled "Tell Me", sold over 20,000 copies in the United Kingdom, but did not chart nationally. Along with the single, 99 copies of an EP were produced for the band to sell at their gigs. By now the group were supporting acts such as The Rolling Stones and Tom Jones.

== Singles, change of personnel, and Mick Fleetwood ==
Following the band's single and EP, Decca sold their contract to Columbia Records in 1965. The band went through many personnel changes as band members did not like the changes in musical direction that the band heading towards. Only Thomas, Dominic and Cameron remained from the original line-up, and they were joined by two London jazzers, Roy Fry on keyboards and Glyn Thomas on drums. This line-up was to record the band's second single, a James Brown track, "Tell Me What You Gonna Do", which had no success. The third line up, in the summer of 1965 brought in Tim Hinkley on keys and Mick Fleetwood in the drum seat. Fleetwood joined when he responded to an ad in the Melody Maker, and performed almost immediately with the band.

== Further singles and a final tour ==
Their next single, more jazz than blues, was "Baby Never Say Goodbye". The song brought favourable reviews from critics and regional acclaim when it reached number 36 on the Radio London Fab Forty. It was expected to reach the UK national charts. However, there was a workers strike at the record plant issuing the band's single so only limited copies were pressed. Fleetwood and John Dominic left the band after that and a final single followed in 1966 with Mike Patto on vocals. The A-side was a soul-oriented cover of The Beatles song "Drive My Car", the group's only recording to feature Patto.

The band toured one last time, but with a lack of commercial success they decided to disband in October 1966. Fleetwood and Patto were the only members to achieve any notable success after the band split, as a member of Fleetwood Mac and a member of Patto respectively.

== Retrospective album release ==
A compilation album devoted solely to the band's material, Never Say Goodbye: The Complete Recordings 1964-1966 was released on 17 November 2014 by Cherry Red Records. The album included all of the band's recordings, including the EP single version of "I'm A Bo Street Runner", that won "Ready Steady Win!" competition.
