= The Rutles 2: Can't Buy Me Lunch =

- Written by: Eric Idle
- Directed by: Eric Idle
- Starring: Eric Idle; Neil Innes; Ricky Fataar; John Halsey
- Narrated by: Eric Idle
- Country of origin: United Kingdom
- Original language: English

Production
- Producers: Eric Idle; Lorne Michaels
- Running time: 56 minutes

Original release
- Release: 16 August 2003

Related
- All You Need Is Cash

The Rutles 2: Can't Buy Me Lunch (also known as The Rutles: Evolution or Can't Buy Me Lunch: Another Look at The Rutles) is a re-telling of the 1978 mockumentary All You Need Is Cash, in a modern setting. It premiered at the Don't Knock the Rock film festival on August 16, 2003.

== Plot ==
Twenty-four years after the original, documentarist Melvin Hall (Eric Idle) interviews musicians, actors, and other entertainment figures about the days of the popular band The Rutles.

== Cast ==
- Eric Idle as
  - Melvin Hall - The Narrator
  - Dirk McQuickly (archival footage)
  - Lady Beth Mouse-Peddler
- Neil Innes as Ron Nasty (archival footage)
- Ricky Fataar as Stig O'Hara (archival footage)
- John Halsey as Barry Wom (archival footage)
- Terence Bayler as Leggy Mountbatten (archival footage)
- Mariela Comitini as Jennifer Lopez
- Peter Crabbe as Police Officer
- Jimmy Fallon as Melvin's Son
- Samantha Harris as The Jogger
- Lily Idle as Rutles Fan
- Bianca Jagger as Martini McQuickly (archival footage)
- Bill Murray as Bill Murray the K. (archival footage)
- Kevin Nealon as Kevin Wongle
- Catherine O'Hara as Astro Glide
- Jim Piddock as Troy Nixon
- Gwen Taylor as Chastity (archival footage)
- Carinthia West as Carinthia Nasty (archival footage)
- Robin Williams as Hans Hänkie
- Henry Woolf as Arthur Sultan (archival footage)

As themselves:

- Peter Asher
- Clint Black
- David Bowie
- Billy Connolly
- Tom Hanks
- Carrie Fisher
- Mick Jagger (archival footage)
- Jewel
- Steve Martin
- Graham Nash
- Mike Nichols
- Conan O'Brien
- Bonnie Raitt
- Salman Rushdie
- Garry Shandling
- Dave Stewart
- James Taylor
- Jann Wenner

== Reception ==
The Rutles 2: Can't Buy Me Lunch received mainly negative reviews, with many complaining that it was simply an update for modern audiences. Idle did not ask for the participation of Fataar, Halsey, Innes or director Gary Weis for the making of the film, viewing it as a solo project. The film contained no new footage with the Rutles; Rutle footage consisted of outtakes and unused film produced for the original 1978 mockumentary. Though he had declined to participate in the 1996 release of Archaeology, Idle used songs from the album in the film.
