= Keith Ellis (musician) =

English bass player (1946–1978)

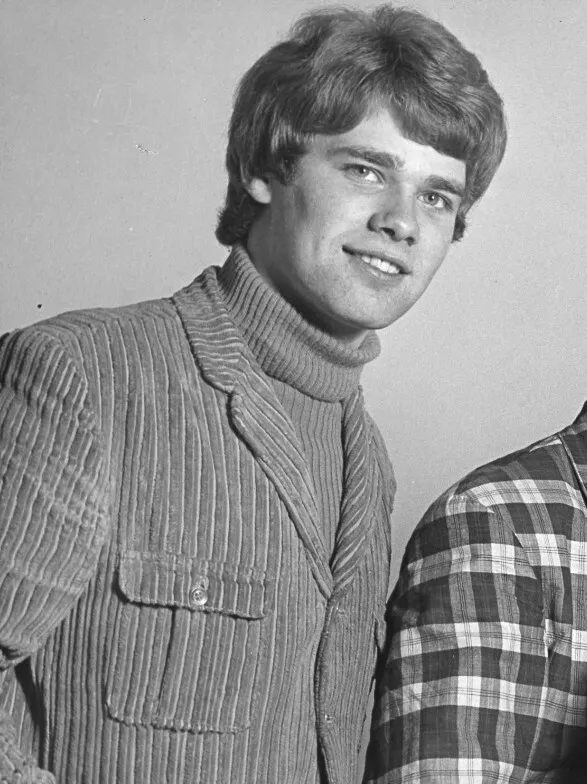
- Ellis as part of The Koobas in 1966

Background information
- Birth name: Keith Ian Ellis
- Born: 19 March 1946; Matlock, England
- Died: 12 December 1978 (aged 32); Darmstadt, Germany
- Genres: Rock
- Instrument: Bass guitar

Keith Ian Ellis (19 March 1946 – 12 December 1978) was an English bass player. He was born in Matlock, Derbyshire. He is known for his associations with The Koobas, The Misunderstood and Juicy Lucy. He was also a member of Van der Graaf Generator from 1968 to 1969. Ellis worked with Mike Patto and Ollie Halsall's band Boxer from 1975 until late 1976 when the original line-up split.

Ellis died in Darmstadt, Germany in 1978, whilst on tour with Iron Butterfly. No cause of death was determined, although the music journalist Ralph Heibutzki reported in a 2011 edition of Ugly Things that he was the victim of an accidental drug overdose. He left behind a widow, Deborah.

The song "Not For Keith" on the album pH7 by Peter Hammill, (1979) was a tribute to Ellis.
