= Goodbye Pork Pie =

1981 film by Geoff Murphy

- 2004 DVD cover
- Directed by: Geoff Murphy
- Written by: Geoff Murphy; Ian Mune
- Produced by: Geoff Murphy; Nigel Hutchinson
- Starring: Tony Barry; Kelly Johnson; Claire Oberman; Bruno Lawrence
- Cinematography: Alun Bollinger
- Edited by: Michael J. Horton
- Music by: John Charles
- Release date: 6 February 1981
- Running time: 105 minutes
- Country: New Zealand
- Language: English
- Budget: NZ$350,000
- Box office: NZ$1.4 million

Goodbye Pork Pie is a 1981 New Zealand comedy film directed by Geoff Murphy, co-produced by Murphy and Nigel Hutchinson, and written by Geoff Murphy and Ian Mune. The film was New Zealand's first large-scale local hit. One book described it as Easy Rider meets the Keystone Cops.

It was filmed during November 1979, using only 24 cast and crew. Its overheads were minimal, to the point that the police cars used doubled as crew and towing vehicles, and that the director Geoff Murphy performed some of the stunts himself.

== Plot ==
In spring 1978, in the Northland town of Kaitaia, nineteen-year-old Gerry Austin (a.k.a. 'Blondini') steals a lost wallet and uses the cash and driver's licence to rent a yellow Mini. With no particular aim in mind, he drifts down to Auckland. Meanwhile in Auckland, the middle-aged John fails to convince Sue, his girlfriend of six years, to stay with him. After a night of drinking, John decides to travel to Sue's sister's home in Invercargill to win her back.

Searching for transport, John saves Gerry from receiving a ticket for failing to wear a seat belt. As thanks, Gerry offers John a lift part of the way. The duo stop for petrol in northern Waikato but accidentally drive off without paying, drawing police attention to the car.

Further down the road, Gerry and John pick up Shirl, another drifter heading to Wanganui. After Shirl informs the duo that she is a virgin, Gerry makes a bet that this will change before reaching Wanganui. After purposely stealing petrol in the central North Island, they are pursued by a motorcycle officer, and avoid arrest by driving into a car wrecking yard, where Gerry wins his bet with Shirl.

Upon reaching Wanganui, Shirl changes her mind and decides to continue with Gerry and John as they travel onward to Wellington, where they drop her off and then and meet with Mulvaney, an old associate of John's. Mulvaney supplies them with money and drugs in return for parts of the car; while staying over at Mulvaney's garage, Gerry reunites with Shirl. As the trio leave for the Interislander ferry the next morning, Gerry runs a red light and is pursued by the police through central Wellington. The trio avoid the police by driving through the Wellington railway station and stowing the Mini in an empty boxcar being shunted onto the ferry.

In Picton on the South Island, the boxcar is attached to a train bound for Christchurch. Gerry, John, and Shirl ride it south, decorating the inside of the boxcar with Gerry's nickname "Blondini" and various items found in the other wagons and have a night of partying. The trio arrive in Christchurch in the morning and learn that the wagon is not leaving for the West Coast until that night. Gerry and John spend the day on the town and return to the train. As it leaves, they notice Shirl hasn't returned, and are forced to continue without her.

Stopping at a tearoom further down the coast, John and Gerry find out from a television news report that Shirl has been arrested for shoplifting, and that a national manhunt has been launched for the "Blondini Gang". The Mini is pursued down the Lake Hāwea shoreline by a determined policeman who almost catches Gerry and John before swerving off the road to avoid a combine harvester. Gerry stops to make sure the officer is all right and mocks the other police over the car's radio, before fleeing the scene.

The duo sell more parts off the car at Cromwell. At Dunedin, they meet the unhinged Snout, who helps them avoid a police roadblock and offers to buy the set of flags Gerry has gathered for the Mini's antenna. Gerry initially refuses, superstitious that the flags have kept them safe so far, but relents at John's urging. After Gerry and John leave, Snout tips the police off that they are heading for Invercargill.

At the Southland town of McNab, John is spotted by police and drives off in the Mini, not realising Gerry is underneath the car. Gerry is arrested, but escapes from the police car and jumps on top of the fleeing Mini. The police attack the Mini with a PIT; Gerry falls off and is hit by the pursuing police car. John bids farewell to the injured Gerry, then takes the car and proceeds to Invercargill. A trucker at the scene refuses to move aside for the police out of respect for Gerry, whose ultimate fate is not shown.

At Invercargill, John is met by a throng of admirers who have been following the Blondini Gang's cross-country journey. Members of the Armed Offenders Squad arrive. A disrespectful bystander goads them into firing at the Mini, shooting a hole in John's petrol can. While his supporters distract the officers, John diverts through a cemetery, making it to Sue's house just as the leaking petrol ignites an explosion that finally destroys the Mini, crashing into her sister's car. John reunites with Sue, and the two have sex while police surround the house. Bidding farewell to Sue, John surrenders, cracking jokes for the admiring onlookers as the police take him away.

== Cast ==
- Tony Barry as John
- Kelly Johnson as Gerry Austin
- Claire Oberman as Shirl
- Shirley Gruar as Sue
- Jackie Lowitt as Leslie Morris
- Don Selwyn as the Kaitaia police officer
- Shirley Dunn as the car rental agent
- Paki Cherrington as the taxi driver
- Christine Lloyd as the disco girl
- Maggie Maxwell as Sue's sister
- John Ferdinand as the bus station attendant
- Clyde Scott as the Auckland traffic officer
- Phil Gordin as the first service station attendant
- Bruno Lawrence as Mulvaney
- Adele Chapman as the Wellington party girl
- Ian Watkin as the father in the other yellow Mini
- Steven Tozer as the West Coast traffic officer
- Frances Edmond as Annette
- Marshall Napier as the Lake Wanaka/Lake Hāwea police officer
- Bill Juliff as the Cromwell car yard man
- John Bach as Snout
- Liz Simpson as Alice
- Alan Wilks as the Southland police sergeant
- Paul Watson as the Southland police officer
- Timothy Lee as the truck driver
- Michael Woolf as the Armed Offenders Squad leader
- Andrew Dungan at the young Armed Offenders Squad member
- Frank Prythetch as the gang leader

== Impact ==
Though coming after Sleeping Dogs, the release of Goodbye Pork Pie is considered to be the coming-of-age of New Zealand cinema as it showed that New Zealanders could make successful films about New Zealand. It was the first really financially successful New Zealand film of modern times.

== Production ==
Goodbye Pork Pie was filmed chronologically over six weeks in late 1979, following the north to south route taken by the film's protagonists. Filming began in the northern town of Kaitaia and ended in Invercargill, near the bottom of the South Island. Director Geoff Murphy, who co-produced the film with Nigel Hutchinson, had been good friends with star Tony Barry (Smith) as well as Bruno Lawrence before Goodbye Pork Pie. The three had played together in multi-media group Blerta.

Geoff Murphy cameos in the film as a man working at the second petrol station. Co-producer Nigel Hutchinson sells a banana milk shake "with an egg in it" to John a short time before Gerry falls off the car.

New Zealand band Street Talk provided most of the music heard in the film and formed a large part of the soundtrack, but the group had already broken up by the time the movie was released.

=== Cars ===
The yellow mini was a 1978 Mini 1000, registered IZ6393. Characters' names (Gerry) Austin and (Leslie) Morris echo British Leyland marques under which Minis were sold. Three 1978 Minis were used during filming. They were sourced from the New Zealand Motor Corporation (assemblers of British Leyland products in NZ). After filming was completed, two of the Minis that were undamaged were returned to The New Zealand Motor Corporation. The third, which had a hole cut in the roof and the front bodywork removed, was used for promotion and is still in New Zealand. Its actual registration is IX2992. A fourth, 1959 Mini was used for the final scene where it was burnt out. The Holden HQ police cars used in the film doubled as towing and support vehicles for the cast and crew. These were the police cars chasing the Mini throughout both the North and South Islands.

=== Locations ===
An early scene in the film shows John and his partner in a taxi, after she has left him, crossing the old Mangere Bridge. The new bridge, at the time of the film's production, was on hold for a couple of years in an unfinished state due to prolonged industrial action.

When Gerry and John pick up Shirl, she is standing in front of the now-decommissioned Meremere coal-fired power station.

The first petrol station that fuel was stolen from is located in Pōkeno, and is now a camper van sales yard. The second petrol station the trio stole fuel from is located in National Park, at the intersection of State Highway 4 and State Highway 47.

On a wet and dismal day, Gerry and John drop Shirl off at an address in Wellington. This was in Palliser Rd, Mt Victoria. When the car pulls up, they are in front of a garage with a large number '24' painted on the front. This garage has since been removed.

John introduces Gerry to his friend Mulvaney at a workshop which was at 97 Aro St, Wellington. The building is still there but somewhat modified since the movie was shot.

The Interislander ferry that the Mini is stowed on between Wellington and Picton is the MV Aratika. Aratika was taken out of service in New Zealand and sold overseas in 1999.

The Christchurch railway station where the Mini is stowed while in Christchurch was closed in 1993, replaced by a new station built in Addington. This building was used as a movie theatre and Science Alive from 1993, until the building was badly damaged in the 2011 Christchurch earthquake. The building was demolished in 2012.

A later scene in the film shows Blondini and John in Cromwell, Central Otago. The part of Cromwell shown is now underwater, due to the Lake Dunstan hydroelectric project.

The scene at McNab, Southland where Gerry is caught by the police shows a decrepit old toilet block at the side of the road. It was actually a temporary structure built specifically for the film.

== Remake ==
In 2014, a remake of the film was announced, with Matt Murphy – one of Geoff Murphy's sons who had worked on the original version – as director. The same year, a re-enactment of the Lake Hāwea chase was filmed to promote the New Mini, which featured prominently in the remake, simply known as Pork Pie.

Filming of Pork Pie started in March 2016. Dean O'Gorman, James Rolleston and Ashleigh Cummings star as Jon (John), Luke (Gerry) and Kiera (Shirl) respectively. The film's first trailer was released on 17 October 2016, with the film released in cinemas on 2 February 2017. The remake was not as successful as the original.
