= Tim Hinkley =

English musician and producer (1946–2024)

- Also known as: The Reverend; The Protector of the Pomeranian
- Born: Timothy Alan Hinkley; 25 May 1946; London, England
- Died: 20 August 2024 (aged 78)
- Genres: Rock; soul
- Occupations: Keyboardist; singer; arranger
- Instruments: Keyboards; organ, flute; percussion; vocals
- Years active: 1964–2024

Timothy Alan Hinkley (25 May 1946 – 21 August 2024) was an English singer-songwriter, keyboardist and record producer. Born in London, Hinkley started playing in youth club bands in the early 1960s, with bands including the Copains, Boys and the Freeman Five. During this time he turned down an offer to join the Konrads, which featured Davy Jones, who later changed his name to David Bowie. Other early associations were with the Bo Street Runners, Chicago Blues Line and Patto's People.

== Credits as a session musician ==
Hinkley recorded with many artists, including George Harrison, The Rolling Stones, The Who, Van Morrison, Johnny Hallyday, Steve Marriott, Alvin Lee, Al Stewart, Roger Chapman, Humble Pie, Whitesnake, Dr. Feelgood, Roger Daltrey, Thin Lizzy, Tim Buckley, Joan Armatrading, Esther Phillips, Tom Waits, Warren Zevon and Alexis Korner. He was a backing musician for Elkie Brooks and touring American musicians such as Sonny Boy Williamson, Lee Dorsey, Carla Thomas and Ben E. King. Hinkley also toured and recorded as a session musician keyboard player with other artists.

== Jody Grind and Boxer ==
In 1965 he formed the Hammond organ trio Jody Grind with lead guitarist Ivan Zagni and drummer Barry Wilson. They recorded two albums, One Step On in 1969 and Far Canal, which featured Bernie Holland on guitars and Pete Gavin on drums released in 1970 on the British record label Transatlantic Records.

In 1976 Hinckley appeared with the band Boxer and associated musicians in the line up of Mel Collins, Neil Hubbard, Mike Patto, Alan Spenner, Carol Grimes, Bobby Tench, Henry McCullough, Boz Burrell, Simon Kirke and John Halsey.

He appeared on the album Bloodletting by Boxer released in 1979.

== Hinkley's Heroes ==
During this period he formed the touring jam band Hinkley's Heroes. It comprised established British musicians including Bobby Tench, guitarist Steve Simpson, Mel Collins, Neil Hubbard, John Halsey and bass player Kuma Harada. They were occasionally joined on stage by others such as Phil Collins, Joe Cocker, Kiki Dee and Eric Burdon.

On 17 March 2015, a variation of the lineup of Hinkley's Heroes appeared as Henry's Heroes at a benefit concert for Henry McCullough at the Half Moon music venue in Putney, London. They were also the backing band for Paul Carrack, Nick Lowe, Andy Fairweather Low, Suggs and Bobby Tench.

== iDigtunes ==
Hinkley founded the music library and songwriting company iDigtunes in the third millennium.

== Death ==
Hinkley died on 21 August 2024, at the age of 78.

== Discography ==
- Bo Street Runners - "Baby Never Say Goodbye" / "Get Out of My Way" (1965), "Drive My Car" / "So Very Woman" (1966)
- Jody Grind - One Step Beyond (1969), Far Canal (1970)
- Al Stewart – Zero She Flies (1970), The Early Years (1977)
- Alvin Lee – On the Road to Freedom (1973), In Flight (1974), Nineteen Ninety-Four (1994), Saguitar (2007)
- Esther Phillips – Black-Eyed Blues (1973)
- Vinegar Joe – Vinegar Joe (1974)
- Beckett - Beckett (1974)
- Chapman Whitney – Streetwalkers (1974)
- Johnny Hallyday – Rock a Memphis (1975), Phantasm (musical director)
- Snafu – All Funked Up (1975)
- Tom Waits – BBC Television Special (1975)
- Pete Sinfield – Still (1973)
- Humble Pie – Street Rats (1975) and The Scrubbers Sessions (1997) producer
- Snape – Snape Live (1976)
- Thin Lizzy – Jailbreak (1976)
- Paul Kennerley - White Mansions: A Tale from The American Civil War 1861-1865 (1978)
- Bad Company – Run with the Pack (1976), Desolation Angels (1979)
- Joan Armatrading – Show Some Emotion (1977)
- Dr. Feelgood – Sneakin' Suspicion (1977)
- David Coverdale – White Snake (1977), Northwinds (1978)
- Whitesnake – Snakebite (1978)
- The Rolling Stones – Some Girls (1978)
- The Who – Quadrophenia, film soundtrack (1979)
- Boxer – Bloodletting (1979)
- Roger Chapman and The Short List – Live in Hamburg (1979) as musical director and keyboard player, He Was, She Was (1982), Mail Order Magic (1980), The Riffburglar Album, Hyenas Only Laugh For Fun (1981) and Zipper (1986)
- Tim Buckley – Morning Glory (2001) and Once I Was (1999) bass guitar
- Mr.Lucky – Satisfied: Live In The USA
- Tim Hinkley – A Little Bit Of Soul (2003) solo album produced by Dan Penn
- Lulu – DVD "Live" (2005)
- Heiri Muller – Footsteps (2005)
- Hinkley's Heroes – Hinkley's Heroes (2005)
- The Geoff Everett Band – The Quick and the Dead (2012)

== Other associations ==
- Lulu – musical director on Red Hot & Live: Soul tour (1989).
- Van Morrison (1984)
- George Harrison. Also co-wrote "Heart and Soul"
- Elkie Brooks, Shooting Star (1978)
- Korner/Thirup/Hinkley (1976–78)
- Lindisfarne
