= The Koobas =

English beat group

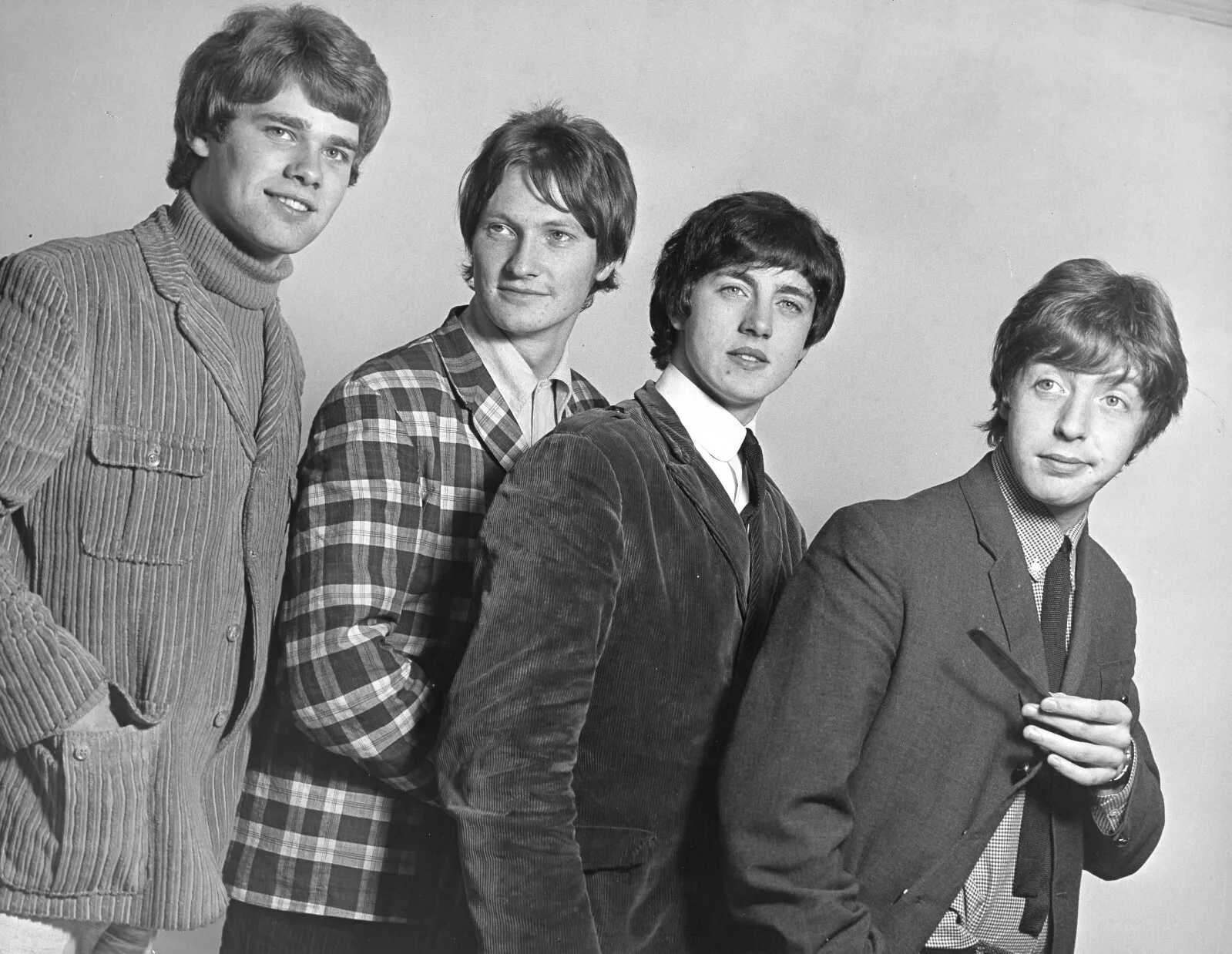
- The Koobas in 1966. Left to right: Keith Ellis, Roy Morris, Tony O'Reilly and Stuart Leathwood

Background information
- Origin: Liverpool, England
- Genres: Psychedelic rock; psychedelic pop; freakbeat
- Years active: 1962–1968
- Labels: Pye; EMI-Columbia
- Past members: Roy Montrose; Stuart Leathwood; Roy Morris; Pete Williams; Keith Ellis; John Morris; Kenny Cochran; Tony O'Reilly

The Koobas were an English beat group from Liverpool. Their music, and their early history, is similar in some ways to that of fellow Liverpudlians The Beatles, though they never achieved widespread popularity.

== History ==
The group was founded in April 1962 in Liverpool by members who had previously played in local outfits such as the Thunderbeats and Roy Montrose and the Midnighters. They used both the spellings "Kubas" and "Koobas" at times. Late in 1963 they began playing at the Star Club in Hamburg, Germany, doing a three-week stint there.

Tony Stratton Smith signed them to a contract in 1964 and brokered them a deal with Pye Records. In 1965, they were to appear in the film Ferry Cross the Mersey (a Gerry & The Pacemakers vehicle), as the losers in a battle of the bands, but this footage was cut from the film's final release. Their first single was "I Love Her" b/w "Magic Potion", which did not make the chart, but the group opened for The Beatles on their last British tour to support the single.

In the summer of 1965 they played, as resident group, in the Rock Ballroom at Butlin's Ayr, Scotland.

Following the dates with the Beatles, the group did club tours of England and attracted much positive press, but further singles failed to catch on with the public. In 1966, they moved from Pye to EMI Columbia Records, and the following year played with The Who at the Savile Theatre and performed alongside Jimi Hendrix in Switzerland.

By 1967, the band had started to change its sound from R&B-rooted beat to psychedelia, and began writing their own material. In 1968 they cut a version of the Cat Stevens-penned "The First Cut Is the Deepest", but were overshadowed by P.P. Arnold's version, which hit the UK Singles chart Top 20. Near the end of 1968, the group splintered just as EMI-Columbia prepped their self-titled first LP, released early in 1969. The Koobas never made it into the official sales chart but their cover of the Gracie Fields hit, "Sally", climbed as high as number 21 on pirate station Radio London's Fab 40 in January 1967.

Drummer Tony O'Reilly joined Yes in September 1968, after Bill Bruford's departure to go to university, but Bruford returned in November of that year. He went on to play briefly with Bakerloo.

Keith Ellis later played with Van der Graaf Generator and Juicy Lucy, while Stuart Leathwood formed the duo Gary & Stu and later played with March Hare. The group's entire post-1966 output was reissued on CD in 2000 by the Beat Goes On label.

== Band members ==
- Roy Montrose - lead vocals (April 1962–1962) (born 17 August 1942, Old Swan, Liverpool)
- Stu Leathwood - rhythm guitar, lead vocals (April 1962–September 1968; born Stewart Anthony Leathwood, 1 April 1942, Rock Ferry, Cheshire died 31 January 2004)
- Roy Morris - lead guitar, backing vocals (April 1962–September 1968; born Roy William Morris, 18 April 1946, Liverpool)
- Peter Williams - bass guitar (April 1962–October 1964)
- John Morris - drums (April 1962–1962; 1944, Liverpool)
- Kenny Cochran - drums (1962–October 1964)
- Keith Ellis - bass guitar, backing vocals (October 1964–September 1968; died 12 December 1978)
- Tony O'Reilly - drums (October 1964–September 1968; born Antony Richard Thomas O'Reilly, 19 April 1947, Liverpool)

== Discography ==
=== Albums ===
Year	Album title	Track listing
1969	Koobas: January 1969; EMI-Columbia; catalogue No. SCX 6271 stereo; catalogue No. SX 6271 mono	Side One: "Royston Rose" "Where Are The Friends?" "Constantly Changing" "Here's A Day" "Fade Forever" Side Two: "Barricades" "A Little Piece of My Heart" "Gold Leaf Tree" "Mr. Claire" "Circus"

=== Singles ===
Year	Song	Chart positions
Year	Song	UK Singles
1965	I Love Her B-side: "Magic Potion"	-
1965	"Take Me For A Little While" B-side: "Somewhere In The Night"	(Note: "Take Me For A Little While" failed to chart on the record chart compiled by Record Retailer, but did reach #28 on the one compiled by Melody Maker.)
1966	"You'd Better Make up Your Mind" B-side: "A Place I Know"	-
1966	"Sweet Music" B-side: "Face"	-
1967	"Sally" B-side: "Champagne & Caviar"	54 (Note: Chart position is from the official UK "Breakers List".)
1967	"Gypsy Fred" B-side: "City Girl"	-
1968	"The First Cut Is the Deepest" B-side: "Walking Out"	-
1969	"Where Are The Friends?" B-side: "Royston Rose"	-
