= Nigel Hutchinson =

English-New Zealand producer (1941–2017)

Robert William Nigel Hutchinson (13 July 1941 – 23 March 2017) was an English-born New Zealand film producer and commercial director best known for co-producing the 1981 film, Goodbye Pork Pie, with Geoff Murphy. Hutchinson also made a small cameo in the classic New Zealand film as a dairy farmer. He produced other films and television commercials, most recently Home by Christmas in 2010.

Hutchinson, the son of a Royal Air Force pilot, was born in England on 13 July 1941. He began his film career as a press officer for the Walt Disney Company's London office. An original drummer for the British band The Bo Street Runners, Hutchinson left the band to work for Disney full-time. His position in the band was filled by drummer Mick Fleetwood, who later formed Fleetwood Mac.

Hutchinson next joined a production company owned by actor David Hemmings. While working with Hemmings, Hutchinson became friends with New Zealand cinematographer, Graeme Cowley. Huctinson and Cowley soon partnered in 1974 to form two film companies based in Wellington, New Zealand – Film Facilities, a film rental company, and their production company, Motion Pictures Limited. The duo hoped to profit from New Zealand's expanding film and television industries during the 1970s.

Hutchinson originally met Geoff Murphy, who had already penned an early, handwritten screenplay for the film that would become Goodbye Pork Pie through his new production companies. Hutchinson and Cowley soon joined the production as co-producers. Together, Hucthinson, Murphy and Cowlet kept the production on a shoe-string budget of just NZ $450,000. Released in 1981, Goodbye Pork Pie became the first New Zealand-made film to recoup its original budget solely from domestic NZ box office sales. It also became the first New Zealand film to screen at the Cannes Film Festival.

Cowley later focused on their Film Facilities rental division, while Nigel Hutchinson directed and produced television commercials. Hutchinson won several international awarded for his commercials, including a Gold Clio Award, a Gold Lion from the Cannes Lions International Festival of Creativity, and a Mobies award. His commercial portfolio featured Kiwi and international celebrities including Richard Briers, Richard Hadlee, Felicity Kendal, and Dennis Waterman.

Nigel Hutchinson died at his home in Picton, on 23 March 2017, at the age of 75. He was survived by his wife of 42 years, Sue, and two children.
