= Archaeology (album) =

Studio album by the Rutles
- Released: 29 October 1996
- Recorded: 1978, 1996
- Genres: Pop rock; comedy rock; psychedelic pop
- Length: 49:43
- Labels: EMI; Virgin (US)
- Producer: Neil Innes

The Rutles chronology
The Rutles (1978)	Archaeology (1996)

UK Reissue cover
- The cover to the 2007 UK CD reissue.

Professional ratings
Review scores
Source	Rating
AllMusic	4/5 stars

Archaeology is the second album by parody band the Rutles. Like their previous release, the album contains pastiches of Beatles songs.

Three of the four musicians who had created the soundtrack for the 1978 film—Neil Innes, John Halsey, and Ricky Fataar—reunited in 1996 and recorded a second album, Archaeology, an affectionate send-up of The Beatles Anthology albums (although its original cover design rather parodied that of The Beatles' singles compilation Past Masters: Volume One). The fourth 'real' Rutle, Ollie Halsall, died in Spain in 1992. Eric Idle was invited to participate, but declined.

Like the Anthology project that it lampooned, it featured tracks ostensibly from all periods of the Rutles' career, sequenced to reflect the fictional band's chronology. Several of the songs were actually older Innes songs that were dusted off and given the 'Rutles' treatment. The reunion was blessed by George Harrison, who encouraged The Pre-Fab Four to proceed. When approached, Harrison told Innes, 'Sure. It's all part of the "soup"...', an encounter that Innes related in interviews in 1996. He also asked which member of the band would be shot, according to a 2001 Paley Center interview with Innes.

The reunion was triggered by Innes's appearance at the Los Angeles festival "Monty Python: Lust For Glory!", an event that celebrated the 25th anniversary of the Monty Python troupe and was produced by Martin Lewis for the American Cinematheque. Innes performed two sold-out gigs at Los Angeles's Troubadour Club under the name "Ron Nasty & The New Rutles", using a local Beatles tribute band.

Following the success of the shows, Lewis and Innes collaborated on the project that became Archaeology.

== Track listing ==
Below is a track listing, citing the original Beatles song(s) and other sources thought to be part of the inspiration for each individual track (where applicable).

Track	Song	Running time	Sources + Notes
1	"Major Happy's Up-And-Coming Once Upon a Good Time Band"	2:19	"Sgt. Pepper's Lonely Hearts Club Band"
2	"Rendezvous"	2:06	"With a Little Help from My Friends" with backing vocals reminiscent of "Good Day Sunshine" and "A Day in the Life"
3	"Questionnaire"	2:41	An old Innes composition, either from the stage show Neil Innes is Joe Public (1985) or from the stage show More Jam Tomorrow (1992). Musically a composite of "The Fool On The Hill", "Imagine", "I Am the Walrus", "Eleanor Rigby", and "Nowhere Man" with pointed lyrics referring to Lennon's assassination and American gun-ownership laws.
4	"We've Arrived! (And to Prove It We're Here)"	2:09	"Back in the U.S.S.R." and "Flying" with a "Revolution 9" reference in the ending. (taped 1978 rehearsal featuring Halsall)
5	"Lonely-Phobia"	2:35	Acoustic ballads from A Hard Day's Night-era, especially "Things We Said Today" and "I'll Be Back". It may also contain references to "Spanish" chord progression used in early rehearsal versions of "I Me Mine" and to guitar riffs from McCartney/Wings song "Deliver Your Children".
6	"Unfinished Words"	2:08	An original composition making use of an unused music track featuring Halsall from the 1978 recordings in the manner of "Free as a Bird" and "Real Love"; lyrically a play on the anecdote about "Yesterday" and its 'scrambled eggs' dummy lyrics, setting numerous lyrical references to Martin Lewis's 'fake Beatles outtakes' hoax set to a tune resembling "Glass Onion", "Nowhere Man", and "In My Life".
7	"Hey Mister!"	3:18	Broadly similar to "I Me Mine" and "Yer Blues", references "Helter Skelter" at the ending, and features "hey!" calls reminiscent of "The Continuing Story Of Bungalow Bill". Also bears similarities to "Glass Onion" and "You've Got to Hide Your Love Away".
8	"Easy Listening"	2:09	An old Innes composition, either from the stage show Neil Innes Is Joe Public or from the stage show More Jam Tomorrow, rearranged as a pastiche of "Octopus's Garden", with some suggestions of "Don't Pass Me By" and "Act Naturally", and a lyrical reference to "Why Don't We Do It in the Road?"
9	"Now She's Left You"	2:03	A pastiche of "I Don't Want to Spoil the Party", "We Can Work It Out", and "You're Going to Lose That Girl", written for the original film but unused. In 1981, a doo-wop arrangement of this song was featured on Innes's television series The Innes Book of Records (taped 1978 rehearsal featuring Halsall)
10	"The Knicker Elastic King"	2:39	A 1981 composition of Innes's, rearranged in the style of "Getting Better". The horn solo ostensibly comprises Eric Spear's theme from Coronation Street, referencing Wings's cover of the theme from Crossroads. The spoken middle-eight homages the Yellow Submarine film and Ringo Starr's children's TV narration. The mix also include a brief extract from a French radio broadcast, reflecting a similar segment in Wings' song "Picasso's Last Words".
11	"I Love You"	2:18	"It's Only Love" and "And I Love Her"
12	"Eine Kleine Middle Klasse Musik"	4:24	A 1992 Innes composition rearranged in the style of "Come Together", with a Rhodes riff borrowed from "Maybe I'm Amazed".
13	"Joe Public"	4:03	A 1985 Innes song from the stage show Neil Innes is Joe Public, rearranged in the style of "Tomorrow Never Knows" and "Rain", with Fataar singing lead. It features Indian instruments and a meandering string session reminiscent of "Within You, Without You".
14	"Shangri-La"	7:43	A 1977 song by Innes, newly infused with 1967-era Beatles references and a new "Hey Jude"-style coda. "A Day in the Life" forms the backbone of the song, which variously transforms into "Being for the Benefit of Mr. Kite!" and "Lucy in the Sky with Diamonds" amongst others, features a chorus suggested by "All You Need Is Love" and "Magical Mystery Tour", and contains a horn riff taken directly from "For No One"; The intro quotes Oasis's "Whatever", in reference to EMI's successful plagiarism lawsuit against that song's melodic similarity to Innes's 1973 single "How Sweet to Be an Idiot".
15	"Don't Know Why"	3:44	Written a year in advance of the album for the TV show Rory Bremner: Who Else (which attributed it to Ron Nasty); it directly pastiches "Free as a Bird", and references Innes' then-current hardships relating to the original Rutles project, including his settling of the ATV lawsuit and his fractious relationship with Eric Idle.
16	"Back in '64"	3:14	An answer song to "When I'm Sixty-Four", with a solo reminiscent of the Moog lines in "Maxwell's Silver Hammer". The "zum zum zum zum" backing vocals reference those of Innes's 1977 song "Crystal Balls".

All songs were credited solely to Innes; all lead vocals by Innes except for Fataar on tracks 5 and 13, and Halsey on tracks 2 and 8. (Innes briefly sings a second lead in the middle of track 8.)

Instrumentation: Neil Innes (vocals/guitar), Ricky Fataar (vocals/guitar/drums), John Halsey (vocals/drums), Ollie Halsall (vocals/guitar, tracks 4, 6 & 9 only) with Mickey Simmonds (keyboards), Malcolm Foster (bass), Dougie Boyle (guitar), Bernie Holland (guitar)

Arrangements: Mickey Simmonds & Neil Innes. Orchestra arranged and conducted by John Altman. Recorded and mixed by Steve James.

The Japanese release of Archaeology includes 4 bonus tracks: "Lullaby", "Baby S'il Vous Plait", "It's Looking Good" (rehearsal), and "My Little Ukulele". "Baby S'il Vous Plait" and "It's Looking Good" were also issued (along with the LP version of "Joe Public") on a UK CD single and 10" of "Shangri-La."

"Baby S'il Vous Plait" is a "Franglais" version of an earlier Rutles song "Baby Let Me Be", from the 1978 soundtrack. The song was recorded as a pastiche of the Beatles' two German-language recordings, with suitably poor translation and even poorer foreign accents. "My Little Ukulele" is a George Formby-esque novelty number, melding McCartney's many experiments with old-time composition ("Honey Pie", "When I'm 64" etc.) with Harrison's fondness for Formby and the ukulele. "Lullaby" is a brief musical gag from Innes's own live act re-recorded as though it were Ron Nasty amusing the studio staff.

On 19 February 2007 EMI Gold (UK) released a budget reissue of Archaeology with new cover artwork and five bonus tracks: The aforementioned "Lullaby," "My Little Ukulele," and "Baby S'il Vous Plait" surfaced again, and two previously unreleased numbers; "Under My Skin", a cover of Cole Porter's "I've Got You Under My Skin" performed with some mock half-forgotten lyrics to suggest the Beatles' Star Club era and "Rut-A-Lot", a medley of Rutles songs performed live by Innes, presented as a jab at Idle's recently successful Spamalot.

== Alternate versions and re-issues ==
"Archaeology" / Virgin Records America / Vinyl L.P. / U.K. only release / 7243-8-42200-1-3-VUSLP 119

(Same material as: "Archaeology"/ Virgin Records America/ C.D. / U.K./U.S. Release / 7243-8-42200-2-0)

Side 1: "Major Happy's Up & Coming Once Upon a Good Time Band", "Rendezvous", "Questionnaire", "We've Arrived ( And to Prove It We're Here!)", "Lonely-phobia", "Unfinished Words", "Hey Mister!", "Easy Listening", "Now She's Left You", "The Knicker Elastic King"

Side 2: "I Love You", "Eine Kliene Middle Klasse Music", "Joe Public", "Shangri-La", "Don't Know Why", "Back n 64"

- Vinyl album contains same 16 tracks as CD release.
- Vinyl contains inner sleeve with two Rutles photos and album credits, but no lyrics.
- CD contains booklet with photos and lyrics.
- Label photo of The Rutles asleep is a parody of the Elton John album Sleeping with the Past

"Archaeology"/ Virgin Records / C.D. / Japanese Version / VJCP-25277

- Contains same 16 tracks as U.K. / U.S. release
- Contains four bonus tracks: "Lullaby", "Baby S'il Vous Plait", "It's Looking Good (Demo)", "My Little Ukulele"
- Contains same booklet as U.K./U.S. release
- Contains supplemental lyric sheets in English and Japanese for all 20 tracks.

"Archaeology" / EMI Gold / 2007 / C.D. / U.K. only release / 0946-3-85349-2-1

- Contains original 16 tracks + "Lullaby", "Baby S'il Vous Plait", "My Little Ukulele" and the previously unreleased "Under My Skin" and "Rut-A-Lot".
- Contains different booklet and artwork, with a condensed history of the Rutles.
- Contains no lyrics.

=== "Shangri-La" single releases (1996) ===
10" Vinyl Single: "Shangri-La" /Virgin Records America / 7243-8-93929-0-6 VUSA117

Side A. "Shangri-La"

Side B. "Joe Public","Baby S'il Vous Plait","It's Looking Good ( Demo )"

- Neil Innes provides silly liner notes for "Baby S'il Vous Plait" & "It's Looking Good ( Demo )"
- Same material also released as a C.D. Single (7243-8-93929-2-0-VUSCD117)
- "Shangri-La" was also released as a single song promotional C.D. (70876-11582-29-DPRO-11582) This version is titled "Shangri-La (Edit)" and runs at 4 minutes, 20 seconds, fading the song out much earlier. An alternate, re-edited, shortened version created for the promo video exists which has never been released on any single or DJ promo.

== See also ==
- The Rutles
- All You Need Is Cash
- The Rutles Soundtrack
- The Rutles 2: Can't Buy Me Lunch
- Deface the Music, a similar Beatles parody by the group Utopia
