= Patto =

English progressive rock band

- Origin: London, England, United Kingdom
- Genres: Hard rock; blues rock; jazz rock; progressive rock
- Years active: 1970–1973
- Labels: Vertigo, Pye, Island, Deram
- Past members: Mike Patto (deceased); John Halsey; Ollie Halsall (deceased); Clive Griffiths

Patto were an English rock band, formed in London in 1970.

Founded by vocalist Mike Patto, their lineup was taken from Timebox, consisting of vocalist Patto, guitarist and vibraphone player Ollie Halsall, bassist Clive Griffiths and drummer John Halsey.

== Early days and singles ==
Timebox developed from a complicated pedigree that included members of The Bo Street Runners, Patto's People and Chicago Blue Line. This soul psych pop combo made two singles for Pye's label Piccadilly before signing to Decca's Deram, releasing five singles on the label between 1967 and 1969. They appeared on BBC radio shows such as Noise at Nine, Stuart Henry on Sunday and Jimmy Young. Keyboard player Chris Holmes left after their last single release and they began experimenting with progressive rock.

== Progressive rock ==
In 1970, Patto was formed by members of Timebox and signed to the newly formed Vertigo label. With Muff Winwood as producer, they recorded their first album live in the studio.

In December 1971, Patto entered the studio again to record their second album, Hold Your Fire, after which they were dropped from the Vertigo roster. Despite poor record sales, they were becoming known as an exciting live act. Through his connections in England, Muff Winwood was able to have the band signed to Island, and they recorded the album Roll 'em Smoke 'em Put Another Line Out in 1972.

In 1973, the band began to record their fourth album. Mike Patto wrote songs that were less cynical than the usual Patto material and much more commercial. The ensuing album, Monkey's Bum, was not released. Without Halsall and with each member now involved in other projects, Mike Patto chose to disband Patto, going on to form Boxer with Halsall.

In 2009, Patto's song "The Man" was used in trailers for the film Observe and Report starring Seth Rogen and Anna Faris and was included along with another track, "Sittin' Back Easy", on the film's soundtrack.

== Band members ==
- Mike Patto – vocals
- Ollie Halsall – lead guitar, acoustic guitar, piano, vibraphone
- Clive Griffiths – bass
- John Halsey – drums

== Discography ==
=== Studio albums ===
- 1970 – Patto
- 1971 – Hold Your Fire
- 1972 – Roll 'em Smoke 'em Put Another Line Out
- 2017 – Monkey's Bum (recorded 1973 but not authorised for release until 2017)

=== Live albums ===
- 2000 – Warts and All
