= The Rutles =

Parody group of the Beatles

- The Rutles in All You Need Is Cash. From left: Eric Idle, Ricky Fataar, John Halsey, Neil Innes.

Background information
- Origin: Rutland, England
- Genres: Rock; pop; parody; comedy; psychedelia
- Years active: 1975–1978, 1996–1997, 2002–2019
- Labels: Warner Bros., Rhino, Virgin
- Past members: Eric Idle; Neil Innes; David Battley; John Halsey; Ricky Fataar; Ollie Halsall
- Website: www.rutles.org

The Rutles (/ˈrʌtəlz/) were a spoof rock band that performed visual and aural pastiches and parodies of the Beatles. This originally fictional band, created by Eric Idle and Neil Innes for a sketch in Idle's mid-1970s BBC television comedy series Rutland Weekend Television, later toured and recorded, releasing two studio albums and garnering two UK chart hits. The band toured again from 2002 until Innes's death in 2019.

Encouraged by the positive public reaction to the sketch, Idle wrote the mockumentary television film All You Need Is Cash (1978, a.k.a. The Rutles). Idle co-directed the film with Gary Weis; it features 20 Beatles' music pastiches written by Innes, which he performed with three musicians as the Rutles. A soundtrack album in 1978 was followed in 1996 by Archaeology, which spoofed the then-recent Beatles Anthology series. A second film, The Rutles 2: Can't Buy Me Lunch (modelled on the 2000 TV special The Beatles Revolution), was made in 2002 and released in the US on DVD in 2003.

== History ==
=== Rutland Weekend Television (1975–1976) ===
The Rutles were foreshadowed in episode 3 of Eric Idle's 1975 BBC television series Rutland Weekend Television, in which Neil Innes accompanied himself on a piano singing what later became the song "Good Times Roll" (included on the Rutles' first, self-titled album in 1978). The Rutles themselves first appeared in a sketch later in 1975, which presented a mock mini-documentary about the fictional 1960s band. The sketch featured Neil Innes (formerly of the Bonzo Dog Doo Dah Band and a frequent Monty Python collaborator) fronting the band, singing "I Must Be in Love", a pastiche of Lennon and McCartney's 1964 style.

The sketch was the work of Innes and Idle. Innes was the musician and composer for Rutland Weekend Television, and he routinely created songs along with ideas of how to present the songs on the show. After writing "I Must Be in Love", Innes conceived parodying the film A Hard Day's Night, because he felt the song sounded very "Beatle-y". He passed the idea of a Beatles spoof along to Idle, who had a separate idea about a boring TV documentary maker, and they merged the ideas into a single extended sketch for the TV show. The "Rutles" band name was a running joke based on the regional premise of the TV show, which was presented as a programme by a fictional TV station based in Rutland, the smallest county in England. The initial idea had been to do a parody of the Rolling Stones called the Rutland Stones but, when it became a parody of the Beatles, Idle suggested the name "Rutles". "The Prefab Four" is a play on the Beatles' nickname "the Fab Four" with an additional subtext: a prefab was a cheap postwar form of British housing, intended to be temporary, often poorly constructed, draughty and leaky, and not well-regarded by those who had to live in it.

The Rutles had connections with the Beatles aside from the parody. The Beatles were fans of Innes's previous band, the Bonzo Dog Doo-Dah Band, and had featured the Bonzos in their television film Magical Mystery Tour (1967). Paul McCartney (working with Gus Dudgeon under the collective alias Apollo C. Vermouth) had produced the Bonzos' hit single "I'm the Urban Spaceman" in 1968. George Harrison made a guest appearance on Rutland Weekend Television's 1975 Boxing Day special, with Idle and Innes, and he encouraged them to make a film that would parody the Beatles' career and serve to deflate the myths surrounding the band's legacy.

In 1976, BBC Records produced The Rutland Weekend Songbook, an album containing 23 tracks including the Rutles songs "I Must Be in Love" and "The Children of Rock and Roll" (later reworked as "Good Times Roll").

=== Saturday Night Live (1976–1977) ===
One year after their initial BBC appearance, on 2 October 1976 Idle appeared on the American NBC show Saturday Night Live, and showed videotape extracts from Rutland Weekend Television – including the Rutles clip. That led to a suggestion by SNL executive producer Lorne Michaels to extend the skit into a one-hour mock documentary for television. This proposal led to the mockumentary All You Need Is Cash (1978), directed by SNL film director Gary Weis, with Idle credited as co-director.

On 23 April 1977, Idle made another appearance on Saturday Night Live, with Neil Innes as a musical guest. A running theme for this episode was the "Save Great Britain Telethon", and it included an appearance by "the Rutle who lives in New York, Nasty". Innes appeared as Nasty with a lone white piano, singing a short version of "Cheese & Onions". Later in the episode, as Neil Innes, he performed "Shangri-La", a song subsequently recorded by the Rutles.

=== All You Need Is Cash, 1978 ===
Written by Idle and Innes, All You Need Is Cash documents the rise and fall of the Rutles, paralleling much of the history of the Beatles. The project was given extra recognition through Harrison's support; as well as providing ideas, he supplied Idle and Innes with a copy of the Beatles' long-planned documentary, The Long and Winding Road (eventually re-titled The Beatles Anthology and released in 1995). Idle drew inspiration from this 1976 version of the documentary, as compiled by Neil Aspinall, and was granted permission to use some of the archival footage to tell the Rutles' story.

Innes wrote, composed, and produced the music. He relied on his memory of Beatles music, and not careful later analysis, to create sound-alike songs. Innes assembled a band (himself, John Halsey, Ollie Halsall, Andy Brown, and Ricky Fataar) and the group played in a London pub to gel. During Rutles performances and studio recordings, Innes took lead on the songs that resembled Lennon's; Halsall sang on most McCartney-esque tunes; Fataar sang the Harrison songs; and Halsey sang a Ringo Starr-type song. Idle mimed to Halsall's singing and Brown's bass playing in the completed film. Halsall appeared in the film as "Leppo", the fifth Rutle who in the earliest years "mainly stood at the back". Brown did not appear in the film.

The film is a series of skits and gags that illustrate the Rutles story, following the chronology of the Beatles. The glue of the film is the soundtrack by Innes, who wrote and composed 19 more songs for the film, each a pastiche of a Beatles song or genre. Fourteen songs were on a soundtrack album. The CD version added the six songs omitted from the original vinyl album. The 2018 vinyl reissue contains the original 14-song configuration and includes a bonus EP containing the 6 extra songs (interestingly, due to its purchase by Warner Bros., the reissue came out on the Parlophone label, the label the Beatles originally were publishing on). The album was nominated for a Grammy award for Best Comedy Recording of the year. The orchestrations and arrangements were by film composer John Altman, and it was recorded and mixed by Steve James.

All You Need Is Cash was not a success on American television on its first showing on 22 March 1978, finishing at the bottom of all programs that week. The show fared better on BBC television when it premiered a week later, on 27 March 1978.

A 66-minute version was edited for TV and was released on video and DVD, but this has been superseded by the restored 72-minute version.

Additional actors in the special include Dan Aykroyd as the man who turned down the Rutles, John Belushi as Ron Decline (a parody of Allen Klein), Bill Murray as "Bill Murray the K", Gilda Radner as a reluctant street interviewee, George Harrison as a TV reporter, Mick Jagger and Paul Simon as themselves, Michael Palin as Eric Manchester (a parody of Beatles press agent Derek Taylor), Ron Wood as a biker, Lorne Michaels as a man who wants to merchandise the Rutles, Al Franken and Tom Davis as Ron Decline employees, and many others. It includes actual footage of David Frost and Ed Sullivan taken from TV appearances.

=== The Beatles' reaction ===
- George Harrison was involved in the project from the beginning. Producer Gary Weis said: "We were sitting around in Eric's kitchen one day, planning a sequence that really ripped into the mythology and George looked up and said, 'We were the Beatles, you know!' Then he shook his head and said, 'Aw, never mind.' I think he was the only one of the Beatles who really could see the irony of it all." Harrison said: "The Rutles sort of liberated me from the Beatles in a way. It was the only thing I saw of those Beatles television shows they made. It was actually the best, funniest and most scathing. But at the same time, it was done with the most love."
- Ringo Starr liked the happier scenes in the film, but felt the scenes that mimicked sadder times hit too close.
- John Lennon loved the film and refused to return the videotape and soundtrack he was given for approval. He told Innes, however, that "Get Up and Go" was too close to the Beatles' "Get Back" and to be careful not to be sued by ATV Music, owners of the Beatles catalogue copyright at the time. The song was consequently omitted from the 1978 vinyl LP soundtrack.
- Paul McCartney, who had just released his own album London Town, always answered "No comment." According to Innes: "He had a dinner at some awards thing at the same table as Eric one night and Eric said it was a little frosty." Idle claimed that McCartney changed his mind because his wife Linda thought it was funny. McCartney also warmed up to the film when he learned that Idle was from Wallasey, opposite Liverpool. According to Idle, he said: "Hey, Linda, it's okay, he's a Scouse, he's one of us!"

Idle claims on the All You Need Is Cash DVD commentary track that Harrison and Starr at one point discussed starting a band with Innes and Idle, based on the Beatles' and Rutles' shared and imaginary histories. Harrison and Starr also surprised him and Innes one day by singing a version of the Rutles' "Ouch!"

=== Later history ===
In 1979, Idle and Fataar issued a single as "Dirk and Stig"—"Ging Gang Goolie" backed with "Mr. Sheene". This was Idle's only appearance on a Rutles-related disc. There were no Rutles projects throughout the 1980s.

In 1982, the Rutles were involved in a record scandal reminiscent of the one surrounding the Beatles' Yesterday and Today album. Rhino Records, at the time a small Los Angeles label specialising in offbeat releases, released an album that it called Beatlesongs, purportedly a collection of Beatles novelty songs but actually a weird catch-all of assorted Beatles-related tunes. For the collection, Rhino licensed the Rutles' "Hold My Hand" from Warner Bros Records. The cover of the album was done by well-known commercial artist William Stout, who had made a name for himself drawing the cover artwork for some of the best-looking Beatles bootleg records in the 1970s. His cover drawing included a representation of Mark Chapman, the man who had killed John Lennon. The ensuing uproar prompted Rhino to reissue the album with a new cover featuring a photograph of Beatles memorabilia, claiming that Stout refused to amend his work.

A clip from All You Need Is Cash appeared on a VHS compilation tape of comedy videos put out by the now-defunct Vestron Home Video in 1985. The clip is simply the Tragical History Tour part of All You Need Is Cash, with the sound clunkily muted out during the segment's narration in order to leave just the music. This home video was released on both VHS and Laserdisc.

Innes, with a group called the Moptops backed by the 'Rutland Symphony Orchestra', performed as "Ron Nasty and the New Rutles" at a convention honouring the 25th anniversary of Monty Python in 1994. This led to a Rutles reunion album in 1996, featuring Innes, Fataar and Halsey. Halsall died in 1992, but the reunion album, titled Archaeology as a play on the Beatles' Anthology series, featured several tracks recorded in 1978 that included his contributions. The Japanese version included four bonus tracks.

In 2000, Idle released Eric Idle Sings Monty Python, a live concert album in which he performs "I Must Be in Love" as Sir Dirk McQuickly.

In 2002, Idle made The Rutles 2: Can't Buy Me Lunch, which remained unreleased for a year. The film employs unused footage from the previous Rutles film, and features an even bigger number of celebrity interviews discussing the band's influence. This was met with mixed reactions from fans, particularly because no new footage of the Rutles was filmed.

McQuickly and Nasty have cameos in the 2004 graphic novel, Superman: True Brit, co-written by former Monty Python's Flying Circus member John Cleese.

In 2007, a reissue of Archaeology included a new Rutles track called "Rut-a-lot" (a jab at Idle's stage show Spamalot) which is simply a live medley of songs from the first Rutles album.

On 17 March 2008, all four movie Rutles (Innes, Idle, Fataar and Halsey) reunited for the first time at a 30th anniversary screening of All You Need Is Cash at the Egyptian Theatre in Hollywood. The event included a question and answer session and performance by members of the tribute show "Rutlemania" which ran for a week at the Ricardo Montalbán Theatre in Hollywood before doing a week in NYC at the Blender Gramercy Theater. The "Rutlemania" live show was conceived and written by Eric Idle which starred the Beatles tribute group the Fab Four as "The Pre-Fab Four" Rutles.

In February 2009, on his website InnesBookOfRecords.Com, Innes released what he referred to as "Ron Nasty's Final Song", titled "Imitation Song", a parody of "Imagine". This was also Innes's first and only entry in the Masters of Song-Fu competition run by Quick Stop Entertainment.

On 9 February 2014, Idle reprised his narrator persona from All You Need Is Cash as part of The Night That Changed America: A Grammy Salute to The Beatles, noting how the Rutles had made their American debut 50 years earlier, and it was an amazing coincidence the Beatles were there the same day. He then lent straight narration to biographical sketches of the Beatles' early lives.

On 29 December 2019, Innes died of a heart attack at the age of 75, and the Rutles disbanded shortly afterwards. In his final interview before his death, Innes expressed enthusiasm about either a late 2019 U.S. tour or a 2020 spring tour for the Rutles.

== Personnel ==
=== On-screen lineup – Rutland Weekend Television ===
- Neil Innes – Nasty (Lennon)
- David Battley – Stig (McCartney)
- Eric Idle – Dirk (Harrison)
- John Halsey – Barry (Starr)

=== On-screen lineup – All You Need Is Cash ===
- Neil Innes – Ron Nasty (Lennon)
- Eric Idle – Dirk McQuickly (McCartney)
- Ricky Fataar – Stig O'Hara (Harrison)
- John Halsey – Barry Wom (real name Barrington Womble) (Starr)

=== On-record lineup – All You Need Is Cash ===
- Neil Innes – vocals, keyboards, guitars
- Ollie Halsall – vocals, guitars, keyboards
- Ricky Fataar – guitars, bass guitar, vocals, sitar, tabla
- John Halsey – drums, percussion, vocals
- Andy Brown – bass guitar

=== Archaeology ===
- Neil Innes – vocals, guitars
- Ollie Halsall – vocals, guitars (archival recordings)
- Ricky Fataar – vocals, guitars, drums
- John Halsey – vocals, drums

Additional musicians

- Mickey Simmonds – keyboards
- Malcolm Foster – bass guitar
- Doug Boyle – guitars
- Bernie Holland – guitars

=== Subsequent touring band members (2001–2019) ===
- Neil Innes – piano, guitar, ukulele, vocals
- John Halsey – drums, vocals, paper tearing
- Mark Griffiths – bass guitar, vocals (2001-2015)
- Mickey Simmonds – keyboards, vocals (2001-2014)
- Ken Thornton – lead guitar, vocals, drums (2001-2019)
- Steve Simpson – guitar, vocals (2001)
- Jason Bruer – saxophone (2001)
- Jason McDermid – trumpet (2001)
- J.J. Jones – percussion (2004-2005)
- Andy Roberts – guitar, vocals (2004)
- Elliot Randall – guitar (2015)
- Phil Jackson – keyboards, vocals, percussion (2015-2019)
- Jay Goodrich – bass guitar, vocals (2015-2018)
- David Catlin-Birch – bass guitar, vocals (2019)

== Discography ==
=== Albums ===
| Year | Album details |
|---|---|
| 1978 | The Rutles: Released: March 1978; Label: Warner Bros. Records (HS 3151); Formats: LP, Cassette, 8-Track, CD |
| 1996 | Archaeology: Released: 29 October 1996; Label:EMI (UK), Virgin Records (US); Formats: LP, Cassette, CD |
| 2014 | Live + Raw: Released: 2014; Label: East Central One (INNESCD2); Format: CD |
| 2018 | The Wheat Album: Released: 2018; Label: Neil Innes Music Ltd; Format: CD |

== Lawsuits ==
Following the release of the 1978 the Rutles album, ATV Music, the then-owner of the publishing rights to the Beatles catalogue sued Innes for copyright infringement. Though Innes hired a musicologist to defend the originality of his songs, he settled with ATV out of court for 50% of the royalties on the 14 songs included on the album. The settlement did not include any other Rutles songs which were not on the original LP release (some of which were included in the television film, e.g., "Baby Let Me Be", "Between Us", "Blue Suede Schubert", "Get Up And Go", "Goose Step Mama", and "It's Looking Good"); Innes retained 100% royalties to these. On actual Rutles releases, LP, CD, etc., writing credit for all songs has always been printed as Neil Innes only.

== See also ==
- Deface the Music – a similar Beatles parody by the group Utopia
- Beatallica – a Beatles and Metallica parody band
- The Punkles – German punk band inspired by the Beatles
- The Monkees – American pop rock band inspired by the Beatles
- The Rattles – German band with a 1966 Beatlesesque comedy/music film
- This Is Spinal Tap – a similar music-themed mockumentary
