= Boxer (band) =

British rock band

- Origin: London, England
- Genres: Rock
- Years active: 1975–1979
- Label: Virgin Records
- Past members: Mike Patto; Ollie Halsall; Chris Stainton; Keith Ellis; Tony Newman; Tim Bogert; Eddie Tuduri; Adrian Fisher; Boz Burrell; Bobby Tench; Tim Hinkley

Boxer were a rock band formed by singer and keyboardist Mike Patto and guitarist Ollie Halsall in 1975. They signed to Virgin and three albums followed, Below the Belt (1975), Absolutely (1977) and Bloodletting (1979), which also featured Bobby Tench and Boz Burrell. The band dissolved after Absolutely when Patto became ill.

The band was managed by Nigel Thomas who secured a five-album deal over five years with CBS, reputed to have been worth £1.2million, and was never fully executed due to Patto's death on 4 March 1979. During a six-year period, Boxer also toured the US and Europe.

== Discography ==
- Below the Belt (1975)
- Absolutely (1977)
- Bloodletting (1979)
- Heat on the Street EP with Crawler and Moon - promotional record given away free during 1977 UK tour
