= John Halsey (musician) =

Musical artist (born 1945)

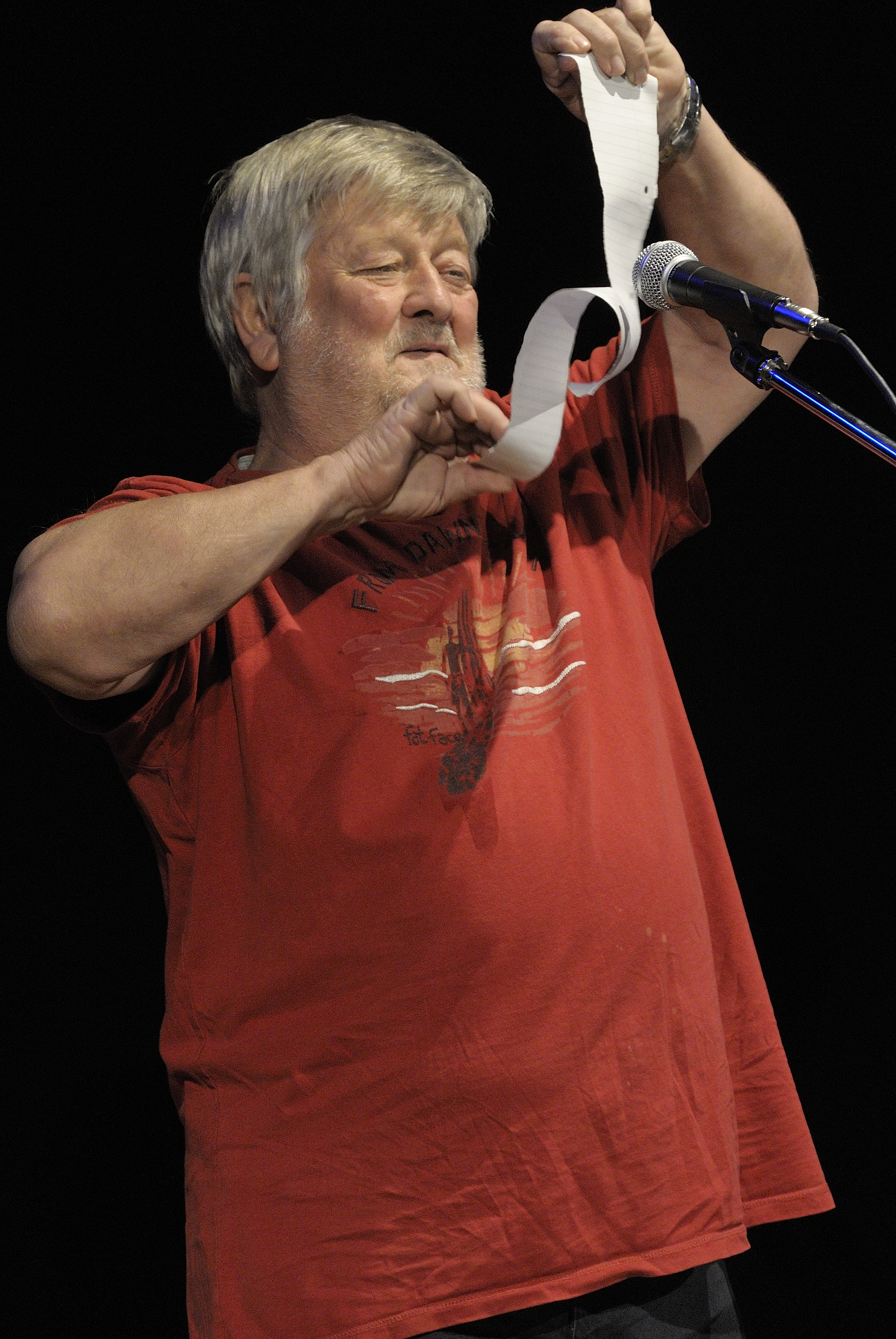
- Halsey in 2014

Background information
- Also known as: The Admiral
- Born: 23 February 1945 (age 81); Highgate, London, England
- Origin: Finchley, London, England
- Occupations: Publican; musician
- Instruments: Drums; vocals
- Years active: 1965–present
- Formerly of: Timebox, Patto, The Rutles

John Halsey (born 23 February 1945 (Note: Although 1945 is the birthyear often associated with Halsey, in this 1992 - interview https://www.olliehalsall.co.uk/admiral.htm - he mentions that he is fifty, implying he was born in 1942: "I'd love to play some more. I mean, when do you lose the urge? When do you want to stop? I'm 50 now and I still want to do it.")) is an English rock drummer, best known for his appearance in the television film All You Need is Cash (1978) as Barrington Womble ("Barry Wom") of The Rutles. Previous to this he had played with fellow future Rutle Neil Innes's band Fatso and appeared with them in the BBC Television comedy series, Rutland Weekend Television, fronted by a third Rutle, Eric Idle. Halsey is also known for his session work.

== Early life ==
Halsey was born in Highgate, North London, and grew up in North Finchley.

== Career ==
=== Early career ===
Halsey started drumming in 1958 or 1959, when two friends of his formed a group. He originally wanted to play bass, and even owned many bass-related catalogues including Höfner, and one day, his mother told him she would buy a bass if ever she saw one on for sale. One day however, she returned home and told Halsey she had seen a drum kit for sale, and asked him if he wanted it. Halsey would take the offer, but only because his best friend, Peter Rettig, whose older brother Roger was already playing drums in a local band called The Black Diamonds.

Halsey would learn how to play the drums by playing along to rock and roll acts such as Jerry Lee Lewis, Gene Vincent and Jimmy Guiffre's Trio.

Halsey started his career playing drums in local bands, his first being Barry Reed & The Avengers in 1962. His first professional band was Felder's Orioles. Felder's Orioles released four singles on the Piccadilly Records label.

=== Timebox and Patto ===
In 1967, Halsey placed an advertisement of himself in the "Musicians Avaliable" column of an issue of Melody Maker. This was eventually seen and answered by Timebox, a band from Southport, who Halsey who then join.

In 1968, the band had a minor hit with a cover of The Four Seasons' "Beggin'", which peaked at number 38 in the UK charts. In 1970, Timebox disbanded, and Halsey, with three other members from Timebox including Mike Patto, formed the progressive rock band Patto. With record producer Muff Winwood they released three albums. The band disbanded in 1973.

=== The Rutles ===
Halsey was a member of The Rutles, a parody group of The Beatles. In it, he portrayed the fictional drummer, Barry Wom (based on Ringo Starr). The Rutles were foreshadowed in episode 3 of Eric Idle's 1975 BBC television series Rutland Weekend Television. He portrayed Wom from 1975 to 1978, and again briefly from 1996 to 1997, and finally from 2002 to its end in 2019.

He appeared on the Channel 4 show What The Pythons Did Next on 1 January 2007, discussing what it was like to work with Eric Idle. In April 2008, he appeared at the Rutles' 30th anniversary reunion in Los Angeles, where the four original band members played together again.

=== Other works ===
In 1972, Halsey played drums on the Lou Reed album Transformer and recorded as a session musician on albums including Mind Your Own Business by Henry McCullough (1975), Back to the Night by Joan Armatrading (1975), Bullinamingvase by Roy Harper (1977), Woman in the Wings by Maddy Prior (1978), and Mail Order Magic by Roger Chapman (1980). He also toured with artists including Joe Cocker, The Scaffold, Grimms, Chris Jagger, Neil Innes, Viv Stanshall, and Joe Brown.

He remains musically active, playing drums and singing with the Peg Leg Pub Band, a nine-piece ensemble he formed in the summer of 2022. Other members of the Peg Leg Pub Band include, Andy Holland (guitar and vocals), John Clark (guitar and vocals), Garry Neale (banjo, accordion and vocals), Sid Sidholm (harmonica), Ray Perkins (guitar, ukulele, kazoo, swanee whistle, stoneware jug and vocals), Eric Haynes (bass, mandolin and vocals), Chris Skilton (guitar and vocals) and Lucy Hall (guitar, bass, and vocals).

In 2023, Halsey released his first ever piece of solo work, a single titled "Out of Town", and in 2025, he followed up with the release of his debut solo album, Songs of the Donkey Shed. In November 2025, he released his second single, a Christmas song called "Don't Knock The Pudding".

== Personal life ==
In an interview for the magazine Ptolemaic Terrascope in 1992, he said that he spent much of the 1980s selling fish from the back of a van after a near-fatal accident in Chichester in 1983 and that since then, he has been in the pub trade. From 1996, he has been the landlord of the Castle Inn public house in Castle Street, Cambridge.

== Discography ==
=== Groups ===
- Patto – Patto (1970)
- Hold Your Fire – Patto (1971)
- Roll 'em Smoke 'em Put Another Line Out – Patto (1972)
- The Rutles – The Rutles (1978)
- Archaeology – The Rutles (1996)
- Warts and All – Patto (2000)
- Monkey's Bum – Patto (2017)

=== Solo ===
==== Singles ====
Title	Year	Notes
"Out of Town"	2023	
"Don't Knock The Pudding"	2025	

==== Albums ====
Title	Year	Notes
Songs of the Donkey Shed	2025	
