= Timebox (band) =

English psychedelic pop band

- Origin: Southport, England
- Genres: Psychedelic pop; freakbeat
- Years active: 1965–1970
- Labels: Pye, Piccadilly Records, Deram
- Past members: Ollie Halsall; Clive Griffiths; Chris Holmes; Kevan Fogarty; Geoff Dean; Richard Henry; Andy Petre; Mike Patto; John Halsey

Timebox was an English 1960s psychedelic pop band. They formed in October 1965 in Southport, Lancashire and were closely linked to the mod scene.

== Career ==
Originally named 'The Take 5', they formed in 1965 in Southport, with the following members:

- Ollie Halsall – vibraphone, guitar
- Chris Holmes – piano, organ
- Kevan Fogarty – lead guitar and vocals
- Clive Griffiths – bass
- Geoff Dean – drums

The band turned professional and went to London in October 1966. They were soon working on package tours with The Kinks, The Small Faces, Tommy Quickly, and Lou Christie, as well as having a residency at the Whisky a Go Go. They then added the US singer Richard Henry, and the band changed their name to Timebox, an American term for a prison cell. Signed to Piccadilly Records in February 1967, their debut single, "I'll Always Love You" / "Save Your Love", produced by John Schroeder, was released.

Following this, Henry returned to the United States; and drummer Geoff Dean contracted tuberculosis to be replaced by Andy Petre. That April, the instrumental single "Soul Sauce" / "I Wish I Could Jerk Like My Uncle Cyril" was released. Mike Patto then joined the band, and took on a prominent role as vocalist and songwriter. When Petre quit, the drum stool was filled by John Halsey.

They recorded two singles for Piccadilly, before signing to Deram in 1967. They recorded five singles for Deram between 1967 and 1969, and appeared on BBC shows such as Colour Me Pop, Noise at Nine, Stuart Henry on Sunday and Jimmy Young. Their only UK Singles Chart entry was with their cover version of The Four Seasons' track, "Beggin'", which was produced by Michael Aldred and peaked at #38 in July 1968. After their last single failed in 1970, Chris Holmes left (he later joined Babe Ruth), and the remaining members Patto, Halsey, Halsall and Griffths continued under the name Patto.

The band also appeared in the opening scene of the 1968 film The Big Switch, billed in the opening credits as The Timebox.

== Discography ==
=== Singles ===
- "I Will Always Love You" / "Save Your Love" (1967, Piccadilly)
- "Soul Sauce" / "I Wish I Could Jerk Like My Uncle Cyril" (1967, Piccadilly)
- "Don't Make Promises" / "Walking Through the Streets of My Mind" (1967, Deram)
- "Beggin'" / "A Woman That's Waiting" (1968, Deram)
- "Girl Don't Make Me Wait" / "Gone Is the Sad Man" (1968, Deram), which appeared on Nuggets II
- "You Better Run" (45) (1968, Deram)
- "Baked Jam Roll in Your Eye" / "Poor Little Heartbreaker" (1969, Deram)
- "Yellow Van" / "You've Got the Chance" (1969, Deram)

=== Albums ===
- The Original Moose on the Loose (1976, Cosmos)
- The Deram Anthology (1998, Deram) (compilation album)
- Beggin' (2008, RPM) (compilation album)
