= Ollie Halsall =

English guitarist (1949–1992)

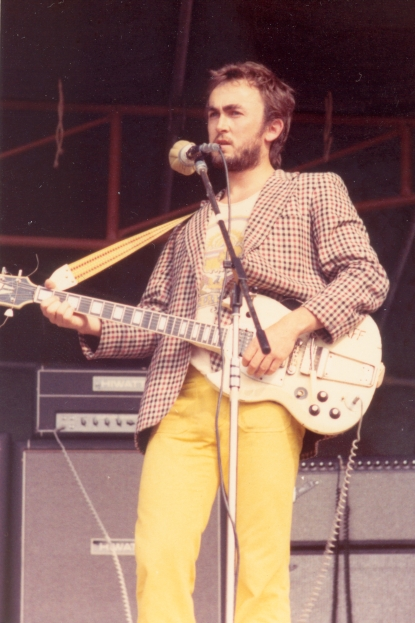
- Halsall performing at Hyde Park, London, 1974

Background information
- Born: Peter John Halsall; 14 March 1949; Southport, Lancashire, England
- Died: 29 May 1992 (aged 43) Madrid, Spain
- Genres: Pop; rock; progressive rock; synth-pop
- Occupations: Musician; songwriter; singer
- Instruments: Guitar; vibraphone; keyboards; bass; drums; vocals
- Years active: 1966–1992
- Labels: Virgin; Epic
- Formerly of: Patto; Timebox; Boxer; Cinemaspop
- Website: olliehalsall.co.uk

Peter John "Ollie" Halsall (14 March 1949 – 29 May 1992) was an English guitarist, songwriter, and singer, best known for his role in the Rutles, the bands Patto, Timebox, and Boxer, and for his contribution to the music of Kevin Ayers. He is also notable as one of the few players of the vibraphone in rock music. He was known by his childhood nickname "Olly" or "Ollie" which was simply a corruption of his surname. The Ollie Halsall Archive was established in 1998, with the aim of documenting and promoting his work.

== Career ==
Halsall began his musical career in 1964 playing drums with various local bands such as Pete and the Pawnees, the Gunslingers, the Music Students and Rhythm and Blues Incorporated. In 1965 he taught himself to play the vibraphone and was invited to London to join fellow Southport musicians bassist Clive Griffiths and keyboardist 'Professor' Chris Holmes in pop rock outfit Take Five, which became Timebox. in 1967, Halsall took up guitar. They enlisted Mike Patto on vocals and drummer "Admiral" John Halsey.

In 1970, following the departure of Holmes, Timebox evolved into the progressive rock band Patto, featuring Halsall on both guitar and vibraphone.

In 1973, Halsall left to join Jon Hiseman's Tempest. After less than a year, he quit and did numerous sessions, including a track for Kevin Ayers which led to a permanent position in Ayers' band the Soporifics. He was briefly considered as a possible replacement for Mick Taylor following the latter's departure from the Rolling Stones.

His UK session work included concerts and recordings with the Scaffold, Grimms, Neil Innes, Centipede, Andy Roberts, Mike de Albuquerque, John Otway, John Cale and Vivian Stanshall.

In 1975, Patto staged a brief reunion comprising just three benefit gigs. The reuniting of Halsall and Patto sparked the formation of Boxer during 1975. They released two albums on the Virgin record label before Patto died of lymphoid leukemia in 1979, and one posthumous album following that.

Halsall's most commercially successful recording is his work on the album The Rutles (1978), which reached the top 20 in the UK, on which he plays many of the instruments and provides lead and backing vocals – most notably on the tracks "Doubleback Alley", "With a Girl Like You" and "Get Up and Go". Eric Idle was cast in his place in the accompanying film and Halsall only featured in a very minor cameo role as Leppo, the fifth Rutle who got lost in Hamburg.

During 1976 Halsall had rejoined Ayers with whom he stayed for the next sixteen years. For much of that time he frequented the town of Deià in the north of the Spanish island of Mallorca, commuting to Madrid on the mainland to produce and play for numerous Spanish artists, including his final work with pop rock band Radio Futura.

In the 1980s he was, together with vocalist Zanna Gregmar, part of a Spanish synth-pop band, called Cinemaspop, created by Spanish producer Julián Ruiz. They released two studio albums – "Cinemaspop" (1983), just a collection of synth-pop covers of classical movie tunes, and "A Clockwork Orange" (1984) which included some compositions and vocals by Halsall, as well as a bizarre electronic version of the Troggs' "Wild Thing". In 1989, he replaced the ill Enrique Sierra in Radio Futura.

A finished solo album, produced by Robert Fripp, remains unreleased.

Halsall died from a drug-induced heart attack on 29 May 1992 at the age of 43 in Calle de la Amargura, Madrid, Spain.

== Legacy ==
Halsall has been described as an influence by Alvin Lee of Ten Years After, Bill Nelson of Be-Bop Deluxe, Allan Holdsworth, Kee Marcello of Europe and Cheap Trick's guitarist Rick Nielsen. XTC's Andy Partridge cites Halsall as one of his top three influences, saying "He made the guitar sound more like Albert Ayler or John Coltrane, more like a sort of fluid piano player."

== Discography ==
Solo work

- 1972 Ollie & The Blue Traffs (unreleased – produced by Robert Fripp)
- 1973 Rusty Strings (unreleased – produced by Muff Winwood)
- 1979 Caves (released in 2000; re-released as Lovers Leaping in 2021)

Group work

- 1967–69 The Deram Anthology (as Timebox – released 2000)
- 1970 Patto (as Patto)
- 1971 Hold Your Fire (as Patto)
- 1972 Roll Em, Smoke Em, Put Another Line Out (as Patto)
- 1973 Monkey's Bum (as Patto – released in 2017)
- 1973 Living in Fear (as Tempest)
- 1975 Below the Belt (as Boxer)
- 1978 The Rutles (as the Rutles)
- 1979 Bloodletting (as Boxer)
- 1983 Cinemaspop (as Cinemaspop)
- 1984 A Clockwork Orange (La Naranja Mecánica) (as Cinemaspop)
- 1990 Veneno en la piel (as Radio Futura)
- 1996 Archaeology (as the Rutles)
- 2000 Warts and All (as Patto – recorded live in 1971)
- 2007 Under the Blossom (Tempest Anthology)

with Kevin Ayers

- 1974 The Confessions of Dr. Dream and Other Stories
- 1974 June 1, 1974 (with Nico, John Cale and Brian Eno)
- 1975 Sweet Deceiver
- 1976 Yes We Have No Mañanas (So Get Your Mañanas Today)
- 1978 Rainbow Takeaway
- 1980 That's What You Get Babe
- 1983 Diamond Jack and the Queen of Pain
- 1984 Deià...Vu
- 1986 As Close as You Think
- 1988 Falling Up
- 1992 Still Life with Guitar
- 2017 The Happening Combo (with Lady June – recorded in the 1980s)

with Mike de Albuquerque

- 1973 We May Be Cattle But We've All Got Names
- 1976 Stalking the Sleeper

with John Halsey

- 1980 Abbots Langley (released in 2008)

with Neil Innes

- 1973 How Sweet to Be an Idiot
- 1982 Off the Record

with John Otway

- 1979 Where Did I Go Right?
- 2006 Scraps

with Terry Stamp

- 1975 Fatsticks

with Vivian Stanshall

- 1981 Teddy Boys Don't Knit
