= Mike Patto =

English musician (1942–1979)

- Also known as: Patto
- Born: Michael Thomas McCarthy; 22 September 1942; Cirencester, England
- Died: 4 March 1979 (aged 36)
- Genres: Progressive rock; pop
- Occupation: Singer
- Years active: 1962–1979
- Labels: Pye; Vertigo; Island; Deram
- Website: pattofan.com

Mike Patto (born Michael Thomas McCarthy, 22 September 1942 – 4 March 1979) was an English musician, who was primarily notable as lead singer for Spooky Tooth, Patto and Boxer.

== Background and career ==
Patto was born in Cirencester, Gloucestershire, but his family moved to Hingham, Norfolk, when he was a young child. Leaving school to become a garage mechanic in Watton, he set up his first band, a skiffle group named the Skyliners, with his brother Phil. After several years playing in a variety of bands, he became vocalist and frontman for The Bo Street Runners, who won a TV competition, Ready Steady Win, in 1964. He was then the lead singer of the group Chicago Line, aka The Chicago Line Blues Band. Other musicians included Tim Hinkley on keyboards, Ivan Zagni on guitar, Mike Fellana on trumpet, Louis Cennamo on bass and Viv Prince on drums. The group released a single, "Shimmy Shimmy Ko Ko Bop" bw "Jump Back" on Philips BF 1488 in May 1966.

In 1967, Patto joined the psychedelic pop band Timebox as a vocalist, which was where he met guitarist Ollie Halsall and drummer John Halsey, who would go on to be frequent collaborators of his. With Halsall, Halsey and bassist Clive Griffiths, Patto then set up his own band, Patto, which lasted for three years and four albums (one unreleased). In 1974, Patto joined Spooky Tooth as vocalist and keyboard player. He was also a founding member of the rock band Boxer with Halsall. In the mid-1970s, when Patto was ill with leukemia, he formed the informal "supergroup" Dick and the Firemen, which featured the likes of Halsey, Ronnie Wood, Boz Burrell and Henry McCullough.

== Death and legacy ==
Patto died of lymphatic leukemia at the age of 36. Jim Capaldi wrote the song "Bright Fighter" about him. His son Mike McCarthy is also a musician.
