= Wild Willy Barrett discography =

This is the discography of Wild Willy Barrett. It comprises a number of albums and singles.

== Discography ==
=== Albums ===
Name	Date	With
John Otway & Wild Willy Barrett	May 1977	John Otway
Deep & Meaningless	10 June 1978	John Otway
Call of the Wild	June 1979	N/A – Solo
Krazy Kong Album	30 June 1980	N/A – Solo
Way & Bar	August 1980	John Otway
Organic Bondage	May 1986	Stephen Two-Names
The Wimp & The Wild	August 1989	John Otway

=== Cassette tape albums ===
Name	Date	With
Black Cat Walking	June 1992	N/A – Solo

=== CD Albums ===
Name	Date	With
Open Toed and Flapping	February 1995	N/A – Solo
Mound of Sound	1997	N/A – Solo
Pure Willy	c. 2000	N/A – Solo
Gypsies Too	2002	Sleeping Dogz
Drum With No Ears	2004	Sleeping Dogz
Wildwood Traveller	3 February 2005	Mary Holland
One More For The Road	2010	Sleeping Dogz
The Recordings	12 April 2013	French Connection

=== Compilations ===
Date	Title	Extra	With
1981	Gone With The Bin	The Best Of Otway & Barrett	John Otway
2007	Judge And The Devil	an anthology 1968–2005	
2011	40 Odd Years	1971–2011	John Otway

=== Videos & DVDs ===
Date	Title	With
1990	Otway & Barrett Live	Jools Holland
2001	No Fuss, No Smell, No Mess	
2008	Strung Together - Live at the Ram Jam Club - Kingston upon Thames	John Otway

=== Appearances on compilations ===
Track(s)	Album title	Year
Amazing Grace	Country Roads To Turville Folk	1973
The Loneliness Of The Long Distance Guitarist; Hair Across The Frets	Guitar Workshop	1973
Nigel Pringle	Aylesbury Goes Flaccid	1978
Krazy Kong (Return of Kong)	The Transatlantic Story	1998

=== Singles ===
Date	A-Side	B-Side	With	Album
Apr 1973	Murder Man	If I Did	John Otway	
Apr 1975	Krazy Kong	Bus Shelter Reggae		Non-album Single
Oct 1976	Louisa on a Horse	Misty Mountain	John Otway	John Otway & Wild Willy Barrett
Aug 1977	Racing Cars	Running from the Law	John Otway	John Otway & Wild Willy Barrett
Nov 1977	Really Free	Beware of the Flowers	John Otway	John Otway & Wild Willy Barrett
Nov 1977	Return of Kong	Nice To Know You're My Friend		Non-album Single
Mar 1979	Let's Play Schools	I Did it Otway		Call Of The Wild
Apr 1980	Birthday Boy	What A Woman	John Otway	Way & Bar
Jun 1980	DK 50/80	"Homestead on the Farm" and "It's a Long Long Time Since I Heard Homestead on the Farm"	John Otway	Way & Bar
Jun 1980	A Shot of Redeye	I'm A Dog		Krazy Kong Album
Jan 1981	We've Got To Get Out of This Place	Barrett's Blues		Non-album singles
Feb 1981	Tales From the Raj	Drunks that Pass In The Night		Non-album singles
Aug 1981	I'm In Love Again	What You Gonna Do About It?		Non-album singles
Oct 1981	Headbutts	Headbutts (Live)	John Otway	I Did It Otway
Feb 1983	Old Joe Clarke	Rabbit In Boston		Non-album singles
Jul 1983	Rapping on a Mountain	Soundhog		Non-album singles
Apr 1985	Hitchhiker and the Punk	Jack 'O Diamonds		Organic Bondage
Oct 1987	The Last of the Mohicans	Fashion	John Otway	The Wimp & The Wild

== Production and session work ==
Artist	Album title	Year	Contribution/Role
Keith Hudson	Rasta Communication	1978	Hawaiian Guitar
Eddie Stanton	Please Don't Throw Me To The Christians (unfinished, unreleased)	1979- 1981	Production
Eddie Stanton	Lucifer Wants Me For A Sunbeam	1980	Production
Eddie Stanton	Milton Keynes We Love You	1981	Production
Tommy Keenan	Telling It Like It Is	1981	Production, Guitar, Fiddle
Vietnamese Rose	The Young and the Free	1982	Production
Vietnamese Rose	Curtains You	1982	Production
John Cadman	El Cad	1983	Production, Vocals
Wildman	Hear This!	1994	Banjo, Fiddle
Rolf Harris	Bohemian Rhapsody	1996	Fiddle
Aylesbury Music Centre	Armadillo - live at Pendley Court	1998	Production, Strings
George Hamilton IV	Treasures Untold	1999	Guitar, Mandolin, Fiddle
Deadfisch	God Bless America	2007	Songwriter
