= John Otway discography =

The discography of John Otway, an English singer-songwriter, consists of 13 albums, 30 singles and a number of compilation albums.

== Albums ==
Date	Title	With
1977	John Otway & Wild Willy Barrett	Wild Willy Barrett
1977	Live At The Roundhouse - 14/8/77	Wild Willy Barrett
1978	Deep & Meaningless	Wild Willy Barrett
1979	Where Did I Go Right?	
1980	Way & Bar	Wild Willy Barrett
1982	All Balls & No Willy	
1989	The Wimp & The Wild	Wild Willy Barrett
1991	Cheryl, a Rock Opera	Attila the Stockbroker
1992	Under the Covers and Over the Top	
1993	Live	The Big Band
1995	Premature Adulation	
2004	OT-AIR	
2006	Bunsen Burner - The Album	
2017	Montserrat	The Big Band
2019	John Otway & Wild Willy Barrett (Live to Disc)	Wild Willy Barrett

=== VHSs ===
Date	Title	With
late 80s	The Nearly Free Video E.P.	
1990	Otway & Barrett Live	Jools Holland
1994	Live at the Square	The Big Band
1997	The Really Free Show	The Big Band
	In Conversation With	
2002	The Abbey Road Video	The Big Band

=== Compilations ===
Date	Title	With
1980	Deep Thought	
1981	I Did It Otway	Wild Willy Barrett
1981	Gone with the Bin	Wild Willy Barrett
1986	Greatest Hits	
1990	Cor Baby, That's Really Me!	
1993	John Otway & Wild Willy Barrett + Deep & Meaningless	Wild Willy Barrett
1996	All Balls & No Willy + Where Did I Go Right?	
1998	Way & Bar + The Wimp & The Wild	Wild Willy Barrett
1998	Back From the Bin	
2000	The Set Remains the Same	The Big Band
2001	The Year of the Hit	
2002	Greatest Hits	
2006	Scraps	
2007	The Ultimate and Pen-Ultimate	
2007	The Patron Saint of Losers	
2011	40 Odd Years - 1971-2011	Wild Willy Barrett
2014	The Rest of Otway & Barrett	Wild Willy Barrett
2015	The Essentials	

=== DVDs ===
Date	Title	With
2004	Beware of the Flowers	The Big Band
2007	The Mad, the Bad & the Dangerous	The Hamsters; Wilko Johnson
2008	Strung Together - Live at the Ram; Jam Club - Kingston upon Thames	Wild Willy Barrett
2014	Rock And Roll's Greatest Failure: Otway The Movie	
2016	The Producer's Box (4 DVDs) (i) Rock And Roll's Greatest Failure: Otway The Movie (ii) Live: the Archive Footage (iii) Movie Extras (iv) John Otway & The Big Band At The Royal Albert Hall 30 October 1998	

=== Singles ===
Date	Title A-Side	B-Side	With
Sep 1972	Misty Mountain	Gypsy	
Apr 1973	Murder Man	If I Did	Wild Willy Barrett
Oct 1976	Louisa on a Horse	Misty Mountain	Wild Willy Barrett
Aug 1977	Racing Cars	Running from the Law	Wild Willy Barrett
Nov 1977	Really Free	Beware of the Flowers	Wild Willy Barrett
Mar 1978	Geneve	It's a Long Long Time Since; I Heard Homestead on the Farm	
Sep 1978	Baby's in the Club	Julie	
Mar 1979	Frightened and Scared	Are You on my Side	
Apr 1980	Birthday Boy	What A Woman	Wild Willy Barrett
Jun 1980	DK 50/80	Homestead on the Farm; It's a Long Long Time Since I Heard Homestead on the Farm	Wild Willy Barrett
Oct 1980	Green, Green Grass of Home	Wednesday Club	
Dec 1980	The John Otway EP: The Man Who Shot Liberty Valence	Birthday Boy; Racing Cars	
Apr 1981	The Turning Point	Too Much Air Not Enough Oxygen	
Oct 1981	Headbutts	Headbutts (live)	Wild Willy Barrett
Aug 1982	12 Stitch: Headbutts Jingle; Headbutts; Racing Cars Jingle	Headbutts (live at Capitol Radio); Best Dream Jingle; Auld Lang Sammy	Wild Willy Barrett
Oct 1982	In Dreams	You Ain't Seen Nothing Yet	
Apr 1983	Mass Communication	Baby It's the Real Thing	
Nov 1983	Middle of Winter	It Makes Me See Red	
Oct/Nov 86	The New Jerusalem	The Tyger	
Oct 1987	The Last of the Mohicans	Fashion	Wild Willy Barrett
Dec 1987	Johnny Japes and His Jesticles; Bags of Fun with Buster	Scrotal Scratch Mix	Andy Partridge and Dave Gregory (XTC)
Jan 1988	Whoops Apocalypse	Losing	
Oct 1991	Cheryl	Boys in the Hood	Attila the Stockbroker

=== CD singles ===
Date	Title	Tracks
Sep 1992		Two Little Boys; I Will Survive; Josephine; The Highwayman
Oct 1995	Delilah - The Otway Sings Jones E.P.	Delilah; It's Not Unusual; Green Green Grass of Home
1998	John Otway & The Aylesbury Youth Orchestra	Birthday Boy; The Highwayman; Geneve
2002	Abbey Road: Otway Sessions	Crazy Horses; Country Flowers; Really Free; The Man Who Shot Liberty Valance; Josephine; Day After Day
Sep 2002	Bunsen Burner	Bunsen Burner; House of the Rising Sun (Live at Abbey Road); A413 Revisited
Sep 2002	Bunsen Burner (Even Hotter Mix)	Bunsen Burner (Even Hotter Mix); Attractive to You; U R Breaking Up
Sep 2002	Bunsen Burner (it's Not a Mix, It's a Compound)	Bunsen Burner (it's Not a Mix, It's a Compound); Deep Blue Water; Bunsen Burner vs. Burning Love
2014	A John Otway Christmas	OK Father Christmas; Middle Of Winter (2014 New Version); Rocking With The Reindeer; The Snowflake Effect (2014 New Version)
