= Jack Monck =

British musician

Adam John Monck known as Jack (born 14 March 1950, London, England) is a British bass guitarist, songwriter and teacher.

Jack Monck started playing bass guitar in 1968 with the blues band Delivery with Steve Miller, Phil Miller and Pip Pyle, later joined by Lol Coxhill and Carol Grimes. The band toured UK playing their own gigs and backing Lowell Fulson, Otis Spann and Champion Jack Dupree among others.

In Cambridge in the early 1970s he played with Syd Barrett, Pink Fairies' drummer, Twink, Fred Frith and Chris Cutler of Henry Cow and co-formed Rocksoff who were a collective of songwriters. In London he played with Geoff Leigh and Radar Favourites, the Mike Khan band with guitarist John Roster, the Jon Owen Band (of Global Village Trucking Co) with drummer Eric Peachey, and in other bands in the London area. In 1978 he recorded some of his own songs with pianist Bill Gilliam and drummer Laurie Allan, and recorded more in 1983 with pianists Amy Chan, Sue Ellery, guitarist Paul Westwater and drummer Pip Pyle. Tracks from both sessions came out on Voiceprint CD Inside The Whale in 2002.

In 1982, he recorded tracks with David Thomas and the Pedestrians with Chris Cutler and reeds player Lindsay Cooper, which came out on the Rough Trade LP Variations on a Theme. In 1984, he participated in an extensive European tour with the band.

Monck started his own group That Uncertain Feeling in 1985, later the Chan/Monck Group with saxophonist Marc Hadley, and in 1988 co-formed the Relatives with Marc, pianist Willem Jan Droog and trombonist Kees Meijlink. The band toured and recorded in UK, Netherlands and Belgium until 1991. In East London he played with trombonist John Bennett and his band, trombonist Roland Bates and drummer Rick Bamford in Symphony Sid and trumpeter Loz Speyer in Don't Let That Horse Eat That Violin. In 1995 he co-formed Momo with percussionist/vocalist Lahcen Lahbib to play a dance-oriented Moroccan fusion. The band gigged extensively in London and UK and recorded 1998 CD Music4Senses. In 2000 the band played at WOMAD.

The Relatives re-formed in 2004 and continued touring in Holland and UK. The band released the Trans Europ Connection CD on Relatives Records in 2007 and in the next year a tour of Essex included a gig at Colchester Institute. In 2009 the Live in Rotterdam CD was recorded and released, and in 2010 on their summer tour of Holland, the band were joined by Phil Miller on guitar. In 2011, following another tour in Holland and an appearance with Marc Hadley's band at the Port Eliot festival in Cornwall, with drummer/bassist Damian Rodd, Monck and the band started work at Damian's studio in Falmouth on Virtually.......the Relatives and Phil Miller which was released in 2013 on Relatives Records.

In 2014, Monck started working on new music with Phil Miller, Marc Hadley and drummer Paul Dufour and, from 2015 to 2017, Jack Monck and Friends played a handful of gigs in Essex and London.

In 1999, Monck completed Access to Music's Instrumental Music Facilitator course and started teaching bass guitar at Colchester Institute where he remains up to the present day.
