= Krazy Kong Album =

Album by Wild Willy Barrett

Studio album by Wild Willy Barrett
- Released: 30 June 1980
- Recorded: 1971, July 1973, 1979
- Genre: Reggae, Folk
- Length: 35:13
- Label: Red Eye Records
- Producer: Wild Willy Barrett & Tony Atkins

Wild Willy Barrett chronology
Way & Bar (w/John Otway) (1980)	Krazy Kong Album (1980)	Organic Bondage (w/Stephen Two-Names) (1986)

Singles from Krazy Kong Album
- 1. "Return of Kong (Note: Titled Return of Kong but is actually the version of Krazy Kong as produced by Tony Atkins) / Bus Shelter Reggae (as Krazy Kong) Transatlantic Records" Released: 18 April 1975; 2. "Return of Kong (alternate) / Nice To Know You're My Friend Logo Records" Released: 25 November 1977; 3. "A Shot of Red Eye / I'm A Dog Red Eye Records" Released: 27 June 1980

Professional ratings
Review scores
Source	Rating
AllMusic	4/5 stars

The Krazy Kong Album is a 1980 album by Wild Willy Barrett and released on his own Red Eye Records. The songs are a collection of recordings made over a decade and are available here for the first time. The album is notable for being the first white reggae album recorded, years before Regatta de Blanc, with the title track as a prime example. 'Kong and the Soup Dragon' is a nod to the Clangers with whistles featured throughout.

== History ==
In 1973 Barrett was signed up to the Transatlantic record label and was featured on Guitar Workshop, a label sampler. Transatlantic had shown no big interest in Barrett until he visited their offices with the 'Krazy Kong' demo. After the label commissioned an album of Kong, and Barrett wrote 'Return of Kong' and 'Kong and the Soup Dragon', he entered the studio in July and recorded these plus three folk songs. However some of the songs were quite pastiche, namely I'm A Dog, and the tapes were shelved. In 1977 Barrett enjoyed a No. 27 chart flop with Otway and this reignited interest in Barrett; he recorded Call of the Wild in 1979, his last with Polydor. One year later and Barrett unshelves the tapes and, together with a recently recorded A-Side, mixes and releases the Krazy Kong Album.

The album and accompanying single "A Shot of Red Eye" were released during the Tent Tour.

== The Kongcept ==
The three Kong songs are actually a story with definitive parts and musical accompaniment.

The first; 'Krazy Kong', is played over a heavy jungle beat with a reggae back-beat. In this part Barrett begins the story and explains that Kong is somewhat of a newbie to the town and is known as a live-wire who is dodged by men, however young women have a penchant for him.

'Return of Kong' sees Kong seeking Barrett, who he meets whilst taking a late night walk. Barrett heads on home and, panicking, hears the door knock, he invites Kong in and strikes up a friendship. 'Return of Kong' is New Wave with a lighter reggae beat.

In 'Kong and the Soup Dragon' it is revealed that Kong is a successful man, has a big house and employs a Butler, Footman and Chambermaid. Kong has a space machine that he takes off with, thus leaving the earth and visiting what is assumed to be the Clangers' planet. The song is a pastiche of a children's TV theme with whistling and comic sound effects.

The character of Kong is a simple monkey-like creature who smokes cigars, is escorted by women whilst partying on a Friday and plays saxophone. He is quite volatile and talks in this 'Kong scat' which Barrett soon learns. Kong also owns a mansion and a spacemobile.

== Recording ==
The bulk of the album was recorded at Pro Musica Studios in Maidenhead July 1973. Transatlantic sent Willy in the studio with Tony Atkins, a fellow producer, but he and Barrett didn't see eye to eye. The demo of Krazy Kong had an epic saxophone solo by Coxhill but the version on the Krazy Kong single is apparently only half of the demo. Also recorded at Pro Musica were the rocker Can't See the Trees, a Mike Sammesesque version of Bluey Green, an alternative version of Return of Kong and Nice To Know You're My Friend. The latter two songs were released as a 7" after the success of Really Free. Drink To Me Only and One Leg Blues were performed live at Hinckley College in Oxford and A Shot of Redeye was recorded at Barrett's farm studio in Gawcott, just off Aylesbury. This would later become Barrett's Place where a vast quantity of Otway/Barrett music was recorded. The album was also mixed here.

== Promotion ==
The rare Logo Records Return of Kong 7". Note the alternate name "Willie" Barrett

The promotion for the album began in 1975 when Transatlantic released Krazy Kong backed with Bus Shelter Reggae. The single was put out in both England and France, although the French pressing has "Special Reggae" printed on the front. Although the album wasn't released for another six years, a second single surfaced on publisher's label Logo Records again featuring Return of Kong (a version different from the track on the album), the b-side being a non-album track; Nice to Know You're My Friend.

Once the album was mixed, the leading single was advertised in the Otway & Barrett tour book of the time. To advertise the album, Barrett placed an ad in the Melody Maker also featuring two Eddie Stanton singles. Stanton later wrote several of the songs on Barrett's next album, Organic Bondage and The Wimp & The Wild's "Focke Wolfe". All of Red Eye/Black Eye's releases were distributed by Spartan Records, an affiliate of Cherry Red. The album retailed at £3.99.

Several tracks from the album have been released recently; five on Barrett's Anthology and the alternative Return of Kong on The Transatlantic Story

== Track listing ==
All tracks are written by Wild Willy Barrett and Adam Francis

Side 1
No.	Title	Length
1.	"Krazy Kong"
2.	"Return of Kong"
3.	"I'm a Dog"
4.	"Bus Shelter Reagge"
5.	"Kong and the Soup Dragon"

Side 2
No.	Title	Writer(s)	Arranged by	Length
1.	"Me and the Devil"	Robert Johnson	Barrett
2.	"The Lambeth Trot"	Douglas Furber, Noel Gay
3.	"Drink To Me Only With Thine Eyes"		Barrett
4.	"One Leg Blues"	Barrett
5.	"Shot of Redeye"	Barrett

== Vinyl label errors ==
There are a number of errors printed on the label of the vinyl, namely track positions, writer credits and publishers
1 Written by Barrett
2-5 written by Francis/Barrett

1. Crazy Cool
2. Return of Kong
3. Bus Shelter Reggae
4. Kong & The Soup Dragon
5. I'm A Dog

1,5 Written by Barrett
2 Written by Furber/Gay
3 Traditional arranged by Barrett
4 Written by Francis/Barrett

1. One Leg Blues
2. The Lambeth Trot
3. Drink To Me Only With Thine Eyes
4. Me and the Devil
5. A Shot of Red Eye

== Personnel ==
- Wild Willy Barrett – vocals, guitar, violin, bass, banjo, keyboards, percussion
- Adam Francis – guitar on "Me and the Devil"
- Lol Coxhill – saxophone on "Krazy Kong"
- Mark Freeman – drums on "A Shot of Red Eye"

== The Krazy Songs ==
§	Note	Krazy Kong (75) (s)	Return of Kong (77) (s)	Shot of Redeye (80) (s)	Krazy Kong Album (a)
Krazy Kong	(d)				Track 1
Return of Kong	(d)				Track 2
I'm A Dog	(d)			Side B	Track 3
Bus Shelter Reggae	(d)				Track 4
Kong & The Soup Dragon	(d)				Track 5
Me and the Devil	(d)				Track 6
Lambeth Trot					Track 7
Drink To Me Only	(l)				Track 8
One Leg Blues	(l)				Track 9
Shot of Redeye				Side A	Track 10
Krazy Kong	(TA)	Side A			
Bus Shelter Reggae	(TA)	Side B			
Return of Kong	(TA)		Side A		
Nice To Know You're My Friend	(TA)		Side B		
Can't See the Trees	(u)				
Bluey Green	(u)				
Me and the Devil	(u) (TA)				

=== Legend ===
(s) = Single
(a) = Album
(d) = Demo
(l) = Live
(u) = Unreleased
(TA) = Produced by Tony Atkins
