= Lol Coxhill =

English free improvising saxophonist (1932–2012)

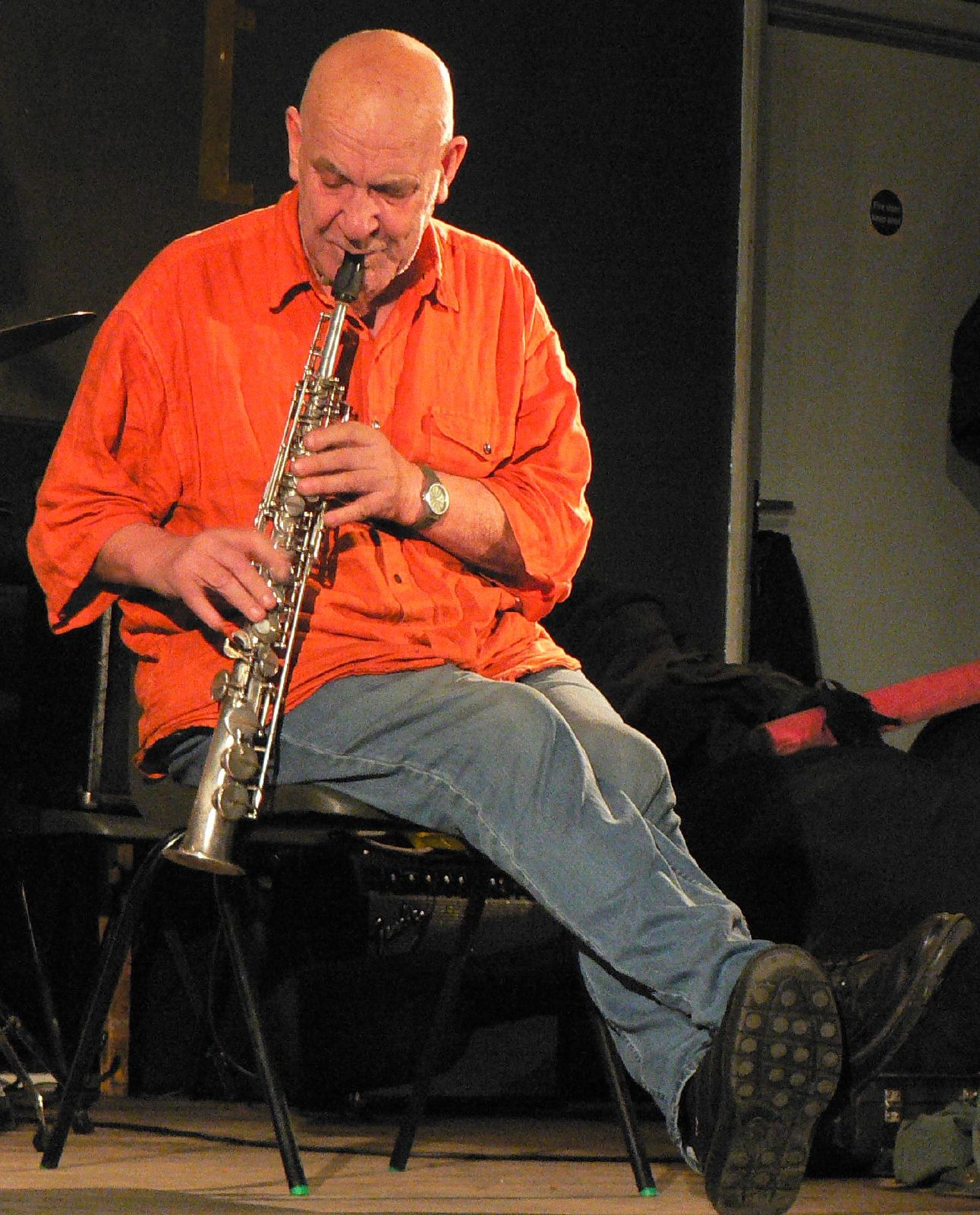
- Coxhill at the Red Rose Club in North London, 2007

Background information
- Born: George William Lowen Coxhill; 19 September 1932; Portsmouth, Hampshire, England
- Died: 10 July 2012 (aged 79) London, England
- Genres: Free improvisation
- Occupation: Musician
- Instruments: Soprano saxophone, sopranino saxophone

George Lowen Coxhill (19 September 1932 – 10 July 2012) known professionally as Lol Coxhill, was an English free improvising saxophonist. He played soprano and sopranino saxophone.

== Biography ==
Coxhill was born, to George Compton Coxhill and Mabel Margaret Coxhill (née Motton), in Portsmouth, Hampshire, England. He grew up in Aylesbury, Buckinghamshire, and bought his first saxophone in 1947. He originally trained as a bookbinder, and worked in a factory, until the mid-1960s.

After national service he became a busy semi-professional musician, touring US airbases with Denzil Bailey's Afro-Cubists and the Graham Fleming Combo. In the 1960s he played with visiting American blues, soul and jazz musicians including Rufus Thomas, Mose Allison, Otis Spann, and Champion Jack Dupree. He also developed his practice of playing unaccompanied solo saxophone, often busking in informal performance situations. Other than his solo playing, he performed mostly as a sideman or as an equal collaborator, rather than a conventional leader – there was no regular Lol Coxhill Trio or Quartet as would normally be expected of a saxophonist. Instead he had many intermittent but long-lasting collaborations with like-minded musicians.

In the late 1960s and early 1970s, he was a member of Canterbury scene bands Carol Grimes and Delivery and then Kevin Ayers and the Whole World.

He became known for his solo playing and for work in duets with pianist Steve Miller and guitarist G. F. Fitzgerald.

He was thought to have largely inspired Joni Mitchell's song "For Free", while busking solo on the old footbridge which formed part of the Hungerford Bridge between Waterloo and Charing Cross.

Coxhill collaborated with other musicians including Mike Oldfield, Morgan Fisher (of Mott the Hoople), Chris McGregor's Brotherhood of Breath and its musical descendant The Dedication Orchestra, Django Bates, the Damned, Hugh Metcalfe, Derek Bailey, Fred Frith and performance art group Welfare State.

He lived for a while in the Digswell Arts Trust in Welwyn Garden City and was a much liked member of the commune.

He often worked in small collaborative groups with semi-humorous names such as the Johnny Rondo Duo or Trio (with pianist Dave Holland – not the bassist of the same name), the Melody Four (characteristically a trio, with Tony Coe and Steve Beresford), and The Recedents (with guitarist Mike Cooper and percussionist Roger Turner), known as such because the members were (in Coxhill's words) "all bald", though the name may additionally be a play on the American band the Residents. Typically these bands performed a mix of free improvisation interspersed with ballroom dance tunes and popular songs. There was humour throughout his music but he sometimes felt it necessary to tell audiences that the free playing was not intended to be a joke.

Coxhill was compere and occasional performer at the Bracknell Jazz Festival, and a raconteur as well as a musician; he often would introduce his music by saying the words, "what I am about to play you may not understand". It was following a performance at Bracknell that he recorded the melodramatic monologue Murder in the Air.

His son Simon is a punk drummer who played with Acme Sewage Co. his daughter Claire is a vocalist and his daughter Maddie sings and plays in a ukulele band. All three children appear with their father on "I am the Walrus", one of the tracks on Ear of Beholder and later featured on The Exotic Beatles part 2.

On 26 July 2007, Coxhill married Ulrike Gertrud Scholz. They had been together since 1991. He died in London on 10 July 2012, aged 79. He had been seriously ill for about six months.

== Discography ==
- Ear of Beholder (Dandelion, 1971)
- Toverbal Sweet (Mushroom, 1972)
- Coxhill/Miller/Miller/Coxhill (Caroline, 1973)
- Welfare State & Lol Coxhill (Caroline, 1975)
- Fleas in Custard (Caroline, 1975)
- Diverse (Ogun, 1977)
- Lid (Ictus, 1978)
- The Joy of Paranoia (Ogun, 1978)
- Moot (Ictus, 1978)
- Digswell Duets (Random Radar, 1979)
- Slow Music (Pipe, 1980)
- Chantenay 80 (Nato, 1981)
- Instant Replay (Nato, 1983)
- French Gigs (AAA, 1983)
- The Dunois Solos (Nato, 1984)
- Cou$cou$ (Nato, 1984)
- The Inimitable (Chabada, 1985)
- 10:02 (Nato, 1985)
- Cafe De La Place (Nato, 1986)
- Frog Dance (Impetus, 1986)
- Before My Time (Chabada, 1987)
- Termite One (Bruce's Fingers, 1990)
- The Holywell Concert (Slam, 1990)
- Solo (Shock, 1990)
- Halim (Nato, 1993)
- Three Blokes (FMP, 1994)
- One Night in Glasgow (Scatter, 1995)
- Xmas Songs (Rectangle, 1998)
- Boundless (Emanem, 1998)
- Alone and Together (Emanem, 1999)
- Mouth (Fragile Noise, 2001)
- Worms Organising Archdukes (Emanem, 2002)
- Spectral Soprano (Emanem, 2002)
- Milwaukee 2002 (Emanem, 2003)
- Out to Launch (Emanem, 2003)
- Darkly (Ictus, 2006)
- Darkly Again (Ictus, 2006)
- More Together Than Alone (Emanem, 2007)
- The Early Years (Ping Pong, 2007)
- Fine Tuning (Amirani, 2010)
- Success with Your Dog (Emanem, 2010)
- The Rock On the Hill (Nato, 2011)
- Old Sights, New Sounds (Incus, 2011)
- Sitting On Your Stairs (Emanem, 2013)
- Morphometry (Glo-Spot, 2020)

=== As sideman ===
With Kevin Ayers

- Shooting at the Moon (Harvest, 1970)
- The Confessions of Dr. Dream and Other Stories (Island, 1974)
- Odd Ditties (Harvest, 1975)
- Singing the Bruise (Band of Joy, 1996)
- The Garden of Love (Voiceprint, 1997)
- Too Old to Die Young (Hux, 1998)
- Banana Follies (Hux, 1998)

=== As sideman/session player (partial list) ===
- 1971 No Roses – Shirley Collins and the Albion Country Band
- 1971 "Tokoloshe Man" – John Kongos
- 1972 Boo – Juliet Lawson (Sovereign Records)
- 1973 1984 – Hugh Hopper
- 1973 Lonely Street – Delroy Washington (Count Shelly Records) – sax accompaniment and solo
- 1974 The Confessions of Dr. Dream and Other Stories – Kevin Ayers
- 1975 The Death of Imagination – Penny Rimbaud (Red Herring Records)
- 1977 Music for Pleasure – The Damned
- 1980 Way & Bar – John Otway & Wild Willy Barrett
- 1980 Krazy Kong Album – Wild Willy Barrett – sax solo on title track
- 1982 The Flying Padovanis – Va Plus Haut – sax solo on the track
- 1983 It's All Done By Mirrors – The Astronauts

With Company

- Company 6 (Incus, 1978)
- Company 7 (Incus, 1978)
- Fictions (Incus, 1981)

With others

- Mick Audsley, Dark and Devil Waters (Sonet, 1973)
- Mick Audsley, Storyboard (Sonet, 1974)
- Heidi Berry, Love (4AD, 1991)
- Borah Bergman, Acts of Love (Mutable Music, 2005)
- Thomas Borgmann, Kith 'n Kin (Cadence, 1998)
- Caravan, Waterloo Lily (Deram, 1972)
- Andrea Centazzo, Situations (New Tone, 2000)
- Andrea Centazzo, Thirty Years from Monday (Ictus, 2006)
- Eugene Chadbourne, Jesse Helms Busted with Pornography (Fire Ant, 1996)
- Eugene Chadbourne, Psychad (Swamp Room, 1997)
- Shalom Chanoch, Shalom (DJM, 1971)
- Shirley Collins and The Albion Country Band, No Roses (Pegasus, 1971)
- Lindsay Cooper, Music from the Gold Diggers (Sync Pulse, 1983)
- Lindsay Cooper, Rags & the Golddiggers (ReR, 1991)
- Mike Cooper, Island Songs (Nato, 1996)
- Morgan Fisher, Claws Cherry (Red, 1980)
- Frank Chickens, We Are Frank Chickens (Kaz, 1984)
- The Flying Padovani's, Western Pasta (Demon, 1981)
- Carol Grimes, Fools Meeting (B&C, 1970)
- GP Hall, Figments of Imagination (FMR, 1996)
- George Haslam, Solos East West (Slam, 1997)
- George Haslam, From Whichford Hill (Slam, 2008)
- Charles Hayward, Mathilde 253 (Slam, 2011)
- Hugh Hopper, 1984 (CBS, 1973)
- John Kongos, Kongos (Fly, 1971)
- Alexis Korner, Bootleg Him! (Warner Bros., 1972)
- Alexis Korner, Both Sides (Castle Music, 2006)
- Phil Minton, My Chelsea (Rectangle, 2011)
- Tom Newman, Fine Old Tom (Virgin, 1975)
- John Otway & Wild Willy Barrett, Way & Bar (Polydor, 1980)
- Playgroup, Epic Sound Battles Chapter Two Cherry (Red, 1983)
- Penny Rimbaud, The Death of Imagination ((Red, Herring, 2001)
- Paul Rutherford, Chicago 2002 (Emanem, 2002)
- Second Hand, Death May Be Your Santa Claus (See for Miles, 1997)
- Spontaneous Music Ensemble, Trio/Triangle (Emanem, 2008)
- John Stevens, A Luta Continua (Konnex, 1994)
- David Toop, Black Chamber (Sub Rosa, 2003)
- Ultramarine, Hymn Remixes (Blanco y Negro, 1994)
- Gary Windo, His Master's Bones (Cuneiform, 1996)
- Trevor Watts, Trevor Watts' Moire (Music Arc, 1985)
- Robert Wyatt, Flotsam Jetsam (Rough Trade, 1994)

== Filmography ==
- Hospital patient in Stephen Frears's Walter, 1982, Central Independent Television
- Frogdance, a documentary about Coxhill, was shown by Channel 4 (1987)
- Appearance as a butler in Sally Potter's 1992 film Orlando
- Cameo appearance in the season-five episode "A Much Underestimated Man" of the TV detective series Strangers (a precursor to the series Bulman)
- Appearance as a priest in Derek Jarman's 1986 film Caravaggio
- Appearance as a priest in Fhiona Louise's 1989 film Cold Light of Day
