= Delivery (British band) =

British prog rock band

- Also known as: Bruno's Blues Band
- Genre: Blues/progressive rock
- Years active: 1966-1971, 1972
- Past members: Phil Miller; Steve Miller; Jack Monck; Lol Coxhill; Pip Pyle; Laurie Allan; Carol Grimes; Roy Babbington

Delivery was a British blues/progressive rock musical group, formed in the late 1960s. The band was one of the wellsprings of the progressive rock Canterbury scene.

== Career ==
Founded in 1966 as Bruno's Blues Band by guitarist Phil Miller, his elder brother pianist Steve Miller, drummer Pip Pyle and bassist Jack Monck, the band gigged around London for a few years. In 1968, saxophonist Lol Coxhill joined them, and the band's name was changed to Steve Miller's Delivery. In 1969, the band teamed up with blues singer Carol Grimes and bassist Roy Babbington replaced Monck. The resulting line-up recorded and released one album: Fools Meeting. Although Grimes wanted to appear as a band member, the record company released the album under "Carol Grimes and Delivery". In 1971, Pyle left the band to join Gong and was replaced by Laurie Allan (who would himself also later join Gong). They disbanded shortly thereafter.

Phil Miller went on to found Matching Mole with Robert Wyatt and Dave Sinclair, but a new Delivery line-up was assembled in early 1972, consisting of the Miller brothers, Pyle and Richard Sinclair (bass and vocals), then Steve Miller's bandmate in Caravan. The band played a few live shows in August/September that year, but with Steve Miller being replaced by Dave Sinclair (from Matching Mole and Caravan), the band changed its name to Hatfield and the North. A final Delivery performance took place in November 1972 for the BBC's Radio One in Concert series, with an unusual line-up bringing together the Miller brothers, Pyle, Babbington, Coxhill, and Sinclair (who provided only vocals).

Steve Miller went on to release two shared (rather than "duo") albums with Coxhill for Virgin's Caroline budget label in 1973/74.

Roy Babbington, who had played with the Keith Tippett Group and Nucleus in 1971–73, went on to join Soft Machine from 1973 to 1976. Laurie Allan rejoined Gong a couple of times, most notably appearing on 1973's Flying Teapot, and later Barbara Thompson's Paraphernalia.

== Discography ==
- Fools Meeting (album, as "Carol Grimes and Delivery"), 1970
- "Harry Lucky" / "Home Made Ruin" (single), 1970

== Filmography ==
- 2015: Romantic Warriors III: Canterbury Tales (DVD)
