= Where Did I Go Right? =

Studio album by John Otway
- Released: May 13, 1979
- Recorded: Early 1979
- Studio: Chappell Studios, New Bond Street, London
- Label: Polydor
- Producer: Neil Innes; Steve James

John Otway chronology
Deep & Meaningless (1978)	Where Did I Go Right? (1979)	Way & Bar (1980)

Singles from Did I Go Right?
- 1. "Frightened and Scared" / "Are You On My Side?" Released: March 1979

Professional ratings
Review scores
Source	Rating
AllMusic	1.5/5 stars
The Encyclopedia of Popular Music	3/5 stars
The Rolling Stone Album Guide	2/5 stars

Where Did I Go Right? is English singer-songwriter John Otway's first solo album. Released in 1979 it was Otway's first departure from working with Wild Willy Barrett, and his first working with a different backing band. Most of the tracks were salvaged from an aborted attempt to record an album during August and September 1978 at Mountain Studios.

== Critical reception ==
Trouser Press praised the "poignant" "Frightened and Scared."

== Track listing ==
All tracks are written by John Otway except where stated

No.	Title	Writer(s)	Length
1.	"Makes Good Music"		4:13
2.	"It's a Pain"		4:37
3.	"Blue Eyes of the Belle"		4:41
4.	"Best Dream"		4:47
5.	"What a Woman"		3:23
6.	"Frightened and Scared"		2:23
7.	"Waiting (Waiting for You)"	Otway, Thomas Crimble	2:55
8.	"Hurting Her More"	Otway, Thomas Crimble	3:50
9.	"The Highwayman"	Otway, Alfred Noyes	6:00

== Personnel ==
- John Otway – vocals, guitar
- Maggie Ryder – backing vocals
- Paul Martinez – bass
- Charlie Morgan – drums
- Julian Smedley – fiddle
- Ollie Halsall – guitar
- Morgan Fisher – keyboards

=== Technical ===
- Neil Innes – producer
- John Altman – arrangements
- Steve James – engineering, production
- Nick Thomas – assistant engineer
