= All Balls & No Willy =

Studio album by John Otway
- Released: July 1982
- Studios: The Module Mobile; Basing Street Studio
- Genre: New wave
- Label: Empire
- Producers: Tim Summerhayes; John Otway

John Otway chronology
Way & Bar (1980)	All Balls & No Willy (1982)	The Wimp & The Wild (1989)

Singles from All Balls & No Willy
- 1. "In Dreams" / "You Ain't Seen Nothing Yet" Released: October 1982; 2. "Mass Communication" / "Baby It's The Real Thing" Released: April 1983; 3. "Middle Of Winter" / "It Makes Me See Red" Released: November 1983

Professional ratings
Review scores
Source	Rating
AllMusic	3/5 stars

All Balls & No Willy is the second solo album by the English singer-songwriter John Otway. Released in 1982, Otway was backed by new wave band the Europeans.

The title refers to the fact that Otway had once again separated from his partner Wild Willy Barrett.

== Track listing ==
No.	Title	Writer(s)	Length
1.	"In Dreams"	Roy Orbison
2.	"Too Much Air Not Enough Oxygen"	John Otway, Chris Birkett
3.	"Telex"	Otway
4.	"Montreal"	Otway
5.	"Baby It's The Real Thing"	Otway
6.	"Turn Off Your Dream (Don't Watch The Nightmare)" (I Believe)	Otway
7.	"Mass Communication"	Otway
8.	"House Is Burning"	Otway, Birkett
9.	"Halloween"	Otway, Glen Matlock
10.	"Nothings Gone (Except No.1)"	Otway, Birkett
11.	"Middle Of Winter"	Otway, Birkett

== Personnel ==
- John Otway – vocals, saxophone, production
- Tim Summerhayes – engineering, production
- Doug McArthur – Track arranger

=== The Europeans ===
- Ferg Harper – bass
- Geoff Dugmore – drums
- Colin Woore – guitar
- Steve Hogarth – keyboards
