= Fools Meeting =

Studio album by Carol Grimes and Delivery
- Released: 1970
- Recorded: 28 April–2 May 1970
- Studio: Morgan Studios, London
- Genre: Progressive rock
- Length: 45:47; 79:10 (bonus track)
- Label: B&C, Cuneiform (reissue)
- Producer: Delivery

Fools Meeting is an album by Carol Grimes with the British blues/progressive rock band Delivery, founded in the late 1968. The band was one of the wellsprings of the progressive rock Canterbury scene.

Fools Meeting was their only album, originally released on vinyl in 1970. A CD re-release with additional tracks was released by Cuneiform Records.

== Track listing ==
1. "Blind to Your Light" - 5:05 (Carol Grimes, Phil Miller)
2. "Miserable Man" - 8:28 (words — Carol Grimes, music — Delivery)
3. "Home Made Ruin" - 3:23 (Phil Miller)
4. "It Is Really the Same" - 5:44 (Keith Jarrett)
5. "We Were Satisfied" - 4:02 (Phil Miller)
6. "The Wrong Time" - 7:50 (Carol Grimes, Delivery)
7. "Fighting It Out" - 5:48 (Phil Miller)
8. "Fools Meeting" - 5:27 (Carol Grimes, Delivery)

Additional tracks on the CD:

1. "Harry Lucky" (Single A-side) - 3:41 (words — Pip Pyle, Alfreda Benge; music — Steve Miller)
2. "Home Made Ruin" - 2:56 (Single B-side)
3. "Is It Really The Same?" - 5:19 (live in London, late 1970)
4. "Blind to Your Light" - 5:29 (live in London, late 1970)
5. "One for You" - 7:43 (from the Coxhill-Miller album, with Richard Sinclair) (Steve Miller)

== Personnel ==
- Carol Grimes - vocals, lyrics
- Phil Miller - guitar, lyrics
- Steve Miller - piano
- Roy Babbington - bass
- Pip Pyle - drums

with:

- Lol Coxhill - saxophones
- Roddy Skeaping - viola track 2
- Richard Sinclair - bass track 13
