= Open Toed and Flapping =

Studio album by Wild Willy Barrett
- Released: 1995
- Recorded: Orchard Farm Studios, 1992–1994
- Genre: Folk, Blues
- Length: 49:51
- Label: Park Records
- Producer: Wild Willy Barrett

Wild Willy Barrett chronology
The Wimp & The Wild (1989)	Open Toed and Flapping (1995)	Mound of Sound (1997)

Open Toed and Flapping is an album by Wild Willy Barrett; released in 1995, it is a collection of folk songs. Barrett was backed by his then current live band.

== Track listing ==
All tracks are written by Barrett except where noted

Track Listing
No.	Title	Writer(s)	Arranged by	Length
1.	"Jacko Diamonds"	Traditional	Barrett
2.	"Crow that Chicken"	Traditional	Barrett
3.	"Open Toed and Flapping"
4.	"H.T. Blues"	Hank Williams	Barrett
5.	"Hair Across the Frets"
6.	"Father Jim" (Deal 'em Down)
7.	"Chinatown Part 1"
8.	"M.K. Special"	Trad.	Barrett
9.	"Notting Hill"
10.	"Hot Clubbing"
11.	"Cowboy"
12.	"Judge and the Devil"
13.	"Blacksmiths Rope"

== Musical personnel ==
- Wild Willy Barrett:
  - Vocals [1, 2, 4, 6, 8, 9, 11]
  - Guitar [6, 7, 10, 11, 13]
  - Banjo [1, 2]
  - Fiddle [1, 2, 8]
  - Piano [4]
  - Harmonium [7]
  - Balalaika [8]
- Mark Freeman
  - Cardboard Box [1, 2, 6, 8, 9]
  - Pallet [1, 2, 4, 6, 8]
  - Vocals [2, 4, 11]
  - 400 Gallon Diesel Tank [1]
  - Owl [2]
  - Castanets [4]
  - Fish [6]
  - Heavy Gauge Corrugated Iron [10]
- Paul Ward
  - Harmonium [1, 2, 6, 8, 9]
- Linton
  - Blues Harp
