= Mound of Sound =

Studio album by Wild Willy Barrett
- Released: 1997
- Recorded: Log-a-Rhythm studios
- Genre: Folk
- Label: Imaginit
- Producer: Tom Rogers

Wild Willy Barrett chronology
Open Toed and Flapping (1995)	Mound of Sound (1997)	Gypsies Too (2002)

Professional ratings
Review scores
Source	Rating
Allmusic	4/5 stars

Wild Willy Barrett's Mound of Sound is the fifth solo album by Wild Willy Barrett; released in 1997, it is a collection of newly-written folk songs. The album features contributions from fellow Buckinghamshire guitarist "John Cadman" and "Bad Attitude" a collective made up of Carl Taylor and Stephen Two-Names; Mickey Mouse guy, on his third solo album, Organic Bondage.

== Track list ==
All tracks are written by Barrett and Painter except where stated

Track list
No.	Title	Writer(s)	Arranged by	Length
1.	"Harmoundium"
2.	"Guitharmoundium"
3.	"Boris"
4.	"Mélodié Au Tatay"
5.	"Milkfloat Blues"
6.	"African Romance"
7.	"Fortune"	John Dowland	John Cadman
8.	"Jubb"	Bad Attitude
9.	"Fuego De Espaniol"
10.	"The Mound"
11.	"Bergerette Sans Roch With Mound"		John Cadman

== Personnel ==
- Wild Willy Barrett - harmonium (1, 3), guitar (2, 6, 9), balalaika (3), slide guitar (4), eggneck guitar (5), ukulele (6]
- Mark Freeman - cardboard box (3, 5), marching drum (3, 9), waste bin (3), Tunisian drum (6)
- Birgitta Herminegildus van Dongen - vocals (3, 5, 6, 10)
- John Cadman - lute (7, 11), bandora (10)
