= Way & Bar =

Studio album by John Otway & Wild Willy Barrett
- Released: August 1980
- Recorded: Early 1980, Barrett's Place
- Genre: Rock, Folk, Electronic
- Length: 30:35
- Label: Polydor
- Producer: Wild Willy Barrett

John Otway chronology
Where Did I Go Right? (1979)	Way & Bar (1980)	All Balls & No Willy (1982)

Wild Willy Barrett chronology
Call of the Wild (1979)	Way & Bar (1980)	Krazy Kong Album (1980)

Singles from Way & Bar
- 1. "Birthday Boy / What A Woman" Released: 15 April 1980; 2. "D.K. 50 80 / It's A Long Long Time Since I Heard Homestead On The Farm / Homestead On The Farm" Released: June 1980

Professional ratings
Review scores
Source	Rating
Allmusic	1.5/5 stars
Smash Hits	7/10

Way & Bar is the 1980 album by John Otway & Wild Willy Barrett. Their last on Polydor, it also proved to be the 2nd split of the duo lasting until The Wimp and The Wild. The name Way & Bar is derived from the billboard on the back of the DK 50/80 single being cropped for the front cover. In this case, the words 'Otway & Barrett' wrap around the sleeve and the rest of the text appears on the back cover.

== History ==
As with Barrett's solo album Call of the Wild and single "A Shot of Red Eye", the album was recorded at Barrett's Place; a farm at Gawcott, just off Aylesbury.

The intro of DK 50/80 is a sample of two girls from a band called Sausage singing "K.D. 80/50 / You’re so nifty / K.D. 80/50 / You’re so nifty / Tie her up / Tie her down / Turn her over / Turn her ‘round." reversed. Sausage was headed by Ken Liversausage, a collaborator of Barrett's; both of them appeared on the Aylesbury Goes Flaccid compilation. "DK 50/80" was created in the studio in such a way that it cannot be performed live easily. Otway sang into a microphone wired up to a delay unit synced up to the bass-drum synth, thus when he sang "Did you...", the unit would output that line directly after. However, during the 'Tent Tour' Barrett would sing the lyrics backwards.

The Chinese text which appears on the front cover of the DK 50/80 single reads "界色" or roughly translated in English as "Boundary Colour".

=== Way & Hal demos ===
During April 1979 Otway and guitarist Ollie Halsall (guitar, bass, drums and vocals) recorded some of the songs featured on the album. Halsall's original version of "Traveling Show" was released on his posthumous album Caves. Halsall also played guitar on Otway's previous solo album Where Did I Go Right? and was a collaborator with its producer, Neil Innes, in The Rutles.

Songs recorded:

- Cry Cry
- Body Talk
- The Man Who Shot Liberty Valence
- When Love's In Bloom
- Day After Day / 21 Days
- Traveling Show
- Natasha

== The Tent Tour ==
Otway & Barrett's record buying public was considerably smaller than the crowds at their gigs so Polydor came up with a marketing strategy tailored to the tour. To attend any of the dates the punter would have to purchase the DK 50/80 single, thus increasing record sales and spreading awareness of the tour. The lack of paid entrance meant that Otway & Barrett got no money from the Tour and thus had to camp around the country when the idea of a large caravan was scuppered by Otway's manager Maurice Bacon.

=== June ===
- 23 Albery's Wine Bar, CANTERBURY
- 24 Trinity Hall Community Center, BRISTOL
- 25 Chapter Ans Center, CARDIFF
- 26 Crown & Anchor Hotel, Stonehouse, GLOUCESTER
- 27 Gryphon, Shipley, SOUTHAMPTON
- 28 Rolley's Wine Bar, TUNBRIDGE WELLS
- 29 Oranges & Lemons, OXFORD
- 30 Nags Head Hotel, Wollaston, NORTHANTS.

=== July ===
- 1 Great Northern Hotel, CAMBRIDGE
- 2 Cinderella's Night Club, IPSWICH
- 3 White's, NORWICH
- 4 Fosseway Hotel, LEICESTER
- 5 The Millstone, Thomas Street, MANCHESTER 4
- 7 Golden Eagle, BIRMINGHAM

The logo of the tour

- 8 General Wolfe, COVENTRY
- 9 Grey Goose, Gedling, NOTTS.
- 10 Rose & Crown, HANLEY
- 11 Penguin, SHEFFIELD
- 12 Royal Park Hotel, LEEDS
- 13 Norbreck Castle Hotel, BLACKPOOL
- 15 Lincoln's Inn, Rainford Square, LIVERPOOL
- 16 Cooperage, Quayside, NEWCASTLE—UPON-TYNE
- 17 Barge Inn, Skellgate, YORK

John Otway (center), Willy Barrett (left) and Mark Freeman (right) midgig on the penultimate night of the tour

- 18 Tabeo Rock Club, SCARBOROUGH
- 19 Castle Inn, DURHAM
- 21 Oughton's, DUMFRIES
- 22 Bungalow Bar, PAISLEY
- 23 Eric Brown's, EDINBURGH
- 24 Wellington Club, HULL

The musicians on the tour are as follows:

- John Otway: Vox, Guitar
- Wild Willy Barrett: Vox, Guitar, Violin
- Mark Freeman: Drums
- Alan Offer: Bass

== Track listing ==
All tracks are written by John Otway except where indicated.

Side 1
No.	Title	Writer(s)	Length
1.	"Birthday Boy"	Otway, Barrett
2.	"DK 50/80"	Otway, Barrett
3.	"Cry, Cry"	Otway, Ollie Halsall
4.	"21 Days"	Otway, Halsall
5.	"Medieval Dance"

Side 2
No.	Title	Writer(s)	Length
1.	"Body Talk"	Otway, Halsall
2.	"Baby's In the Club"
3.	"The Man Who Shot Liberty Valence"	Burt Bacharach, Hal David
4.	"When Love's In Bloom"	Otway, Halsall
5.	"Day After Day"	Otway, Halsall
6.	"Come Back Darling"

== Personnel ==
- John Otway - vocals, guitar
- Wild Willy Barrett - guitar, violin
- Mark Freeman - drums
- Nigel Pegrum - drums
- Maurice Bacon - drums
- Roger Carey - bass
- Lol Coxhill - saxophone
- Paul Ward - bass
