= Montserrat (album) =

Studio album by John Otway
- Released: May 2017
- Recorded: Olveston House, Montserrat
- Genre: Rock
- Label: Red Bowler Records
- Producer: Chris Birkett

John Otway chronology
Bunsen Burner - The Album (2006)	Montserrat (2017)

Professional ratings
Review scores
Source	Rating
Classic Rock	2/5 stars
Get Ready to Rock	4/5 stars

Montserrat is the seventh solo album by English singer-songwriter John Otway. Released in 2017, Otway was backed by The Big Band, who he had toured with several times prior.

== Development ==
The idea for the album came when a fan invited Otway to Montserrat. Otway later said that it was around the same time that he had learned about the founding of AIR Studios Montserrat in the late 1970s. This led to a Kickstarter being set up, where Otway informed fans that £10,000 would enable the album "to be recorded in my guitarist's garage in Essex!" If the fund reached £30,000 they could both record in Montserrat and enlist Grammy Award-winner Chris Birkett to produce. Nearly £40,000 had been raised by the time the campaign ended. It was later revealed that recording would take place in Olveston House.

== Track listing ==
No.	Title	Length
1.	"Dancing with Ghosts"	4:11
2.	"Seagulls on Speed"	3:45
3.	"Real Tears from Both Eyes"	3:33
4.	"I Shouldn't Be Doing This"	2:44
5.	"Five Kisses"	2:53
6.	"Already Missing You"	3:04
7.	"Jenny"	5:02
8.	"Toronto"	3:16
9.	"Somewhere Else to Go"	3:50
10.	"There's a War Going On"	4:31
11.	"The Conductor's Waltz"	3:37

== Personnel ==
- John Otway – vocals, theremin
- Richard Holgarh – electric guitar, keyboards, backing vocals
- Murray Torkildsen – electric guitar, acoustic guitar, backing vocals
- Adam Batterbee – drums
- Seymour – bass
- Chris Birkett – electric guitar, keyboards
- Peter Filleul – keyboards
- Natalie Wong – violin, viola
- The Montserrat Youth Choir – backing vocals
- Chris Birkett – producer
- Malcom Atkin – engineer
