= Please Don't Throw Me to the Christians =

Unfinished and unreleased album by English singer-songwriter Eddie Stanton

Studio album (unreleased) by Eddie Stanton
- Recorded: 1979–1981 "Barrett's Place", Gawcott and "Pace Studios", Milton Keynes
- Genre: Indie, punk rock
- Producer: Wild Willy Barrett

Singles from Please Don't Throw Me to the Christians
- 1. "Lucifer Wants Me for a Sunbeam" / "Suicide Note" Released: 1980; 2. "Milton Keynes We Love You" / "Colour in Brail" Released: May 1981

Please Don't Throw Me to the Christians is an unfinished and unreleased album by English singer-songwriter Eddie Stanton. It was to be released on Wild Willy Barrett's record label "Black Eye" which had, by the time the album had been fully recorded, folded. The fate of five of these songs rested in Barrett's album Organic Bondage, which he arranged to fit his style. Other tracks have been since recorded by Barrett later on in his career.

Despite not being released, two singles – containing firstly two tracks culled from the album and secondly re-recordings of two of the songs – were released on Barrett's record label.

Circa 2007, Stanton made the twenty tracks recorded for the album available on his website;

These tracks are really the result of two albums, or maybe one album recorded twice. The initial session was done in 79 shortly after I met Willy and a single off it was released on his Black Eye Label. The second single was a re-recorded version of Milton Keynes... ...The album's release got so delayed that it sounded nothing like I did at the time, so we went into PACE studio in MK re-recorded some tracks and recorded new ones. This never got released either as I changed labels to Polydor just as the recording was completed, or did it? According to the distributors catalogue and various record collectors lists there is a "please don't throw me to the christians" album. If it does exist I've never seen one, and I've no idea which set of tracks make it up…

— Eddie Stanton

== Track listing ==
The cover for the single "Milton Keynes We Love You". This was the re-recorded version and featured a full band. Featured on the cover are the infamous Concrete Cows of Milton Keynes.

- "Please Don't Throw Me to the Christians"
- "The Emperors Head"
- "Decline and Fall"
- "From Here to Obscurity"
- "Lucifer Wants Me for a Sunbeam"
- "Only the Good Die Young"
- "Milton Keynes (We Love You)"
- "Union Jacks in the Rain"
- "Tamac"
- "Suicide Note"
- "Africa (Oh for a Car)"
- "A Clockwork Orange"
- "East of Babel"
- "All the Angry Young Men"
- "Simply Idolatry"
- "Party Time"
- "The Hitchhiker and the Punk"
- "Tales from the Raj"
- "Gypsies Too"
- "Colour in Braille"

== Personnel ==
- Eddie Stanton - vocals, guitar
- Wild Willy Barrett - guitar
- Hugh Jones - synthesizers
- Mark Freeman - drums
- Alan Offer - bass guitar
- Dave James
- Vietnamese Rose - backing vocals
- Paul "Whisky" Ward - synthesizers, keyboards

== See also ==
- Damnatio ad bestias - the Roman capital punishment
