= John Otway & Wild Willy Barrett =

Studio album by John Otway & Wild Willy Barrett
- Released: 1976
- Recorded: 1971–76
- Studio: Eel Pie Studios, Twickenham; Chalk Farm Studios, London
- Genre: Folk rock, pub rock, garage rock
- Length: 34:23
- Label: Extracked, Polydor
- Producer: Pete Townshend, Barron Anthony, Wild Willy Barrett

John Otway & Wild Willy Barrett chronology
John Otway & Wild Willy Barrett (1976)	Deep & Meaningless (1978)

John Otway & Wild Willy Barrett is the 1976 debut album by English folk singer-songwriter duo John Otway and Wild Willy Barrett. Released first on their own Extracked Records, the album is a collection of recordings made between 1971 and 1976.

Recording began with a series of sessions at Pete Townshend's Eel Pie Studios in which The Who guitarist contributed as an arranger, producer and performer. Townshend produced the first two Track label singles by the duo, "Murder Man" and "Louisa On a Horse", which were included on the album.

A third single, "Really Free", reached No.27 in the UK charts in December 1977 after the pair performed a set live on the BBC TV show The Old Grey Whistle Test. The performance was notable for an incident in which Otway vaulted on to a PA tower and overbalanced after Barrett's signal began cutting out. The Independent reported: "He brought down the speaker stack but fractured no bones when he landed on the sharp corner of a bass cabinet, as the impact was cushioned by his testicles."

Polydor reissued the album after signing the band in 1977. The AllMusic website rated it seven out of 10, describing it as a patchwork collection that "dances on a peculiar precipice somewhere between folk and country, pop and pub rock".

== Track listing ==
All tracks written by Otway and Barrett except where noted

=== Side one ===
1. "Misty Mountain" - 2:29
2. "Murder Man" - 2:18
3. "If I Did" - 2:19
4. "Racing Cars (Jet Spotter of the Track)" - 2:50
5. "Louisa on a Horse" (Otway) - 2:44
6. "Gypsy" (Otway) - 3:53

=== Side two ===
1. "Really Free" - 2:59
2. "Bluey Green" (Otway) - 2:16
3. "Cheryl's Going Home" (Bob Lind) - 4:45
4. "Trying Times" (Otway) - 3:49
5. "Geneve" (Otway) - 4:01

All produced by Barrett except tracks 1,2,3,5 (Pete Townshend) and 4 (Barron Anthony)

== Personnel ==
- John Otway
- Wild Willy Barrett
- Pete Townshend
- Paul Ward
- Nigel Pegrum
- Phil Cutler
- Stuart Eaton
- Lyn Fletcher
- Fiona Brett
- Martin Loveday
- Milton Reame-James
- Liza Strike
