= Organic Bondage =

Studio album by Wild Willy Barrett & Two-Names
- Released: May 1986
- Recorded: 1986 @ Avocado Studios, Aylesbury; JO'D: 1985 @ Trakeasy Studios
- Genres: Folk, Reggae, Electronic
- Length: 44:16
- Label: Galvanized Records
- Producer: Tom Rogers

Wild Willy Barrett chronology
Krazy Kong Album (1980)	Organic Bondage (w/Stephen Two-Names) (1986)	The Wimp & The Wild (w/John Otway) (1989)

Singles from Organic Bondage
- 1. "Hitchhiker and the Punk / Jack O'Diamonds (O'Lloydy)" Released: 26 April 1985

Organic Bondage is the third album by Wild Willy Barrett and the only one with Stephen Two-Names. It was released in 1986.

== History ==
In 1986, having not released an album for 5 years, Barrett teamed up with bassist Stephen Two-Names. Due to Barrett's ethic of making over buying, most of the instruments featured on the album were made by some men in Bristol, credited as "Gnomes". The scratching sound on "Jack O' Diamonds" is a tape of Two-Names singing in the bath dragged across a tape-head.

Once the album had been recorded, Barrett bought loads of sheets of plywood and made 100 wooden sleeves; the yellow coloured insert and record would slide in to the sleeve through the side. Subsequent pressings were released in a standard grey coloured record sleeve although the content of the vinyl, and the label, were the same.

The album's launch was at a pub in Aylesbury.

Most of the material on the album was written by frequent collaborator Eddie Stanton. Stanton had written "The Young and the Free" which had been recorded by Vietnamese Rose and John Otway and would later provide the seminal "Focke Wolfe" for "The Wimp and The Wild". In fact half of the songs on the album were taken from Stanton's abandoned "Please Don't Throw Me To The Christians" album.

== Track listing ==
All tracks are written by Barrett and Stanton except where stated.

Side 1
No.	Title	Writer(s)	Length
1.	"Please Don't Throw Me to the Christians"		5:22
2.	"Only the Good Die Young"		5:08
3.	"Emperor's Head"		3:13
4.	"Jack o' Diamonds (O'Lloydy)"	Barrett	3:49
5.	"Dream in Colour"		4:23

Side 2
No.	Title	Writer(s)	Length
1.	"Milton Keynes"		3:42
2.	"Tales from the Raj"	Stanton	3:46
3.	"Deal 'Em Down"		5:00
4.	"Moose Loose Kicking"		5:01
5.	"The Late Show"		4:59
Total length:			44:16

== Personnel ==
- Wild Willy Barrett - vocals, guitar, wood, fiddle
- Stephen Two-Names - bass, backing vocals
- Paul "Whisky" Ward - engineering, keyboards on "Dream in Colour", "Only the Good Die Young" and "The Late Show"
- Michelle Morrison - vocals on "Dream in Colour" and "The Late Show"
- Linda Harvey - cover, label, insert
- Johnathan Purcell - illustration
- Gnomes - condolences for constructing the Organic Bondage instruments
