= Deep & Meaningless =

Studio album by John Otway & Wild Willy Barrett
- Released: 10 June 1978
- Studio: Bray Sound, Windsor, Berkshire
- Genre: Indie folk
- Length: 35:25
- Label: Polydor
- Producer: Wild Willy Barrett

John Otway chronology
John Otway & Wild Willy Barrett (1977)	Deep & Meaningless (1978)	Where Did I Go Right? (1979)

Wild Willy Barrett chronology
John Otway & Wild Willy Barrett (1977)	Deep & Meaningless (1978)	Call of the Wild (1979)

Professional ratings
Review scores
Source	Rating
AllMusic	4.5/5 stars

Deep & Meaningless is the second album by English folk singer-songwriter duo John Otway and Wild Willy Barrett. It was released in 1978. The album included the song "Beware Of The Flowers ('Cos I'm Sure They're Going To Get You Yeah)", which was voted Britain's seventh most popular song lyric in a 1999 BBC online poll. The song's strong showing—ahead of The Moody Blues' "Nights in White Satin" and Hoagy Carmichael's "Stardust"—was the result of what Otway's website described as a "well orchestrated campaign" by fans.

AllMusic rates the album as a "triumph" and gives it 4 1/2 out of 5 stars.

== Track listing ==
All songs written by John Otway except where noted

Side one

1. "Place Farm Way" - 3:31
2. "To Anne" - 3:27
3. "Beware of the Flowers ('Cos I'm Sure They're Going to Get You Yeah)" - 2:30
4. "The Alamo" (Jane Bowers) - 3:16
5. "Oh My Body Is Making Me" - 4:09

Side two

1. "Josephine" (Otway, Warren Harry) - 7:02
2. "Schnot" - 2:44
3. (a) "Riders in the Sky" (Stan Jones)

(b) "Running from the Law"
(c) "Riders in the Sky" - 3:03

4. "I Wouldn't Wish It on You" - 3:11
5. "Can't Complain" - 2:32

== Personnel ==
- John Otway - lead vocals, guitar,
- Wild Willy Barrett - guitar, violin
- Nigel Pegrum - drums
- Maggie Ryder - backing vocals
- Mark Freeman - drums
- Dave Holmes - drums
- Yvonne Grech - backing vocals
- Simon Hanson

Technical

- Adam Francis - engineer
- Jill Mumford - sleeve design
- Paddy Eckersley - photography
