= Carol Grimes =

British singer and songwriter (born 1944)

Carol Ann Grimes (born 7 April 1944) is a British jazz singer and songwriter.

In 1969, she joined the band Delivery and recorded one album before departing for a solo career. Her debut solo album, Warm Blood (1974), was recorded with members of Area Code 615 and the Average White Band. She recorded her second album in Memphis, Tennessee, with the Brecker Brothers, Donald "Duck" Dunn, and The Memphis Horns. She founded the band Eyes Wide Open in 1984.

Her career expanded into teaching and working in musical theatre. In the 1990s, she worked with the choir The Shout.

== Discography ==
- 1970 Fools Meeting – credited as Carol Grimes with Delivery (lead vocalist)
- 1972 Old Hat – with Uncle Dog (lead vocalist)
- 1974 Warm Blood (Caroline)
- 1977 Carol Grimes (La Cooka Ratcha) (originally on the Decca label)
- 1986 Eyes Wide Open (Line)
- 1989 Why They Don't Dance (Line)
- 1996 Alive at Ronnie Scott's with Janette Mason (Ronnie Scott's Jazz House)
- 2000 Sweet Fa (La Cooka Ratcha)
- 2003 Daydreams & Danger
- 2003 Mother
- 2007 Something Secret recorded with Giles Perring (Triumphant Sound)
- 2013 CDAWN (La Cooka Ratcha)
