= The Wimp & The Wild =

Studio album by John Otway and Wild Willy Barrett
- Released: August 1989
- Recorded: Pace Studios, Milton Keynes + Avocado Studios, Aylesbury
- Genre: Punk, Folk, Electronic
- Length: 33:25
- Label: VM Records
- Producer: Wild Willy Barrett

John Otway chronology
All Balls & No Willy (1982)	The Wimp & The Wild (1989)	Under the Covers and Over the Top (1992)

Wild Willy Barrett chronology
Organic Bondage (1986)	The Wimp & The Wild (1989)	Open Toed and Flapping (1994)

Singles from The Wimp & The Wild
- 1. "Last of the Mohicans / Fashion" Released: 1987

Professional ratings
Review scores
Source	Rating
AllMusic	4/5 stars
The Encyclopedia of Popular Music	2/5 stars

The Wimp & The Wild is the fourth and final album by John Otway & Wild Willy Barrett, released in 1989.

== History ==
The writing process for The Wimp & The Wild goes back 10 years. "Best Dream" is a re-recording of the Where Did I Go Right track.

== Critical reception ==
AllMusic wrote that "within its corridors lurk some of Otway's finest performances of the age, beginning with an almost heartbreakingly Spartan revision of 'Best Dream.'" Martin C. Strong wrote that the album "ranged from 'wimp-ish' acoustics from John to stripped-down covers."

== Track listing ==
All tracks are written by John Otway except where indicated.

Side 1
No.	Title	Writer(s)	Length
1.	"The Wimp"
2.	"Best Dream"
3.	"Fashion"	Otway, Robyn Boult
4.	"Volunteer"	Otway, Warren Harry
5.	"Blockbuster"	Nicky Chinn, Mike Chapman
6.	"Separated"	Bannister

Side 2
No.	Title	Writer(s)	Length
1.	"The Wild"	Otway, Boult
2.	"House of the Rising Sun"	Traditional; arranged by Otway and Barrett
3.	"Last of the Mohicans"	Otway, Boult
4.	"I Believe"
5.	"I Am A Lion"
6.	"Focke Wolfe"	Eddie Stanton

== Personnel ==
- John Otway - vocals, guitar
- Wild Willy Barrett - guitar, bass, drums, drum pads, programming
- Liam Grundy - piano on "Separated"
