= Call of the Wild (Wild Willy Barrett album) =

Studio album by Wild Willy Barrett
- Released: June 1979
- Recorded: Barrett's Place; 1979
- Genre: Folk, Rock, Punk
- Length: 37:15
- Label: Polydor
- Producer: Wild Willy Barrett

Wild Willy Barrett chronology
| Deep & Meaningless (1978) | Call of the Wild (1979) | Way & Bar (1980) |

Singles from Call of the Wild
- 1. "Let's Play Schools / I Did It Otway" Released: March 1979

Professional ratings
Review scores
| Source | Rating |
|---|---|
| Allmusic | 4.5/5 stars |

Call of the Wild is Wild Willy Barrett's first solo album. It was released in 1979 on the Polydor record label.

== Track list ==
Side 1
| No. | Title | Writer(s) | Length |
|---|---|---|---|
| 1. | "Late Night Lady" | Mike Gatton, Ken Murray, Roy Hurley | 3:31 |
| 2. | "Temptation" | Gatton, Murray | 3:20 |
| 3. | "Heartbeat of the City" | Gatton, Murray | 3:45 |
| 4. | "Let's Play Schools" | Barrett | 3:05 |
| 5. | "Close Encounters" | Barrett | 2:48 |
| 6. | "The Song" | Gatton, Murray | 3:26 |

Side 2
| No. | Title | Writer(s) | Length |
|---|---|---|---|
| 1. | "Nigel Pringle" | Barrett | 3:15 |
| 2. | "Eye of A Hurricane" | Gatton, Murray | 2:58 |
| 3. | "Take Me Back" | Traditional; arranged by Barrett | 4:03 |
| 4. | "Ole Slewfoot" | Traditional; arranged by Barrett | 2:20 |
| 5. | "I Did It Otway" | Barrett | 4:49 |
| Total length: | | | 37:15 |

== Personnel ==
- Wild Willy Barrett - vocals, guitar, violin, bass
- Martin Freeman - drums
- Yvonne Grech - vocals
- Paul Ward - bass and acoustic guitar on "Take Me Back" and "Ole Slewfoot"
- David Holmes - drums on "Let's Play Schools" and "Nigel Pringle"
- Debbie Grech - backing vocals
