= John Otway =

English singer-songwriter (born 1952)

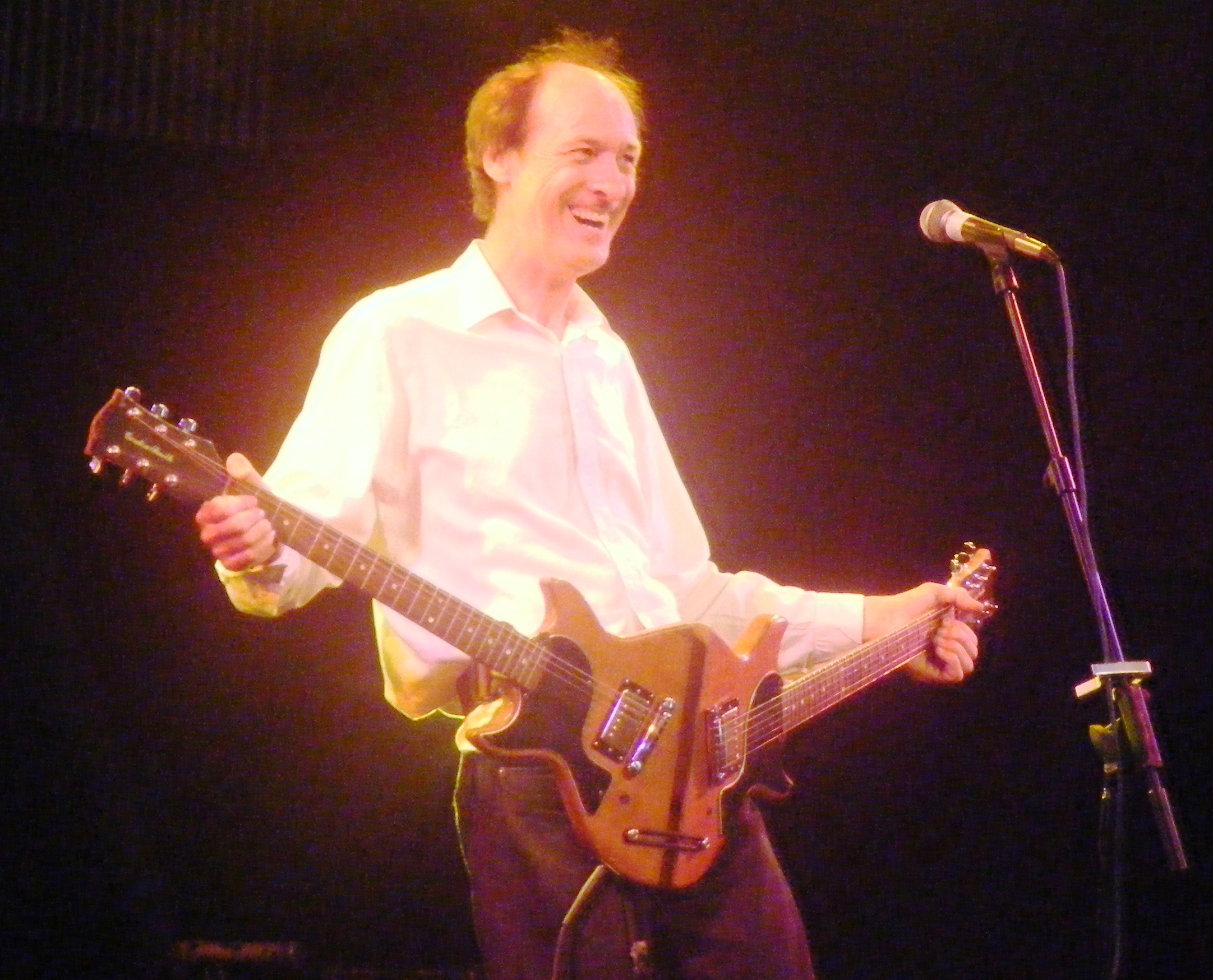
- Otway performing in the Cabaret Tent at the 2010 Glastonbury Festival

Background information
- Born: 2 October 1952 (age 74); Aylesbury, Buckinghamshire, England
- Genres: Pop; rock; folk; punk music
- Instruments: Guitar; theremin; violin; vocals
- Years active: 1969–present
- Labels: Polydor; U-Vibe; Microstar; Red Bowler
- Website: johnotway.com

John Otway (born 2 October 1952) is an English guitarist and singer-songwriter with two hit records - 1977's "Really Free" with Wild Willy Barrett and the 2002 disco pastiche "Bunsen Burner". He has performed over 5,000 gigs and in 2022 received an honorary doctorate from Oxford Brookes University. He has built a sizeable cult audience through extensive touring, a surreal sense of humour and self-deprecating underdog persona.

== Biography ==
=== Early life ===
Otway was born in Aylesbury, Buckinghamshire. From the age of nine, he wanted to be a pop star. But even at that age, having listened to his sister's Beatles and Rolling Stones records, he knew he would never be able to do that. However, when his sister got the latest Bob Dylan album, he knew there was a place for him and he set about learning how to play guitar.

=== 1970s and 1980s ===
After teaming up with Wild Willy Barrett, the duo recorded their debut double A side single "Gypsy" and "Misty Mountain" in 1972 at County Recording Service - a custom recording company based in Bracknell, Berkshire. The single failed to trouble the UK chart, but despite this, it found its way to the Who's guitarist Pete Townshend who, impressed with the songs, asked Otway and Barrett along to his house and offered to produce some tracks for the duo's first album.

Otway had to wait until 1977 and the rise of punk before achieving Chart success and fame. Having caught the eye of the producers of the BBC's The Old Grey Whistle Test, Otway's performance on that show would grab the attention of the watching audience. Otway, decided to jump on the amplifier of his colleague during a performance of Bob Lind's "Cheryl's Going Home". Otway misjudged his leap and sent Wild Willy Barrett's amplifier tumbling as he crashed down straddling the box under the amp. The full force of the impact was absorbed by the most tender of his body parts, live on mainstream television.

=== "Really Free" ===
Sales of Otway's sixth single, the half-spoken love song "Really Free" released by Polydor Records increased dramatically and reached No. 27 on the UK singles chart. An appearance on the BBC's flagship music programme Top of the Pops (TOTP), where Otway and Barrett were introduced by Elton John. It would however, be his only success for quite some time.

His follow-up single "Geneve" was released without Wild Willy causing a rift between the two. The two artists went their separate ways both recording solo albums for Polydor in 1979. Otway's Where Did I Go Right? was produced by Monty Python collaborator and the Rutles main songwriter Neil Innes and whilst Polydor tried hard to market the album, it failed to live up to expectation and divided opinion. After this and several more failures in the singles market, Otway and Barrett re-united in 1980 to record the Way and Bar album. To support the album's release, Polydor released the single "DK 50/80" which became a minor hit reaching No. 45 in the UK singles chart. The album however failed to reach the UK Albums Chart and would prove to be their final release on Polydor leading to another split which would last almost ten years.

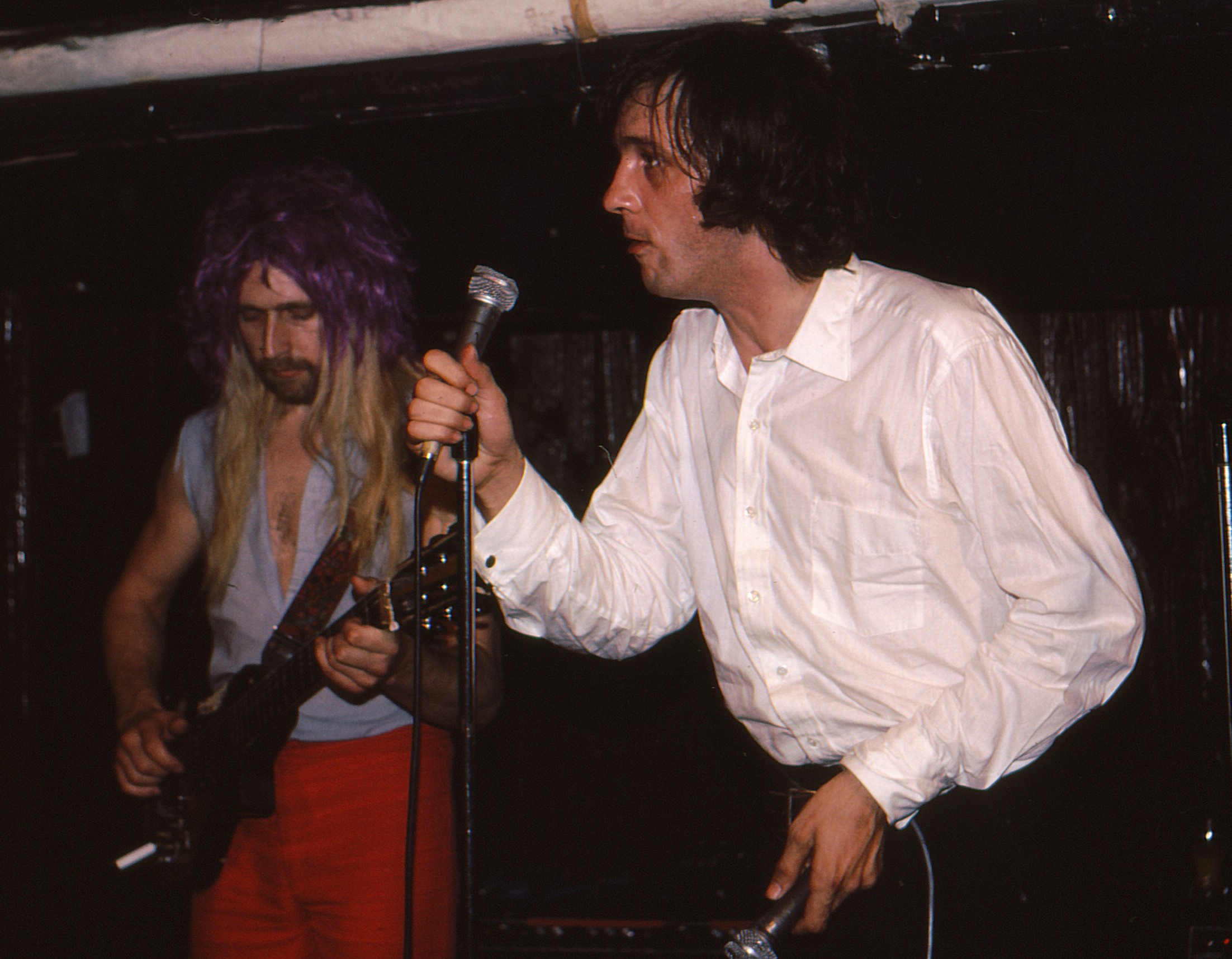
Otway (right) with Wild Willy Barrett in Toronto, 1981

Otway went solo, and in the mid-1980s, he often appeared on Vivian and Ki Longfellow-Stanshall's showboat, the Old Profanity Showboat, in Bristol's Floating Harbour. He also appeared as the musical guest in the final episode of the British sitcom The Young Ones.

At this point, Otway also embarked on a career in acting - appearing in TV shows such as Super Gran, Forever Green, William Tell and Heartbeat. He also appeared in several television commercials including ones for Irn-Bru and R. White's Lemonade. At the same time, he co-wrote with Paul Bradley the stage play Verbal Diary which, with support from Rik Mayall, they performed at the Edinburgh Festival Fringe.

=== 1990s and 2000s ===
In 1990, Otway wrote the autobiography Cor Baby, That's Really Me: Rock and Roll's Greatest Failure and his touring continued to sustain him. He also teamed up with Attila the Stockbroker performing as Headbutts and Halibuts at the 1990 Edinburgh Fringe. They followed this a year later, with a rock opera based around Otway's version of Bob Lind's "Cheryl's Going Home" simply entitled "Cheryl".

Through Atilla, Otway met Richard Holgarth a guitarist from Harlow, Essex. Otway instructed Holgarth to put a band together for him for his 2,000th gig at the London Astoria in 1993. Holgarth recruited musicians Murray Torkildsen guitar, Seymour Fluids (bass), and drummer Adam Batterbee from his hometown and following an extensive tour, over 2,500 fans crammed into the London Astoria. Otway then followed this with a headline, sellout gig at the Royal Albert Hall in 1998.

In 1999, with the help of his fans, a grassroots campaign saw his song "Beware of the Flowers Cause I'm Sure They're Going To Get You, Yeah" - the B-side to his first hit - voted the seventh greatest lyric of all-time in a BBC poll.

Buoyed by this success, and with his 50th birthday coming in 2002, when asked what he wanted for the occasion, Otway requested "a second hit". A concerted drive and fan-led campaign, including a poll (scrutinised by the Electoral Reform Society) to select the track, saw "Bunsen Burner" - with music sampled from The Trammps song "Disco Inferno" and lyrics devised to help his daughter with her chemistry homework - reach number nine in the UK Singles Chart on 6 October, earning Otway an appearance back on Top of the Pops. To encourage his fans to buy more than one copy of the single, he released three different versions. The B-side of "Bunsen Burner - The Hit Mix" was a cover of "The House of the Rising Sun", recorded at Abbey Road Studios and featuring over 900 of his fans on backing vocals, each of whom were credited by name on the single's sleeve. A video for this version was recorded with another sellout crowd at the London Astoria. Otway's chart success caused major problems for the High Street retail chain Woolworths who, despite the single's success steadfastly refused to stock or acknowledge Otway's chart position.

The success was short-lived, and a planned world tour in October 2006, with Otway proposing to hire his own jet to take his band and 300 of his fans to iconic venues such as Carnegie Hall and Sydney Opera House collapsed due to spiralling costs.

=== 2010s and 2020s ===
By 2010, Otway had re-united with Wild Willy Barrett for a UK tour, with the duo regularly performing together since. They recorded a new album 40-Odd Years of Otway and Barrett in 2011. It consisted of re-workings of old songs and a new, previously unrecorded track, "The Snowflake Effect". Otway also continues to tour with his band and perform solo with his roadie Deadly.

During this time, Otway also hosted occasional lectures on the theme Making Success Out of Failure and published the sequel to his autobiography entitled I Did It Otway: Regrets I've Had a Few in May 2010.

In October 2012, to celebrate his 60th birthday, Otway booked the Odeon Leicester Square to show a documentary of his life titled Rock and Roll's Greatest Failure: Otway the Movie. The film was funded by fans becoming producers who were all individually created in the movie credits. The film is also notable for the final scenes being filmed and cut into the screening as it was being shown on the day. In 2013, Otway took the completed movie to the Cannes Film Festival. Otway and 100 of his fans (who donned Otway masks and dressed up in his traditional black jeans and white shirt) travelled down the Promenade de la Croisette to the red carpet. The film also had its theatrical release at Glastonbury Festival in June 2013, before going on a national cinema tour in the summer. It was subsequently voted one of the best movies of the year by readers of The Guardian - coming second to Gravity.

In 2016, Otway set up an online Kickstarter campaign for A New Album of Otway Songs. The campaign was successful, raising £38,916 from a total of 838 individual backers. The resulting album and DVD, Montserrat was recorded at Olverston House, Montserrat in September 2016 and released in March 2017, to those who had supported the Kickstarter campaign, followed by a general release with a launch gig at The Bear, Oxford on 1 May 2017 as part of the city's May Morning celebrations.

During the lockdown in the UK in 2020, Otway recorded a series of Facebook live shows.

The constant gigging over the years meant that on 2 April 2022, Otway celebrated his 5,000th career gig. Held at the O2 Shepherd's Bush Empire as a milestone event, he played the first set with long-time musical partner Wild Willy Barrett and a second set with his band. Later that year, in recognition of his international and musical contribution over five decades, Otway received an Honorary PhD in Music presented by Oxford Brookes University.

In March 2023, Otway performed at the Adelaide Fringe in Australia after an abortive tour of New Zealand (due to Cyclone Gabrielle hitting the day he arrived). He returned to both countries later that same year to fulfill the gigs he had missed and to perform in Sydney.

In 2026, Otway, in order to celebrate over 33 years of his band, launched another Kickstarter campaign to help raise money to take his band around the world 20 years after his aborted world tour and to record a new album. He subsequently touured with his band around the world taking in stops in Canada, New Zealand, Australia and Japan.

== Discography ==
=== Albums ===
Date	Title	With
1977	John Otway & Wild Willy Barrett	Wild Willy Barrett
1978	Deep & Meaningless	Wild Willy Barrett
1979	Where Did I Go Right?	
1980	Way & Bar	Wild Willy Barrett
1982	All Balls & No Willy	
1989	The Wimp & The Wild	Wild Willy Barrett
1991	Cheryl, a Rock Opera	Attila the Stockbroker
1992	Under the Covers and Over the Top	
1993	Live	The Big Band
1995	Premature Adulation	
2000	The Set Remains The Same	The Big Band
2004	OT-AIR	
2006	Bunsen Burner – The Album	
2011	40 Odd Years	Wild Willy Barrett
2014	The Rest of Otway & Barrett	Wild Willy Barrett
2017	Montserrat	The Big Band
2019	John Otway & Wild Willy Barrett (Live to Disc)	Wild Willy Barrett
2024	The Set Remains The Same (Live)	The Big Band
2026	Cheryl: A Rock Opera 35th Anniversary (Remastered)	Attila the Stockbroker
2026	A New World Record	The Big Band

=== Singles/EPs ===
Date	Title	With	UK chart position
1972	"Gypsy" / "Misty Mountain"	Wild Willy Barrett	
1973	"Murder Man"	Wild Willy Barrett	
1976	"Louisa on a Horse"		
1977	"Racing Cars (Jet Spotter of the Track)"	Wild Willy Barrett	
1977	"Really Free"	Wild Willy Barrett	27
1978	"Geneve"		
1978	"Baby's in the Club"		
1979	"Frightened and Scared"		
1980	"Birthday Boy"	Wild Willy Barrett	
1980	"DK 50/80"	Wild Willy Barrett	45
1980	"Green Green Grass of Home"		
1981	"Turning Point"		
1981	"Headbutts"	Wild Willy Barrett	
1982	"In Dreams"		
1983	"Mass Communication"		
1983	"Middle of Winter"		
1986	"The New Jerusalem"		
1987	"Last of the Mohicans"	Wild Willy Barrett	
1988	"Whoops Apocalypse"		
1991	"Cheryl"	Attila the Stockbroker	
1992	"Two Little Boys"	Attila the Stockbroker	
1995	"Delilah"	The Big Band	186
1999	"John Otway and the Aylesbury Youth Orchestra"	Aylesbury Youth Orchestra & The Big Band	
2002	"Bunsen Burner"	The Big Band	9
2008	"No Offence"		
2014	"A John Otway Christma5"	The Big Band	
2017	"Seagulls on Speed"	The Big Band	

== Bibliography ==
- Otway, John (1990). Cor Baby, That's Really Me!. Omnibus Press. ISBN 0-7119-2148-2.
- Otway, John (2010). Cor Baby, That's Really Me! (4th ed.). Karen Lawrence Glass. ISBN 978-0-95643-430-2.
- Otway, John (2010). I Did it Otway: Rock and Roll's Greatest Failure. Karen Lawrence Glass. ISBN 978-0-95643-431-9.
- Otway, John (2019). Deep & Meaningless: The Complete Lyrics of John Otway. Karen Lawrence Glass. ISBN 978-0-95643-433-3.

== See also ==
- List of performers on Top of the Pops
