= Wild Willy Barrett =

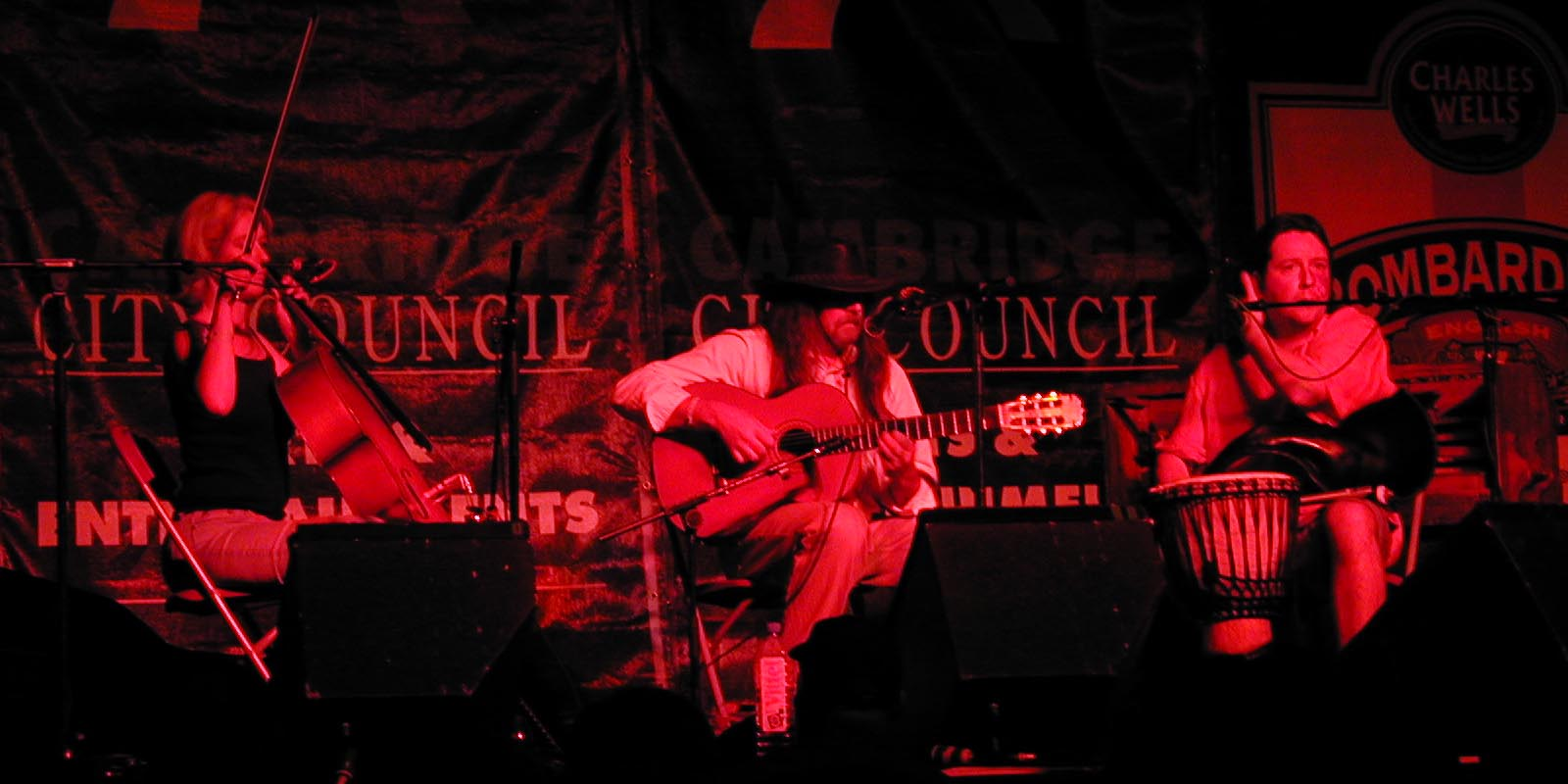
- At the 2003 Cambridge folk festival

Background information
- Born: Roger John Barrett; 30 May 1950 (age 76); Aylesbury, Buckinghamshire, England
- Genres: Folk; reggae; rock; punk
- Occupations: Musician; woodworker
- Instruments: Guitar; vocals; banjo; fiddle; bass; keyboards
- Years active: 1968–present
- Labels: Transatlantic; Logo; Polydor; Red Eye; Black Eye
- Website: wildwillybarrett.com musiczoo.co.uk

Roger John Barrett (born 30 May 1950), known professionally as Wild Willy Barrett, is an English experimental musician and multi-instrumentalist, best known for his collaborations with John Otway. His musical style has included folk, blues, psychedelia, pop and punk rock and his live performances are punctuated with his dry humour and onstage wit. He is known for virtuoso fiddle playing, ability with a great number of stringed instruments, and playing slide guitar with a whole raw egg (known as egg-necking). During recent Otway/Barrett performances, he has also introduced the 'wah wah wheelie bin'.

Barrett is also a skilled wood worker and carver and has produced many furniture over many years.

== Career ==
Barrett comes from Aylesbury. He started playing the ukulele at the age of 4 and soon moved on to other instruments. By the age of 15 he was gigging regularly. He worked with and recorded alongside and in collaboration with his emerging contemporaries. His first commercially available recordings can be found on Guitar Workshop, issued in 1973 by Transatlantic Records. He is also featured on The Contemporary Folk Guitar album with Bert Jansch, John Renbourn, Gordon Giltrap & Ralph McTell. He has worked with many well known artists and has toured with Squeeze, Madness and Steeleye Span and played fiddle, guitar and mandolin for George Hamilton IV. He also played pedal steel guitar on the influential Keith Hudson reggae album entitled Rasta Communication, along with Sly and Robbie.

During the early 1980s, he ran his own record labels; "Black Eye" and "Red Eye", which released music by artists Barrett knew and played with. Amongst them was Eddie Stanton whose songs have been covered extensively by Barrett both live and on record. Before it folded, Black Eye had a number of albums to be released most notably Please Don't Throw Me to the Christians by Stanton – most of the songs from Organic Bondage were derived from those on the album – and "Man of Many Fingers" which would have been Barrett's 3rd solo album.

In the mid-1980s, Barrett started experimenting and recording with a more electronic sound which had been explored in "DK 50/80" and "Birthday Boy" from "Way & Bar". Following his mostly single-based approach at that point he recorded two singles, "Old Joe Clarke" and "Rapping on a Mountain", in 1983, which were both released on Carrere Records. A single called "The Hitchhiker and the Punk" contained a much more textured and layered sound which was created from using in-studio effects and multi-tracking. This culminated, in Barrett's words "By far the most 'off the wall' musical project I have embarked on", in Organic Bondage. He made a wooden record sleeve for the album since he did not have the finances to get a sleeve printed.

In the 1990s, Barrett recorded two albums both featuring his drummer Mark Freeman on cardboard box (an 'instrument' he had played live). Far from the electronic sound Barrett had been focussing on in the last decade, these two albums were more organic, specifically the second. Mound of Sound had been influenced and recorded on an old English burial mound and features much of the ambience and "feel" that those interring might have felt had they been born in the 21st century.

Barrett has been performing vocal and strings for Sleeping Dogz, a band that he formed with his partner, Mary Holland, and John Devine, and closed the Cambridge Folk Festival in 2003, 2004, 2005 and 2009. He toured autumn 2009 with John Otway and toured with Sleeping Dogz in April and May 2010.

In 2012, Barrett formed French Connection, using the Sleeping Dogz line-up, with the addition of French vocalist Aurora Colson. Their first live performance took place at The Flying Shack, Cheltenham on 9 November 2012. As of 2017, Barrett continues to tour.

== Discography ==
=== Albums, 1970s to 1990s ===
Name	Date	Format	With	Notes
John Otway & Wild Willy Barrett	May 1977	LP, CC	John Otway	
Deep & Meaningless	Jun 1978	LP, CC	John Otway	
Call of the Wild	Jun 1979	LP, CC	N/A – Solo	
Krazy Kong Album	Jun 1980	LP	N/A – Solo	Album of demos recorded during 1973, and studio tracks from 1979
Way & Bar	Aug 1980	LP	John Otway	
Organic Bondage	May 1986	LP	Stephen Two-Names	Produced in hand-made wooden sleeves for its initial release
The Wimp & The Wild	Aug 1989	LP	John Otway	
Black Cat Walking	Jun 1992	CC	N/A – Solo	
Open Toed and Flapping	Feb 1995	CD, CC	N/A – Solo	
Mound of Sound	1997	CD	N/A – Solo	

=== Albums, 2000s to 2020s ===
Name	Date	Format	With	Notes
Pure Willy	c. 2000	CD	N/A – Solo	
Gypsies Too	2002	CD	Sleeping Dogz	
Drum With No Ears	2004	CD	Sleeping Dogz	
Wildwood Traveller	Feb 2005	CD	Mary Holland	
One More for the Road	2010	CD	Sleeping Dogz	
The Recordings	Apr 2013	CD	French Connection	
Cat in a Circus	2014	CD	Wild Willy Barrett's French Connection	
Avant Garde Mange-Tout	2015	CD	Wild Willy Barrett's French Connection	
"A Mange-Tout Far"	2017	LP	Willy Barrett's French Connection	12" vinyl with hand sculpted wooden sleeve
