= The Irish Rovers in Australia =

1976 album by The Irish Rovers

Live album by The Irish Rovers
- Released: 1976
- Label: Attic

The Irish Rovers chronology
Children of the Unicorn (1976)	The Irish Rovers in Australia (1976)	Tall Ships and Salty Dogs (1979)

The Irish Rovers in Australia is a 1976 album by the Irish-Canadian music group The Irish Rovers. Despite the title being suggestive of live recordings in Australia, it consists of studio recordings of primarily Australian folk songs. The band members at that time were George Millar, Jimmy Ferguson, Joe Millar, Will Millar and Wicil McDowell.

== Track listing ==
Side 1

1. "South Australia"
2. "Orange and Green"
3. "Waltzing Matilda"
4. "The Unicorn"
5. "Come By The Hills"
6. "10,000 Miles Away"
7. "Click Go the Shears"
8. "Queensland Drovers"
9. "Whiskey on a Sunday"
10. "The Overlanders"

Side 2

1. "A Pub with No Beer"
2. "Black Velvet Band"
3. "Sunny Sydney Lady"
4. "Wild Colonial Boy"
5. "Drovers Dream"
6. "Wild Rover No More"
7. "Sydney Harbour Ferry Boat"
8. "Lazy Harry"
9. "Botany Bay"
10. "Biplane Evermore"
