= List of Irish Canadians =

The following is a list of notable Irish Canadians.

== List ==
- Eugenie Bouchard - Tennis player
- Jim Brennan - soccer player
- Chartres Brew - Gold commissioner, Chief Constable and judge in the Colony of British Columbia
- Ed Broadbent - politician and political scientist
- Morley Callaghan - novelist and playwright
- Mark Carney - governor of the Bank of Canada (2008-2013), governor of the Bank of England (2013-2020), Prime Minister of Canada (2025)
- Jordan Clark - dancer and actress
- D'Alton Corry Coleman (1879–1956), president of Canadian Pacific Railway
- Jim Coleman (1911–2001), Canadian sports journalist and Member of the Order of Canada
- Daniel Condren - YouTuber and Twitch live streamer known as RTGame
- Stompin' Tom Connors – country and folk musician
- Peter Cullen – voice actor
- Philip J. Currie - author and historian
- Peter Warren Dease - Arctic explorer
- Bernard Devlin - 19th-century lawyer, journalist, politician
- Elias Disney – the father of Roy and Walt Disney.
- Denny Doherty - singer and songwriter, The Mamas & the Papas
- Timothy Eaton - founder of Eaton's
- Jimmy Ferguson - musician, The Irish Rovers
- Michael Foley, Cyclist
- John Furlong - CEO of Vancouver Organizing Committee for the 2010 Olympic and Paralympic Winter Games
- Ryan Gosling - actor
- David Griffin (athlete) – Olympic athlete and journalist
- Shenae Grimes - actress
- Emm Gryner - guitarist, songwriter-singer
- Ciaran Hearn - rugby union player
- Jill Hennessy - actress
- W. A. Hewitt - sports executive and journalist, Hockey Hall of Fame inductee
- Walter Huston - actor
- Joshua Jackson - actor
- Rocky Johnson, professional wrestler and father of Dwayne ("The Rock") Johnson
- Jason Kenney - Premier Of Alberta
- Larkin Kerwin - Physicist, First Lay Rector of Université Laval, founding president of the Canadian Space Agency
- W. P. Kinsella - novelist and short story writer
- Paul Martin - 21st Prime Minister of Canada
- Bat Masterson - lawman
- Connor McDavid - NHL player
- James McGee - tennis player
- Thomas D'Arcy McGee – Father of Confederation
- Logan McGuinness - professional boxer
- Catherine McKenna - Minister of Environment and Climate Change of Canada
- Amybeth McNulty - actress
- George Millar - musician of The Irish Rovers
- Will Millar - musician, The Irish Rovers
- Tom Mulcair - politician, former Leader of Official Opposition
- Stefan Molyneux - far-right activist
- Ben Mulroney - television personality, host of etalk, and son of Brian Mulroney
- Brian Mulroney – 18th Prime Minister of Canada
- Alice Munro - author
- Owen Nolan - NHL player
- Eugene O'Keefe - Canadian businessman and philanthropist; born in Bandon, County Cork; founded the O'Keefe Brewery Company of Toronto Limited in 1891
- Kevin O'Leary - Businessman and television personality
- Seamus O'Regan - Canadian-Irish former television personality, and Member of Parliament
- Chauncey O'Toole - rugby union player
- Erin O'Toole - Canadian politician and leader of the opposition
- Lindi Ortega - singer-songwriter
- Gerard Parkes - actor
- John Draper Perrin - entrepreneur, mining executive
- Pierre Poilievre - leader of the Conservative Party and Official Opposition
- Johnny Reid - singer-songwriter
- Ryan Reynolds - actor
- Morgan Rielly - Hockey player for the Toronto Maple Leafs
- Pat Riordan - rugby union player
- Claude Ryan - Quebec Liberal Party leader
- Frank Ryan - gangster
- Louis St. Laurent - 12th Prime Minister of Canada
- Mack Sennett - producer, director, writer, actor and founder of Keystone Studios
- Martin Short - comedian, actor, singer and writer
- Sir John Thompson - 4th Prime Minister of Canada
- Daniel Tracey - doctor, journalist, politician
- Shania Twain - singer-songwriter
- Kevin Vickers - former ambassador and diplomat
- Galen Weston Jr. - businessman
- Mary Walsh – comedian
- Brandon Yip - ice hockey player

== See also ==
- Canada–Ireland relations
- Irish Montreal before the Great Famine
- List of Ireland-related topics

- Irish diaspora
- Irish Australians
- Irish (ethnicity)
