= The Very Best Of: The Dubliners =

Greatest hits album by The Dubliners
- Released: 2009
- Recorded: Various years: 1960s–1990s
- Genres: Irish traditional music, pub music
- Length: 1:03:44
- Labels: Universal, UJC Music

The Dubliners chronology
| Too Late To Stop Now: The Very Best Of The Dubliners (2006) | The Very Best Of: The Dubliners (2009) | 50 Years (2012) |

One of The Dubliners Compilation Albums charting at #16 in the UK Albums Chart.

== Track listing ==
| No. | Title | Length |
|---|---|---|
| 1. | "The Irish Rover" | 2:32 |
| 2. | "Whiskey in the Jar" | 1:50 |
| 3. | "Seven Drunken Nights" | 3:13 |
| 4. | "Molly Malone" | 2:57 |
| 5. | "The Wild Rover" | 3:14 |
| 6. | "Dirty Old Town" | 3:36 |
| 7. | "Mountain Dew" | 2:19 |
| 8. | "Rocky Road To Dublin" | 2:36 |
| 9. | "The Sick Note" | 2:54 |
| 10. | "Monto" | 2:55 |
| 11. | "The Masons Apron" | 3:58 |
| 12. | "Ragman's Ball" | 2:00 |
| 13. | "The Town I Loved So Well" | 6:25 |
| 14. | "Jar of Porter" | 1:41 |
| 15. | "Finnegan's Wake" | 2:30 |
| 16. | "The Leaving of Liverpool" | 4:42 |
| 17. | "Kitty Come down From Limerick" | 2:59 |
| 18. | "The Black Velvet Band" | 3:29 |
| 19. | "McAlpine's Fusiliers" | 3:15 |
| 20. | "Dicey Reilly" | 2:41 |

== Reviews ==
Professional ratings
Review scores
| Source | Rating |
|---|---|
| AllMusic | 3.5/5 stars |

== Chart performance ==
| Chart (2009) | Peak position |
|---|---|
| Scottish Albums (Official Charts) | 7 |
| UK Albums (Official Charts) | 16 |
| Irish Albums (IRMA) | 31 |

- The Dubliners – multiple records
