= 50 Years =

50 years
- 50 Years

Compilation album by The Dubliners
- Released: 19 November 2012
- Genre: Irish folk

The Dubliners chronology
The Very Best Of: The Dubliners (2009)	50 years (2012)

50 Years is an album by The Dubliners released on 19 November 2012. The album charted at No. 10 in Ireland, and received gold certification in December 2012 from the IRMA. The album was highly rated in the US, UK and across Europe. The album features songs by all members of the band.

== Track listing ==
Disc 1

1. "Seven Drunken Nights"
2. "Carrickfergus"
3. "The Spanish Lady"
4. "The Marino Waltz"
5. "Joe Hill"
6. "Fiddler's Green"
7. "Weile Waile"
8. "The Honeysuckle" / "The Golden Eagle"
9. "Raglan Road"
10. "Dirty Old Town"
11. "The Ferryman"
12. "Cill Chais"
13. "Lord Inchiquin"
14. "Scorn Not His Simplicity"
15. "Grace"
16. "The Auld Triangle"

Disc 2

1. "The Irish Rover"
2. "Free the People"
3. "Lord of the Dance"
4. "The Rose of Allendale"
5. "Farewell to Ireland"
6. "The Ragman's Ball"
7. "The Dublin Minstrel"
8. "Preab San Ol"
9. "Three Score and Ten"
10. "Dicey Reilly"
11. "Don't Get Married Girls"
12. "Song For Ireland"
13. "Cooley's Reel" / "The Dawn" / "The Mullingar Races"
14. "The Zoological Gardens"
15. "Cavan Girl"
16. "Springhill Mining Disaster"
17. "Molly Malone"

Disc 3

1. "Finnegan's Wake"
2. "The Black Velvet Band"
3. "Paddy On the Railway"
4. "The Showman's Fancy" / "The Wonder Hornpipe" / "The Swallow's Tail"
5. "The Sick Note"
6. "The Kerry Recruit"
7. "The Lark in the Morning"
8. "The Town I Loved So Well"
9. "The Mason's Apron"
10. "McAlpine's Fusiliers"
11. "Mrs McGrath"
12. "The Fields of Athenry"
13. "I Wish I Had Someone To Love Me"
14. "The Scholar" / "The Teetotaller" / "The High Reel"
15. "Whiskey in the Jar"
16. "The Wild Rover"
17. "Monto"

== Reviews ==
Professional ratings
Review scores
Source	Rating
The Guardian	4/5 stars
