= Jennifer Beech =

TV Host

Jennifer Beech is a Canadian television host. In the early 1990s she appeared on YTV as "PJ Jenn." She left YTV in 1994 to become the host of BBS Master Control which consisted of a line-up of children's programming from Walt Disney Animation Studios. She held that position until 1997 when she left to work on OLN.

Beech studied theatre at the University of Guelph, intending to get into public relations, event marketing, or sports promotion.

In 1992, YTV was looking to cast new PJs, the channel's term for Programming Jockeys, meant to parallel the Video Jockeys (VJs) of MuchMusic. Beech wasn't interested, but her mother encouraged her to audition, teaching her four guitar chords, and popular Victorian song "Star of the Evening". At YTV, she notes that she learned not only hosting skills, but all the elements dealt with by television crews, from lighting to production. PJ Jen was co-host of The Zone with PJ Phil, albeit appearing infrequently. Primarily, she was host of weekend morning programming.

Beech moved to the Baton Broadcasting System's then unnamed and conceptless children's programming block in 1995, feeling she had professionally grown as much was possible at YTV. Executives Ivan Fecan and Suzanne Steves were listed as behind her hiring. The program, eventually named Master Control, featured Jenn between Disney-produced television programs, and out in the Greater Toronto Area in taped segments. In fall 1996, Beech launched a show called Road Crew, aired late in the Saturday lineup. The series was an outdoor adventure series for pre-teens. When appearing at the CNE in 1996, she was still referred as PJ Jenn Beech.

In 1997, Beech left the program to work at OLN; her hosting duties were taken over by former child actress Melyssa Ade.

Her parents are singer Sandra Beech and advertising executive Len Beech, and her uncles are Will and George Millar of The Irish Rovers.
