= Lydia Pinkham =

American inventor (1819–1883)

Lydia E. Pinkham
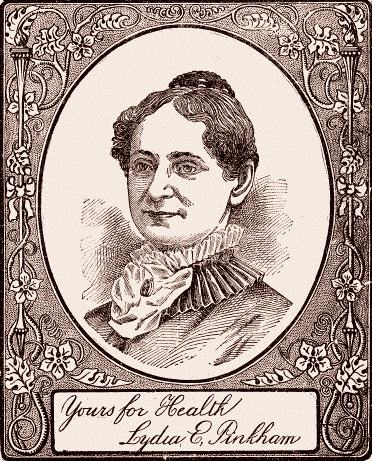
- Pinkham, from a 1904 pamphlet
- Born: Lydia Estes; February 9, 1819; Lynn, Massachusetts, U.S.
- Died: May 17, 1883 (aged 64)

Lydia Estes Pinkham (born Estes; February 9, 1819 – May 17, 1883) was an American inventor and marketer of a herbal-alcoholic "women's tonic" for menstrual and menopausal problems, which medical experts dismissed as a quack remedy, but which is still on sale today in a modified form.

It was the aggressive marketing of Pinkham's Vegetable Compound that raised its profile, while also rallying the skeptics. Long, promotional copy would dramatize "women's weakness", "hysteria", and other themes commonly referenced at the time. Pinkham urged women to write to her personally, and she would maintain the correspondence in order to expose the customer to more persuasive claims for the remedy. Clearly the replies were not all written by Pinkham herself, as they continued after her death.

Pinkham and her "medicinal compound" for feminine disorders became the subject of a bawdy drinking song, "Lily the Pink", of which a sanitized version became a number one hit by The Scaffold in the United Kingdom.

== Life and career ==
Pinkham was born in the manufacturing city of Lynn, Massachusetts, U.S., the tenth of the twelve children of William and Rebecca Estes. The Estes were an old Quaker family tracing their ancestry to one William Estes, a Quaker who migrated to America in 1676, and through him to the thirteenth-century Italian House of Este. William Estes was originally a shoemaker but by the time Lydia was born in 1819, he had become wealthy through dealing in real estate and had risen to the status of "gentleman farmer". Pinkham was educated at Lynn Academy and worked as a schoolteacher before her marriage in September 1843.

The Estes were a strongly abolitionist and anti-segregation family. The fugitive slave and abolitionist leader Frederick Douglass was a neighbor and a family friend. The Estes' household was a gathering place for local and visiting abolitionist leaders such as William Lloyd Garrison. The Estes broke from the Quakers over the slavery issue in the 1830s. Pinkham joined the Lynn Female Anti-slavery Society when she was sixteen. In the controversies which divided the abolitionist movement during the 1840s, Pinkham would support the feminist and moral persuasion positions of Nathaniel P. Rogers. Her children would continue in the anti-slavery tradition.

Isaac Pinkham was a 29-year-old shoe manufacturer when he married Lydia in 1843. He would try various businesses without much success, including real estate. Lydia gave birth to their first child, Charles Hacker Pinkham, in 1844. She lost their second child to gastroenteritis, but gave birth to their second surviving child, Daniel Rogers Pinkham, in 1848. A third son, William Pinkham, was born in 1852, and a daughter, Aroline Chase Pinkham, in 1857. All the Pinkham children would eventually be involved in the Pinkham medicine business.

Like many women of her time, Pinkham brewed home remedies for which she continually collected recipes. Her remedy for "female complaints" became very popular among her neighbors to whom she gave it away. One story is that her husband was given the recipe as part payment for a debt. Whatever truth may be in this, the ingredients of her remedy were generally consistent with the herbal knowledge available to her through such sources as King's American Dispensatory, which she is known to have owned and used.

In Pinkham's time and place, the reputation of the medical profession was lax. Medical fees were too expensive for most Americans to afford except in emergencies. In some cases, the remedies were more likely to kill than cure. For example, a common "medicine", calomel, was in fact not a medicine, but instead a deadly mercurial toxin. Although mercury was not an ingredient of Pinkham's compound, the unreliable nature of medicines was sufficiently well known to be the subject of a popular comic song. In these circumstances, many preferred to trust unlicensed "root and herb" practitioners, and especially to trust women who were prepared to share their domestic remedies, such as Pinkham.

Isaac Pinkham was ruined financially in the economic depression of the early 1870s. The fortunes of the Pinkham family had long been patchy, but they now entered on hard times. In 1875, the idea of making a family business of the remedy was formed. Lydia initially made the remedy on her stove before its success enabled production to be transferred to a factory. She answered letters from customers and probably wrote most of the advertising copy. Mass marketed from 1876, on, Lydia E. Pinkham's Vegetable Compound became one of the best known patent medicines of the 19th century. Descendants of this product are still available today. Pinkham's skill was in marketing her product directly to women, and her company continued her shrewd marketing tactics after her death. Her own face was on the label, and her company was particularly keen on the use of testimonials from grateful women. Some of these women's stories were published in the Lydia E. Pinkham Medicine Company's pamphlet Pinkham Pioneers.

Advertising copy urged women to write to Pinkham. They did, and they received answers. They continued to write and receive answers for decades after Pinkham's own death. These staff-written answers combined forthright talk about women's medical issues, advice, and, of course, recommendations for the company product. In 1905, the Ladies' Home Journal published a photograph of Pinkham's tombstone and exposed the ruse. The Pinkham company insisted that it had never meant to imply that the letters were being answered by Lydia Pinkham, but by her daughter-in-law, Jennie Pinkham.

Although Pinkham's motives were economic, many modern-day feminists admire her for distributing information on menstruation and the "facts of life", and they consider her to be a crusader for women's health issues in a day when women were poorly served by the medical establishment. The Lydia Pinkham House, located near her factory on Western Ave in Lynn, Massachusetts, was placed on the National Register of Historic Places September 25, 2012. In 1922, Lydia's daughter Aroline Pinkham Chase Gove founded the Lydia E. Pinkham Memorial Clinic, at 250 Derby St. in Salem, Massachusetts, to provide health services to young mothers and their children. The clinic has been controlled since 1990 by Stephen Nathan Doty, a fourth-generation descendant of Lydia, who also uses the memorial building as his personal residence. The clinic is in operation as of 2025. It is designated Site 9 of the Salem Women's Heritage Trail.

== Lydia E. Pinkham's Vegetable Compound ==
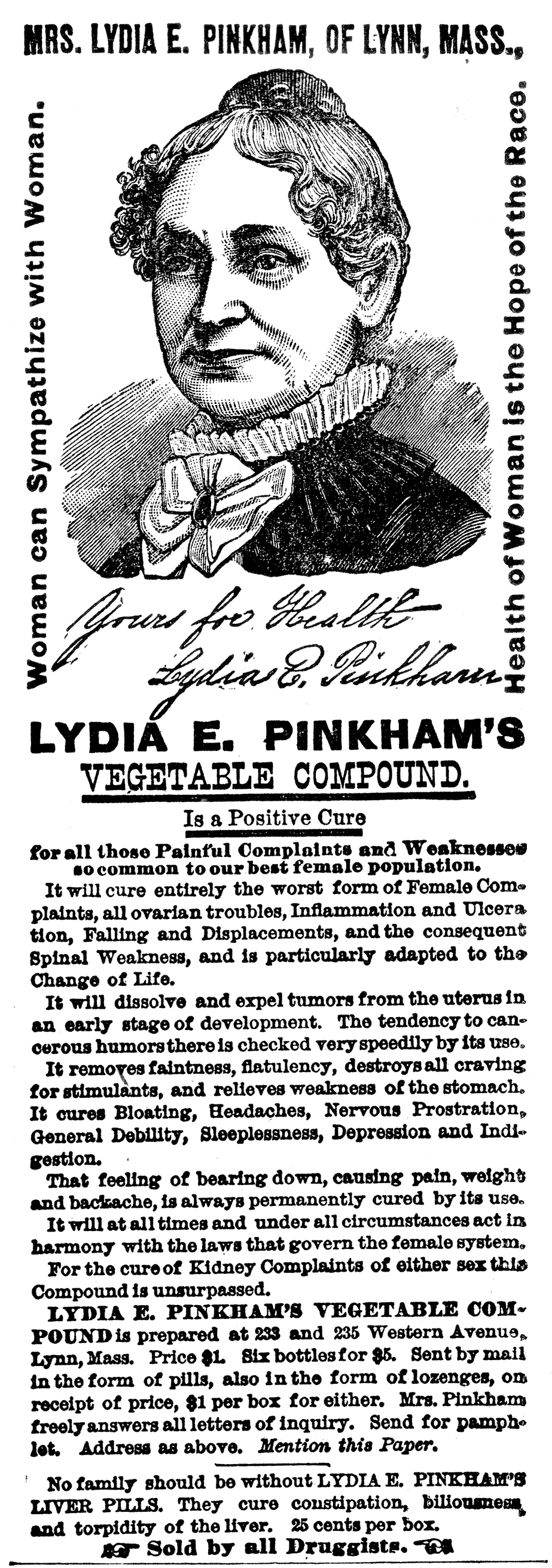
1882 ad for Lydia Pinkham's Vegetable Compound

The five herbs contained in Pinkham's original formula are:

- Pleurisy root is diaphoretic, anti-spasmodic, carminative, and anti-inflammatory.
- Life root is a traditional uterine tonic, diuretic, anti-inflammatory, and emmenagogue used for amenorrhea or dysmenorrhea.
- Fenugreek is vulnerary, anti-inflammatory, anti-spasmodic, tonic, emmenagogue, galactogogue, and hypotensive.
- Unicorn Root was used by several Native American tribes for dysmenorrhea, uterine prolapse, pelvic congestion, and to improve ovarian function.
- Black cohosh is an emmenagogue, anti-spasmodic, restorative, nervine, and hypotensive and is used traditionally for menopausal symptoms.

The formula also contains drinking alcohol, which relieves muscular stress, reduces pain, and can affect mood.

Of the newer additions, motherwort is a nervine, emmenagogue, anti-spasmodic, hepatic, cardiac tonic, and hypotensive. Piscidia erythrina (Jamaican dogwood) is an eclectic remedy effective for painful spasms, pelvic pain, dysmenorrhea, and ovarian pain. Licorice is anti-inflammatory, anti-hepatotoxic, anti-spasmodic, and a mild laxative. Gentian is a sialagogue, hepatic, cholagogue, anthelmintic, and emmenagogue. Dandelion is a potassium-sparing diuretic, hepatic, cholagogue, anti-rheumatic, laxative, tonic, and a bitter.

Advertisements for Lydia E. Pinkham's Vegetable Compound included popular myths of women's health, problematizing "women's weakness" of emotionality and "hysteria". Some of the original product advertised such notions as encouraging sexual activity with husbands, encouraging reproduction, and "restoring women's pep" so that they might prove better wives and mothers.

Medical experts dismissed Pinkham's claims as quackery. In 1922, it was described as a "valueless preparation kept on the market for about fifty years by means of lying advertisements and worthless testimonials."

The popularity of Pinkham's compound long after her death is testament to its acceptance by women who sought relief from menstrual and menopausal symptoms. The company continued under family control until the 1930s. Although Lydia Pinkham's company continued increasing profit margins 50 years after her death, eventually the advent of the Food and Drug Administration (FDA) caused changes in the formula.

In 2005–6 the National Institutes of Health performed a "12-month randomized, double-blind, placebo-controlled trial, [which] compared several herbal regimens and menopausal hormone therapy (estrogen with or without progesterone) to placebo in women ages 45 to 55 [...] Newton and colleagues found no significant difference between the number of daily hot flashes and/or night sweats in any of the herbal supplement groups when compared to the placebo group."

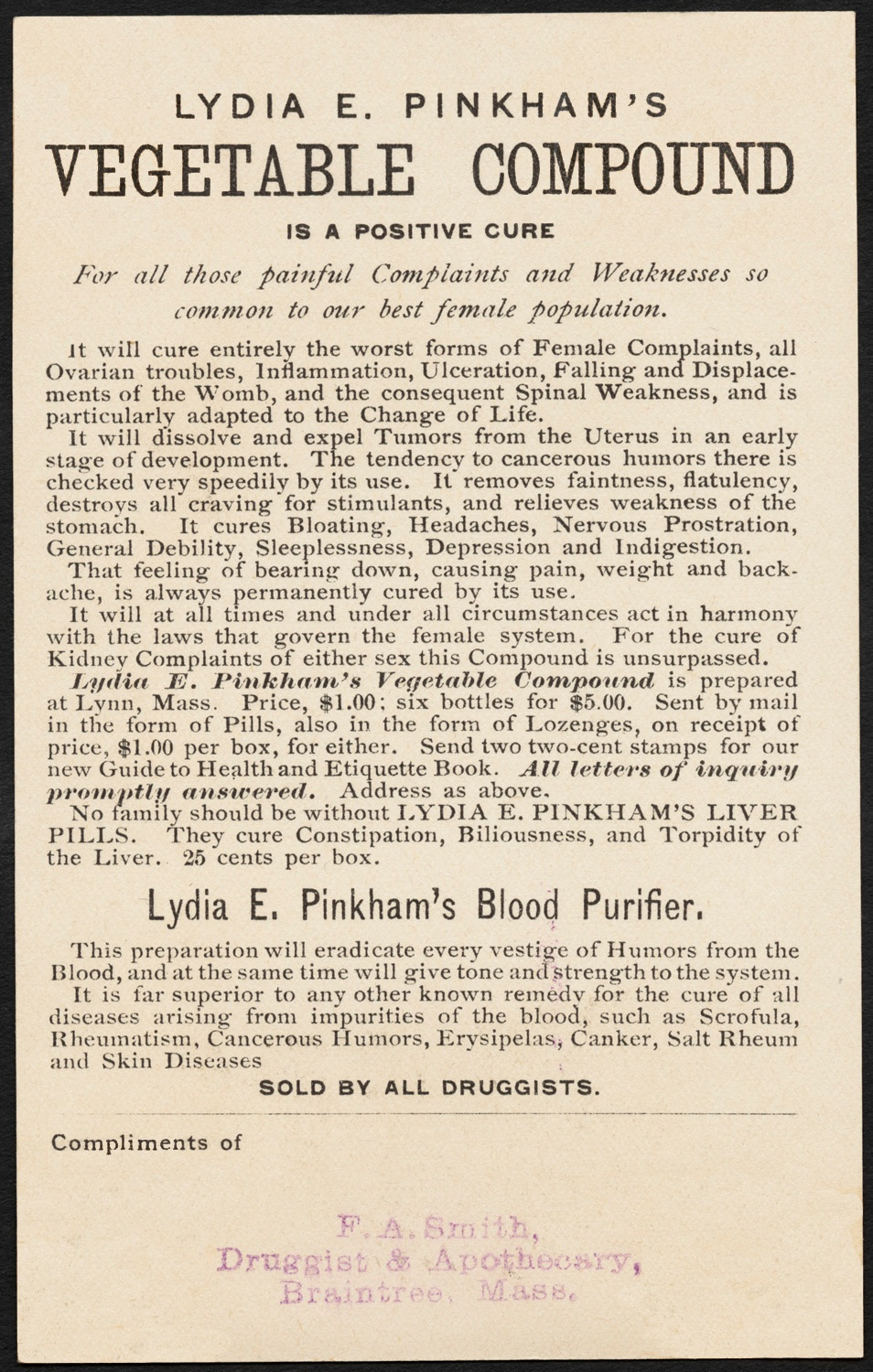
Claims for the Vegetable Compound, from a 19th-century American trade card

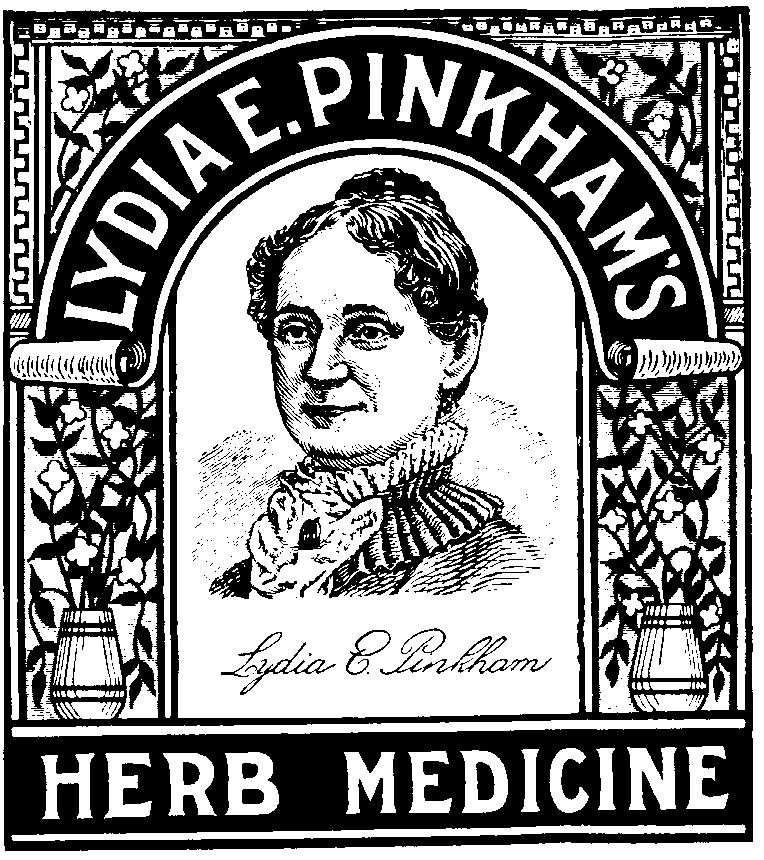
Label from a box of medicine

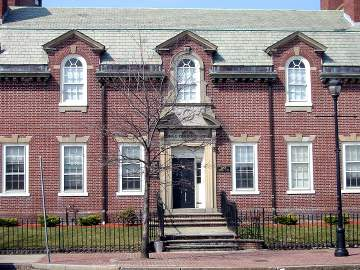
Lydia Pinkham Memorial Clinic in Salem, Massachusetts

== Original product and modern descendants ==
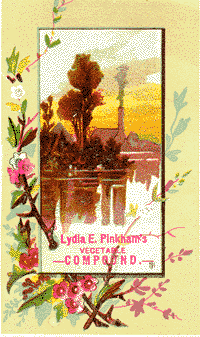
Lydia Pinkham's Vegetable Compound

The original formula for Lydia Pinkham's Vegetable Compound was:

- Unicorn root (Aletris farinosa L.) 8 oz.
- Life root (Senecio aureus L.) 6 oz.
- Black cohosh (Cimicifuga racemosa (L.) Nutt.) 6 oz.
- Pleurisy root (Asclepias tuberosa L.) 6 oz.
- Fenugreek seed (Trigonella foenum-graecum L.) 12 oz.
- Alcohol (18%) to make 100 U.S. pints

As of 2004, Numark Laboratories of Edison, New Jersey, markets a similar product named "Lydia Pinkham Herbal Compound". The product is carried by the Walgreens, CVS and Rite Aid drugstore chains. Ingredients listed in this product are:

- Motherwort (Leonurus cardiaca)
- Gentian (Gentiana lutea)
- Jamaican dogwood (Piscidia piscipula)
- Pleurisy root (Asclepias tuberosa)
- Licorice (Glycyrrhiza glabra)
- Black cohosh (Cimicifuga racemosa)
- Dandelion (Taraxacum officinale)

Time of Your Life Nutraceuticals of St. Petersburg, Florida, produces a product named "Lydia's Secret" for Lydiapinkham.org. Said to be "based on" the original formula, it has these listed ingredients

- Black cohosh root (Cimicifuga racemosa)
- Dandelion root (Taraxacum officinale)
- Pleurisy root (Asclepias tuberosa)
- Chastetree berry (Vitex agnus-castus)
- False unicorn root (Chamaelirium luteum)
- Jamaica dogwood bark (Piscidia piscipula)
- Gentian root (Gentiana lutea)
- Vitamin E
- Vitamin B6
- Magnesium
- Zinc

== In popular culture ==
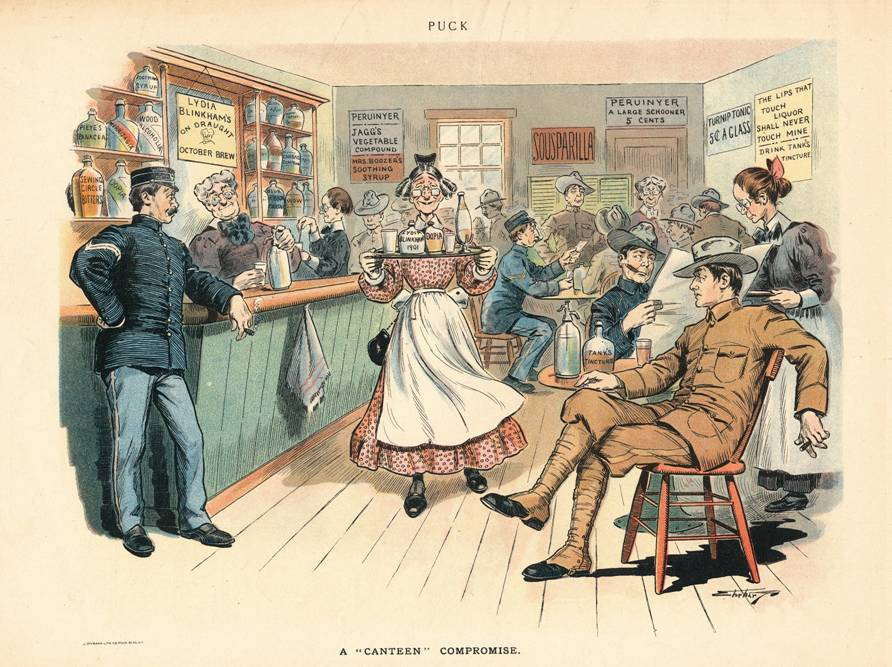
A Puck cartoon of 1906 depicts "Lydia Blinkham" (a caricature of Pinkham) serving her medicine to soldiers as a "canteen compromise", i.e. as a substitute for true alcoholic drinks.

Pinkham and her "medicinal compound" are memorialized in the folk song "The Ballad of Lydia Pinkham", also known as "Lily the Pink" (Roud number 8368). There is no definitive version, but one variant is reported to have been sung at the University of Pennsylvania in 1902–03, and another is ascribed to Canadian soldiers during World War I. Drinking songs describing the humorous invigorating effects of some food or medicine form are widespread, and the fact that Pinkham's medicine was marketed for "female complaints" made it especially vulnerable to ribald fantasies about what it might cure. A further reason that a humble women's tonic could become the subject of such a song – and an increasing success in the twenties and early thirties – was its availability as a 40 proof drink during the Prohibition era.

A sanitized version, "Lily the Pink", was a number one hit for The Scaffold in the United Kingdom in 1968/69. The Irish Rovers also released the Scaffold version of the song in 1969, on the album Tales to Warm Your Mind and, as a single, it reached #113 on the US Billboard charts. The song was successfully adapted into French in 1969 by Richard Anthony, humorously describing the devastating effects of a so-called "panacée" (universal medicine).

== General and cited references ==
- Holbrook, Stewart (1959). "The Lady of Lynn, Mrs. Pinkham". The Golden Age of Quackery. New York: Macmillan. pp. 63–70.
- Stage, Sarah (1979). Female Complaints: Lydia Pinkham and the Business of Women's Medicine. New York: W. W. Norton and Co. ISBN 0-393-00033-8. OCLC 7999871.
