= The Rovers =

The Rovers may refer to:

- The Irish Rovers, Canadian-Irish folk group created in 1963 that renamed itself The Rovers for part of the 1980s
- The Rovers (album), 1980 album by the above group
- The Rovers (TV series), Australian television series
- Rovers (TV series), British television series
- Blackburn Rovers F.C., English Premier League football (soccer) club
- Mars rover, explorer craft on the planet Mars
- Rovers Return Inn, a fictional pub on the British television soap opera Coronation Street
