= 50 Years (disambiguation) =

50 Years is a 2012 album by The Dubliners.

50 Years or Fifty Years may also refer to:

- "50 Years" (song), by Uncanny X-Men, 1985
- 50 Years, an album by Happy Goodman Family, 2000
- Fifty Years: The Artistry of Tony Bennett, an album by Tony Bennett, 2004
- "50 Years", a song by Adam Sandler, 2025

== See also ==
- Fifty-Year Peace Treaty
