= Ich bin ein Musikante =

Cumulative folk song

"Ich bin ein Musikante" (lit. 'I am a musician' or 'minstrel') is a German cumulative folksong, first published in 1838. It has been loosely translated into many languages, including two English translations: "I Am a Fine Musician" (1949) popularised by The Dick Van Dyke Show, and "The Music Man" (1951), which has become a well known song in England.

== History ==
"Ich bin ein Musikante" was collected in Silesia by Ludwig Erk and Wilhelm Irmer, and published in Die deutschen Volkslieder mit ihren Singweisen (1838).

== Song structure and lyrics ==
The original German version begins with the first person in the group singing:

Ich bin ein Musikante und komm' aus Schwabenland.

Translation:

I am a musician and come from Swabia.

The rest of the group then sings:

Wir sind auch Musikanten und kommen aus Schwabenland.

Translation:

We are also musicians and come from Swabia.

The first person then sings:

Ich kann auch blasen/schlagen/etc.,

Translation:

I can also play [blow/hit/etc.],

Then the group:

wir können auch blasen/schlagen/etc.,

Translation:

we can also play [blow/hit/etc.],

The first person then sings the name of an instrument, which the rest of the group repeats, followed by a comical version of the sound the instrument makes.

The above verse is then sung by the second person in the group, who chooses a different instrument. At the end of each verse, each person who has already sung then sings the sound of their own instrument, starting with the first person who sang, and ending with the person who just sang the verse.

The example instruments given in Erk and Irmer's 1838 version are:

- die Trompete ('the trumpet'): "tengteng-tereng"
- die Posaune ('the trombone'): "pumpumberum"
- die Flöte ('the flute'): whistles
- die Clarinette ('the clarinette'): "he he he he"
- das Fagott ('the bassoon'): purrs with lips
- die Pauken ('the kettledrums'): "berumbumbum"
- der Triangel ('the triangle'): "tingtingterling"
- das Klavier ('the piano'): "didideldidi"
- die Violine ('the violin'): "simsimserlim"

== Translations ==
=== "I Am a Fine Musician" ===
"I Am a Fine Musician" is an American translation of this song, by Felix Günther for The Children's Record Guild (starting "I am a fine musician, I travel through the world"), and sung by George Rasely and Mardi Bryant as "The Musicians" on the record Sing Along (1949). Charles Randolph Grean decided to produce a version of this song; he recruited Tom Glazer to write it (starting "I am a fine musician, I practice every day"), and it was performed by Dinah Shore, Betty Hutton, Tony Martin, and Phil Harris as The Musicians (1951). This was later performed on The Dick Van Dyke Show (6 March and 18 December 1963), and Sesame Street (21 November 1969). A variant of the song, ("I am a fine musician; I travel 'round the world.") was included in Marion Grayson's Let's Do Fingerplays (1962), and was mentioned by Henry Miller. A related version "I am a young musician, from London I have come", was published in Die schönsten Lieder 2 (1995), with the first line rhyming with the instrument ("from London I have come ... drum"; "I come from old Berlin ... violin", and so on).

The song was also prominent on Barney and Friends and used in different ways. In the episode Practice Makes Music, Barney demonstrates various instruments (violin, clarinet, trumpet, trombone). In Hola, Mexico!, the children demonstrated fiesta instruments (guitar, guiro, claves, maracas) and the song was arranged in a salsa style. The song was also used in Barney's Magical Musical Adventure and Barney Live in New York City.

=== "The Music Man" ===
A British version, "The Music Man", was translated and arranged by George Coote and Harold Packham in 1951, for the Tonic Music Company of London. It was recorded in May that year by Billy Cotton and his band, and in October by The Radio Revellers. The Irish Rovers covered the song for Children of the Unicorn (1976). By the time of Barbara Ireson and Christopher Rowe's book Over and Over Again (1978), it was thought to be a traditional song. The song was recorded by Black Lace, a British pop group from Ossett in West Yorkshire, in 1989 and reached #52 in the UK singles charts.

Each verse begins with the following chorus lines, divided between the lead singer ("The Music Man") and the audience. There are variations which follow roughly the same tune:

The Music Man: "I am the music man, And I come from down your way and I can play!"
Audience: "What can you play?"

The line "I come from down your way" is found in the original 1951 recordings. Some later versions change this line to "I come from far away".

For each verse the participants act out different instruments with specific actions. Some of the actions for the adult version can be rude or crude. They may also attempt to imitate the sound of each instrument. It is sometimes performed in cabaret with the audience challenging the artistes to ever more extravagant – and difficult – renditions of, for example, the flugelhorn.

After each verse, singers sing the previous verses in reverse order before singing the main chorus lines again.

=== "Vi äro musikanter" ===
"Vi äro musikanter" is a Swedish translation, typically sung when dancing around the Christmas tree and the Midsummer pole. It was written down early in Folklekar från Västergötland (1908–1934), published by Sven Lampa. It is a so-called "mimic song", where those singing it can mimic playing the different musical instruments mentioned in the song lyrics.

An early recording was done by Gösta Jonsson and Britt Berg, appearing in a medley of Christmas songs recorded in Berlin in September 1933, and released on a record later that year.

The song has been published several times, including:

- Julens önskesångbok, 1997, under the title "Tjugondag Knut dansar julen ut", credited as a "folk game"
- Barnens svenska sångbok, 1999, under the title "Sång med lek och dans"

== Related songs ==
Other similar songs, perhaps based to varying extents on the original German version, include Peter Kennedy's "The German Musicianer" in Folk Songs of Britain and Northern Ireland (1975), and Walter Greenaway's "The Wonderful Musician" (1871), which has a chorus that begins: "A big drum, a kettle drum, the fiddle, flute, and piccolo, piano, harp, harmonium and many more beside".
