= My Old Man's a Dustman =

1960 single by Lonnie Donegan

- Sleeve for the Scandinavian pressing on Metronome Records

Single by Lonnie Donegan
- B-side: "The Golden Vanity"
- Released: 16 March 1960
- Recorded: 20 February 1960, Gaumont Cinema, Doncaster
- Genre: Folk, music hall, pop
- Length: 3:21
- Label: Pye Records
- Songwriters: Lonnie Donegan, Peter Buchanan, Beverly Thorn
- Producers: Alan A. Freeman, Michael Barclay

Lonnie Donegan singles chronology
| "San Miguel" (1959) | "My Old Man's a Dustman" (1960) | "I Wanna Go Home" (1960) |

"My Old Man's a Dustman" is a song first recorded by the British skiffle singer Lonnie Donegan. It reached number one in the British, Irish, Australian, Canadian, and New Zealand singles charts in 1960.

The chorus of the song is:

Oh, my old man's a dustman
He wears a dustman's hat
He wears cor blimey trousers
And he lives in a council flat

== Composition ==
The song was written by Lonnie Donegan, Peter Buchanan (Donegan's manager between 1956 and 1962), and Beverly Thorn; Thorn was not credited on the original release. According to his autobiography, Beverley Thorn was a pseudonym of the songwriter Leslie Bricusse.

It probably has its origins in "My Father Was a Fireman", a song sung by British World War I troops. The two songs share a lyrical similarity in their reference to "cor blimey trousers". It also was a popular shanty, as versions included references to the Elder Dempster shipping line; in the 1950 film Waterfront, the character played by Robert Newton sings "My old man's a fireman on Elder Dempster boat; he wears cor-blimey trousers and a little cor-blimey hat" as he abandons his family for the sea. A song beginning with the line "My old man's a dustman", but otherwise sharing no lyrics with Donegan's, is recorded as a playground song in the 1956 novel My Old Man's a Dustman by Wolf Mankowitz. This song tells of the exploits of the protagonist at the Battle of Mons. A version concerning a football game and beginning "My old man's a scaffie [dustman or street-sweeper, from scavenger]/He wears a scaffie's hat" (echoing the first two lines of Donegan's song) is recorded as a Scottish playground song during the 1950s. A very similar song, beginning "My old man's a baker", is recorded in Chester-le-Street in 1967. All of these songs share the same metric structure.

The melody is borrowed from the theme starting at around 2 minutes and 20 seconds into the music for the ballet Petrushka, composed by Igor Stravinsky.

The song represented a change in style for Donegan, away from American folk and towards British music hall.

== Single release ==
On 16 March 1960, through Pye Records in the UK, Donegan released a version of the song recorded live at the Gaumont cinema in Doncaster just a few weeks earlier, on 20 February. The B-side was a version of the English folk song "The Golden Vanity". The single reached number one in the UK Singles Chart on 31 March and maintained that position for four weeks. It also reached number one in Ireland, Australia, New Zealand, and on the Canadian CHUM Chart for 2 weeks, selling over a million copies in total.

== Cover versions ==
In 1960, a Dutch version was released by Toby Rix. Also in 1960, a parody version, "My Old Man's An All-Black", was released in New Zealand by the Howard Morrison Quartet in reaction to the New Zealand rugby tour of Apartheid-era South Africa. The song was performed by the Bee Gees on the Australian TV show Bandstand in 1963, and, in the US, the Smothers Brothers included a parody based on the song on their LP Think Ethnic. In 1966, The Irish Rovers included a version of the song on their LP The First of the Irish Rovers.

A parody version titled ‘My Old Man’s a Provo’, by Gerry O’Glacain of the Irish Brigade, became one of the most popular Irish republican rebel folk songs in the latter part of the twentieth century.

The tune to the chorus has become a popular football chant in recent years. For example, Arsenal supporters sang "Arsène Wenger's magic, he wears a magic hat, and when he saw the double, he said 'I'm having that!'" at the end of their double winning season in 2002; Chelsea fans later adopted it after ex-Arsenal player Cesc Fabregas assisted the Blues in securing a double of their own in 2015.
