= The Irish Rovers Live =

1972 album by The Irish Rovers

Live album by The Irish Rovers
- Released: 1972

The Irish Rovers chronology
The Best of the Irish Rovers (1972)	The Irish Rovers Live (1972)	Emigrate! Emigrate! (1975)

The Irish Rovers Live is a 1972 album by The Irish Rovers.

== Track listing ==
Side One:

1. "What Wid Ye Do"
2. "I'm a Rambler"
3. "Step It Out Mary"
4. "We'll Rant and We'll Roar"
5. "Sweet Thames Flow Softly"
6. "Windy Old Weather"

Side Two:

1. "Valparaiso"
2. "Lord of the Dance"
3. "Barley Mow"
4. "When the Shipyards Go Back on Full Time"
5. "Morning Town Ride"
6. "Road to Gundagai"
