= The Unicorn (album) =

Studio album by The Irish Rovers
- Released: 1967
- Genre: Irish folk music
- Length: 30:06
- Label: Decca
- Producer: Charles "Bud" Dant

The Irish Rovers chronology
The First of the Irish Rovers (1966)	The Unicorn (1967)	All Hung Up (1968)

Singles from The Unicorn
- 1. "The Unicorn" Released: January 1968

The Unicorn is the debut studio album of the Canadian Irish folk music group The Irish Rovers, released in 1967 and topped the charts in 1968.

The title track "The Unicorn", a recording of Shel Silverstein's poem based on Noah's Ark, featured Glen Campbell on lead guitar, and reached #2 in the US Adult Contemporary Charts, #7 in the U.S. Hot 100, #4 in Canada, and #5 in Ireland. Despite having virtually nothing to do with Ireland or Irish culture, the song remains popular in Irish pubs to this day.

"The Unicorn" song is also included on The Irish Rovers Gems double disk (1996), their 40th Anniversary CD, 40 Years A-Rovin' (Rover Records, 2005), and their Home in Ireland CD and DVD. In 1968 the song was covered by Irish trio The Bachelors.

== Track listing ==
1. "The Unicorn" – 3:18
2. "Bonnie Kellswater" – 2:39
3. "The Orange and the Green" – 2:37
4. "Hiring Fair" – 2:28
5. "Bridget Flynn" – 1:58
6. "Come In" – 1:46
7. "Goodbye Mrs. Durkin" – 2:34
8. "Pat of Mullingar" – 2:34
9. "The Wind that Shakes the Corn" – 3:03
10. "The First Love in Life" – 2:50
11. "The Black Velvet Band" – 3:43
