= Rover Records =

Canadian independent record label

Rover Records is a Canadian independent record label founded in 1993. The company was developed to produce musical releases of The Irish Rovers and is owned and operated by Irish Rovers founding member George Millar.

== Album list ==
- Celebrate! The First Thirty Years (1994)
- The Next Thirty Years (1995)
- Irish Rovers Gems (1996)
- Come Fill Up Your Glasses (1998)
- Songs of Christmas (1999)
- Down By The Lagan Side (2000)
- Another Round (2002)
- Live in Concert (2003)
- 40 Years A-Rovin' (2003)
- Still Rovin' After All These Years (2007)
- Gracehill Fair (2010)
- Home In Ireland (2011)
- Merry Merry Time Of Year (2011)
- Drunken Sailor (2012)
