= Emigrate! Emigrate! =

Studio album by The Irish Rovers
- Released: 1975
- Genre: Irish folk
- Label: Attic
- Producer: Dennis R. Murphy

The Irish Rovers chronology
Children of the Unicorn (1973)	Emigrate! Emigrate! (1975)	The Irish Rovers in Australia (1976)

Emigrate! Emigrate! is a 1975 album by the music group The Irish Rovers. The album cover was nominated for a Juno Award.

== Track listing ==
Side 1:

1. "The Passing of the Gale"
2. "Yellow Gals"
3. "Paddy's Green Shamrock Shore"
4. "Farewell to Carlingford"
5. "Mary of Dungloe"
6. "Emigration Medley"

Side 2:

1. "Cobblers"
2. "Paddy On the Railway"
3. "Canadian Railroad Trilogy"(Gordon Lightfoot)
4. "Northern Rake"
5. "Children of Hate"
6. "Catch Another Butterfly"
7. "The Gypsy"
8. "60 Seconds to Get Out: When Irish Eyes Are Smiling / Too Ra Loo Ra Loo Ral (That's an Irish Lullaby)"
