= Lily the Pink (song) =

1968 song based on "The Ballad of Lydia Pinkham"

Single by The Scaffold

from the album L. The P.
- B-side: "Buttons Of Your Mind"
- Released: 10 October 1968
- Recorded: 9 August 1968
- Studio: EMI, London
- Genre: Music hall; comedy rock
- Length: 4:23
- Label: Parlophone R 5734
- Songwriters: John Gorman; Mike McGear; Roger McGough
- Producer: Norrie Paramor

The Scaffold singles chronology
| "1–2–3" (1968) | "Lily the Pink" (1968) | "Charity Bubbles" (1969) |

Audio sample
- Lily The Pink: file; help

"Lily the Pink" is a 1968 song released by the UK comedy group The Scaffold, which reached No. 1 in the UK Singles Chart and was the Christmas number one that year. It is a modernisation of an older folk song titled "The Ballad of Lydia Pinkham". The lyrics celebrate the "medicinal compound" invented by Lily the Pink, and humorously chronicle the "efficacious" cures it has brought about, such as inducing morbid obesity to cure a weak appetite.

== Background and writing ==
The Scaffold's rendition of "Lily The Pink" was recorded on 9 August 1968 at the EMI Studios in London. Backing vocalists on the recording included Graham Nash (of The Hollies), Elton John (then Reg Dwight of Bluesology) and Tim Rice; while Jack Bruce (of Cream) played the bass guitar and Clem Cattini drummed. Arrangements were done by former Manfred Mann member Mike Vickers alongside the Scaffold's members.

The lyrics include a number of in-jokes. For example, the line "Mr Frears had sticky-out ears" refers to film director Stephen Frears, who had worked with The Scaffold early in their careers; while the line "Jennifer Eccles had terrible freckles" refers to the song "Jennifer Eccles" by The Hollies, the band Graham Nash was about to leave.

"Lily The Pink" was released on 10 October 1968 and carried the B-side "Buttons Of Your Mind". It became No. 1 in the UK Singles Chart for the four weeks encompassing the Christmas holidays that year, becoming not only that year's Christmas number one, but also the first novelty song to achieve the position.

== Charts ==
| Chart (1968–1969) | Peak position |
|---|---|
| Australia (Go-Set) | 1 |
| Austria (Ö3 Austria Top 40) | 5 |
| Belgium (Ultratop 50 Flanders) | 5 |
| Canada (RPM) | 60 |
| Ireland (IRMA) | 1 |
| Netherlands (Dutch Top 40) | 2 |
| New Zealand (Listener) | 1 |
| Norway (VG-lista) | 8 |
| South Africa (Springbok Radio) | 2 |
| UK Singles (Official Charts) | 1 |
| West Germany (GfK) | 5 |

== Covers and adaptations ==
The Irish Rovers released the song in North America a few months after The Scaffold's version. It reached No. 38 in Canada on 7 April, and No. 113 in the United States in early 1969. It also rose to the Top 20 on the Easy Listening charts of both nations. The release from the Rovers' Tales to Warm Your Mind Decca LP became a second-favourite behind "The Unicorn".

The song was successfully adapted into French (as "Le sirop typhon") by Richard Anthony in 1969. In Quebec, it was adapted as "Monsieur Bong Bong", and mocked the Hong Kong flu pandemic of 1968–1969.

In April 1969, the Catalan group La Trinca started their career with the song Au vinga, arriba la Trinca, an adaptation of the song, still popular today in Catalonia.

== Earlier folk song ==
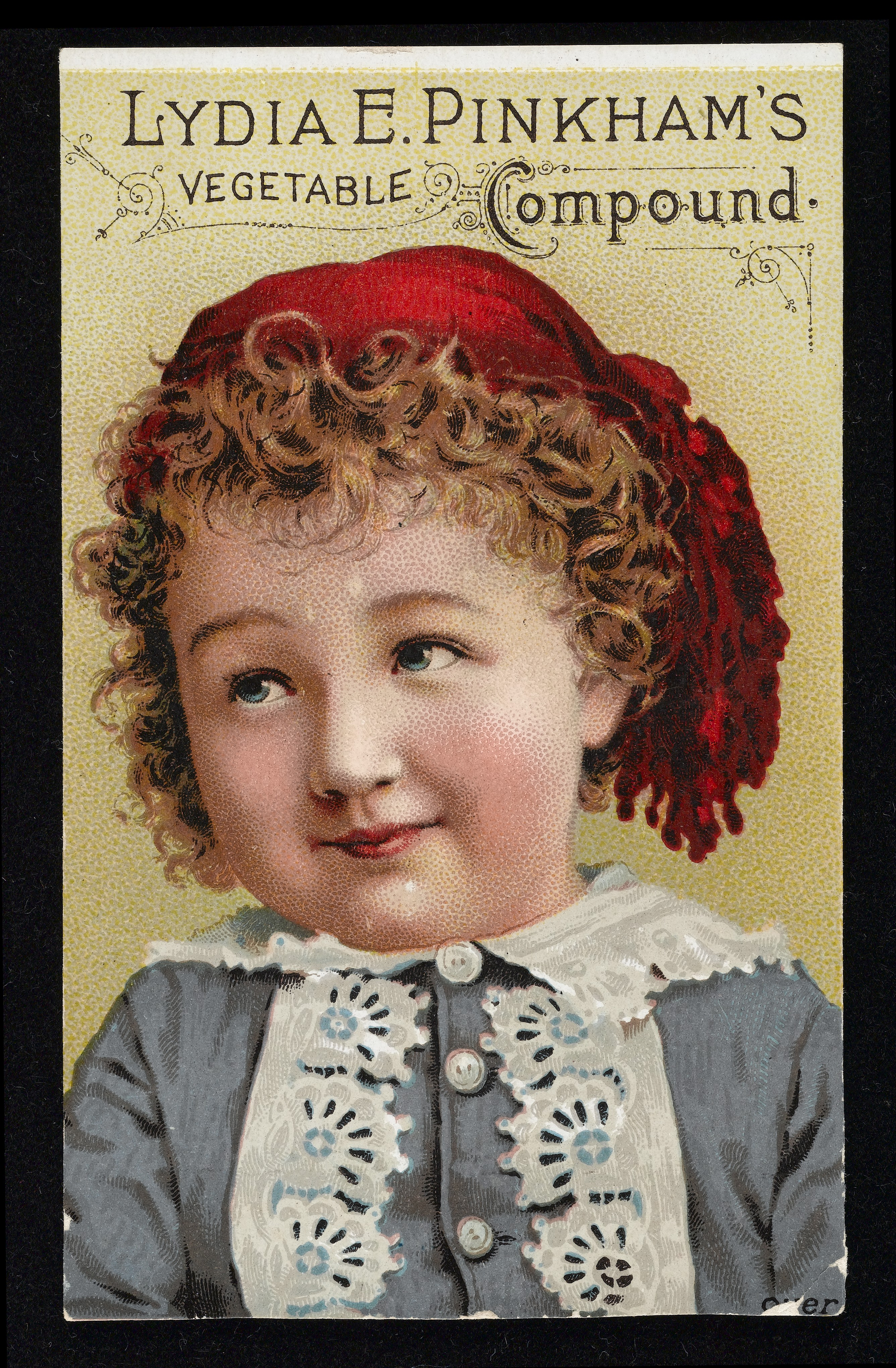
Advertisement for Lydia E. Pinkham's Vegetable Compound, 1880s

The American folk (or drinking) song on which "Lily the Pink" is based is generally known as "Lydia Pinkham" or "The Ballad of Lydia Pinkham". It has the Roud number 8368. The song was inspired by Lydia E. Pinkham's Vegetable Compound, a well-known herbal-alcoholic patent medicine for women. Supposed to relieve menstrual and menopausal pains, the compound was mass-marketed in the United States from 1876 onwards.

In his Autobiography (1951), William Carlos Williams remembers singing the song when at the University of Pennsylvania with Ezra Pound (1902–03). The song was certainly in existence by the time of the First World War. F. W. Harvey records it being sung in officers' prisoner-of-war camps in Germany, and ascribes it to Canadian prisoners. According to Harvey, the words of the first verse ran:

Have you heard of Lydia Pinkum,
And her love for the human race?
How she sells (she sells, she sells) her wonderful compound,
And the papers publish her face?

In many versions, the complaints which the compound had cured were ribald in nature. During the Prohibition era (1920–33) in the United States, the medicine (like other similar patent medicines) had a particular appeal as a readily available 40-proof alcoholic drink, and it is likely that this aided the popularity of the song. A version of the song was the unofficial regimental song of the British Royal Tank Corps during World War II.

== Cultural references ==
At the 2019 Brecon and Radnorshire by-election, Berni Benton, a novelty candidate, stood for the Official Monster Raving Loony Party under the name "Lady Lily the Pink". She polled 334 votes (1.05% of those cast), placing her in 5th place out of 6.

== See also ==
- List of number-one singles of 1968 (Ireland)
- List of number-one singles from the 1960s (UK)
- List of number-one singles in Australia during the 1960s
