= Gracehill Fair =

Studio album by The Irish Rovers
- Released: 2010
- Recorded: Island Pacific Studios, Nanaimo, B.C., Canada and Emerald Studios, Belfast, N. Ireland
- Genre: Irish folk, Celtic
- Length: 55:06
- Label: Rover Records
- Producer: George Millar for Rover Records

The Irish Rovers chronology
Still Rovin' After All These Years (2007)	Gracehill Fair (2010)	Home In Ireland (2011)

Gracehill Fair is the 2010 album release by The Irish Rovers, Rover Records. The album and title track are named after an annual fair in the County Antrim of Northern Ireland. It was recorded in Canada and Ireland, and mixed in Nanaimo, British Columbia, with cover and liner notes artwork by Celtic artist Hamish Burgess. The album includes new original rollicking drinking songs for which the band is best known, as well as a selection of original ballads.

The album was nominated Album of the Year, and title track nominated Song of the Year by the 2011 Vancouver Island Music Awards in Canada. The title track won the 2011 VIMA Song of the Year award.

== Track listing ==
1. "Ireland Boys Hurrah" – 2:20
2. "Home to Bantry Bay" (George Millar) – 3:11
3. "The Dublin Pub Crawl" (George Millar) – 4:28
4. "The Boys of Killybegs" (Tommy Makem) – 3:10
5. "Pretty Susan The Pride of Molyclare" – 4:22
6. "Jigs-Trotting to Larne/The Knotted Chord/The Wise Maid" (Arr. Wilcil McDowell) – 4:05
7. "The Lass with the Bonny Brown Hair" – 4:50
8. "The Girls of Derry" (George Millar) – 3:05
9. "Let Him Go Let Him Tarry" – 2:50
10. "I'll Return" (George Millar) – 5:02
11. "Reels-Egan's Favorite/The Dawn" (Arr. Wilcil McDowell) – 4:00
12. "Drink, Sing and be Jolly" (George Millar) – 3:48
13. "Gracehill Fair" (George Millar) – 3:42
14. "And the Sun it Still Rises" (George Millar) – 5:55

== Personnel ==
The Irish Rovers

- George Millar – vocals, guitar, bouzouki
- Wilcil McDowell – accordion
- John Reynolds – vocals, guitar, bass
- Sean O'Driscoll – vocals, banjo, mandolin, bouzouki
- Ian Millar – vocals, guitar, bass
- Fred Graham – vocals, bodhran, drums

Additional musicians

- Patrick Davey – uilleann pipes, flute, whistle
- Morris Crum – keyboards and backup vocals
- Davey Sloan – backup vocals
- Joe Millar – harmonica
- Sheila Gary – fiddle
- Larry Egan – button-key accordion
- Geoffrey Kelly – bodhran
- Billy Antrim – heavy drums and spoons
