= The First of the Irish Rovers =

Live album by The Irish Rovers
- Released: 1966
- Venue: The Ice House, Pasadena, California
- Genre: Irish folk
- Label: Decca

The Irish Rovers chronology
The First of the Irish Rovers (1966)	The Unicorn (1967)

Professional ratings
Review scores
Source	Rating
Allmusic	3/5 stars

The First of the Irish Rovers is the debut live album by the Canadian Irish folk band The Irish Rovers, released in 1966. The album title reflects the last line in the song "The Irish Rover", from which the group took its name.

== Track listing ==
Side One:

1. "The Irish Rover" (Traditional; arranged by Will Millar)
2. "My Boy Willie" (Traditional; arranged by Will Millar)
3. "Rattling Bog" (Traditional; arranged by Will Millar)
4. "Coulter's Candy" (Traditional; arranged by Will Millar)
5. "My Old Man's a Dustman" (Beverley Thorn, Lonnie Donegan, Peter Buchanan)

Side Two:

1. "Patsy Fagan" (Thomas P. Keenan)
2. "I Don't Mind If I Do" (Frank O'Donovan)
3. "Many Young Men of Twenty" (John B. Keane)
4. "Mick Maguire" (James MacCafferty)
5. "Donald Where's Your Trousers" (Traditional)
6. "Nancy Whiskey" (Traditional; arranged by Will Millar)
