= Tales to Warm Your Mind =

Studio album by The Irish Rovers
- Released: 1969
- Genre: Folk
- Label: Decca
- Producer: Milt Okun, Charles "Bud" Dant

The Irish Rovers chronology
The Life of the Rover (1969)	Tales to Warm Your Mind (1969)	On the Shores of Americay (1971)

Tales to Warm Your Mind is a 1969 album by the music group The Irish Rovers. The album title comes from a line in the song "Stop, Look, Listen."

== Track listing ==
Side 1

1. "Stop, Look, Listen" (Stuart Harrison) - 2:09
2. "The Stolen Child" (Arranged and adapted by Will Millar) - 2:25
3. "Penny Whistle Peddler" (George Millar, Will Millar) - 2:25
4. "The Village of Brambleshire Wood" (George Millar, Will Millar) - 2:50
5. "Oh You Mucky Kid" (Stan Kelly) - 2:38
6. "Lily the Pink" (John Gorman, Mike McGear, Roger McGough) - 3:21

Side 2

1. "Mrs. Crandall's Boardinghouse" (George Millar, Will Millar, Wilcil McDowell) - 2:43
2. "Our Little Boy Blue" (based on "Little Boy Blue" by Eugene Field; words: Will Millar) - 3:10
3. "The Minstrel of Cranberry Lane" (Judy Callahan, Mike Callahan) - 2:17
4. "Ally-Bally" (Arranged and adapted by Will Millar) - 2:28
5. "Pigs Can't Fly" (Will Millar) - 1:53
