= Songs of Christmas =

Studio album by The Irish Rovers
- Released: 1999
- Genre: Irish folk music Christmas music
- Length: 44:55
- Label: Rover Records

The Irish Rovers chronology
Come Fill Up Your Glasses (1998)	Songs of Christmas (1999)	Down By The Lagan Side (2000)

Songs of Christmas is the twenty-sixth album by Irish folk music group The Irish Rovers.

== Track listing ==
1. "Bells Over Belfast" - 3:24
2. "God Rest Ye Merry, Gentlemen" - 3:03
3. "Christmas Caroling" - 2:47
4. "Away in a Manger" - 3:10
5. "Good King Wenceslas" - 2:20
6. "We Three Kings" - 3:18
7. "The Christmas Traveller" - 3:03
8. "What Child Is This?" - 3:53
9. "Christmas in Killarney" - 2:59
10. "Silent Night" - 3:13
11. "Miss Fogarty's Christmas Cake" - 3:30
12. "All Through the Night" - 3:39
13. "Grandma Got Run Over by a Reindeer" - 3:26
14. "We Wish You a Merry Christmas" - 3:10

== Personnel ==
- George Millar - vocals, guitar, bouzouki
- Wilcil McDowell - accordion
- Joe Millar - vocals, bass, harmonica, melodeon
- John Reynolds - vocals, guitar, bass
