= Lydia Pinkham House =

Historic house in Massachusetts, United States

- U.S. National Register of Historic Places
- U.S. National Historic Landmark
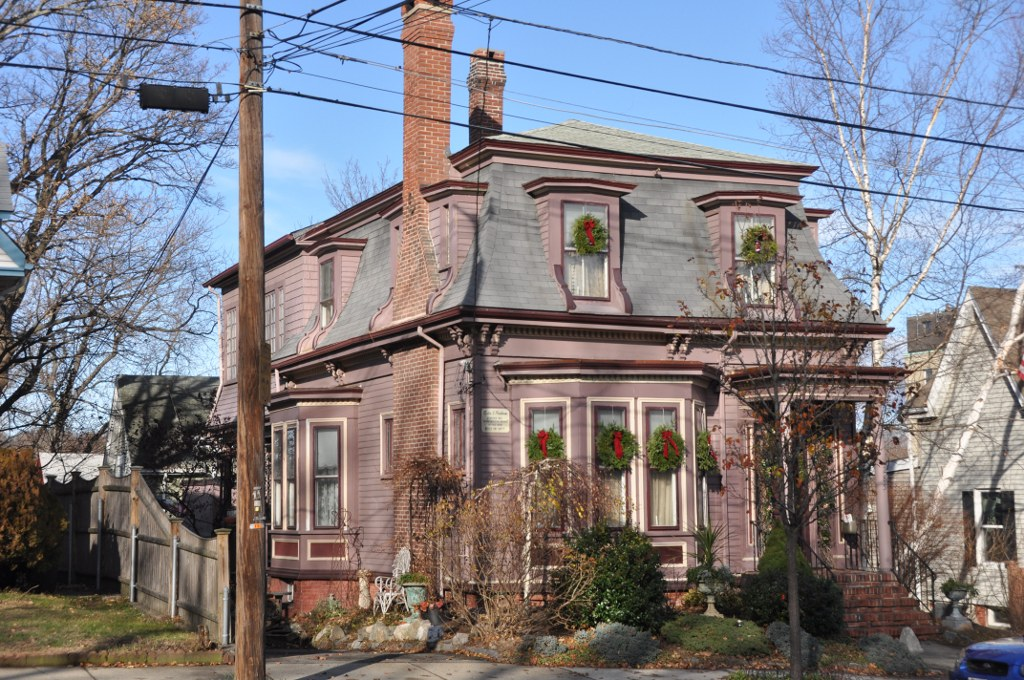
- South profile and east elevation, 2012

- Location within Massachusetts Location within the United States
- Location: Lynn, Massachusetts
- Coordinates: 42°28′33″N 70°57′3″W
- Built: circa 1872
- Architectural style: Second Empire Cottage
- NRHP reference No.: 12000818

Significant dates
- Added to NRHP: September 25, 2012
- Designated NHL: August 25, 2014

The Lydia Pinkham House was the Lynn, Massachusetts, home of Lydia Pinkham, a leading manufacturer and marketer of patent medicines in the late 19th century. It is in this house that she developed Lydia Pinkham's Vegetable Compound, an application claimed to provide relief for "female complaints". Its address, 285 Western Avenue, was widely known, for women all over the country would write to her for advice and comment, and the company cultivated the idea that Pinkham created the compound in her home. Pinkham herself would answer such letters, and the practice was continued by the company in her name for some time after her death in 1883.

== House history ==
The house was built in circa 1872 by either Charles Beede, the seller of the property in 1871, or Leander Berry, who purchased it. The house was built with Second Empire styling, including a Mansard roof, which was then in fashion. In 1876 Beede reacquired the property, which he then rented to Isaac and Lydia Pinkham. It was at the time the only Second Empire home in the neighborhood. The Pinkhams occupied the house until Lydia's death, during which time the company rose to national prominence. The basement of the main block has large storage areas and shows evidence that it once contained a large stove on which the Pinkham compound would have been produced.

The original house had an ell that extended from the rear. In the years 1922 to 1928 a sleeping porch and several rooms were added to the second floor. Two fireplaces were added, from the outside. Around 2000 the building was given a major rehabilitation.

The house was listed on the National Register of Historic Places in 2012. Two years later it was further designated a National Historic Landmark.

== See also ==
- List of National Historic Landmarks in Massachusetts
- National Register of Historic Places listings in Lynn, Massachusetts
- National Register of Historic Places listings in Essex County, Massachusetts
