= Sandra Beech =

Irish-Canadian children's musician

Sandra Beech (born Sandra Millar c. 1942 in Ballymena, Northern Ireland) is an Irish-Canadian children's musician. She was a member of the family music group The Musical Millars after relocating to Canada in 1953. After her 1964 marriage to Len Beech, she specialised in recording children's music.

Her brothers Will and George Millar, plus her cousin Joe Millar, were members of The Irish Rovers.

Sandra Beech has three daughters with her husband Len Beech: Carrie Beech, Heather Beech and Jennifer Beech. Sandra Beech also has nine granddaughters.

== Awards and recognition ==
- 1980: Nominee, Juno Award for Best Children's Album, Chickery Chick
- 1982: WINNER, Juno Award for Best Children's Album, Inch By Inch
- 1991: Nominee, Juno Award for Best Children's Album, Yes I Can
- 1999: Nominee, Juno Award for Best Children's Album, Celebrate the Music

== Discography ==
- 1979: Chickery Chick
- 1982: Inch By Inch (Attic)
- 1982: Sunshine Songs (Attic)
- 1984: Songs About Animals and Others (Golden)
- 1984: Sidewalk Shuffle (Kids Records)
- 1989: Yes I Can (A&M)
- 1994: The Celtic Collection (Western Publishing/Golden)
- 1995: Sandra Beech sings safety songs (OBPPI)
- 1998: Celebrate the Music (Page Music) ISBN 0-9681090-6-3
- 2003: The Pretend Box Songs (compilation, Page Music/EMI)
