= The Wild Rover =

Folk song

- Song
- Catalogue: Roud 1173
- Genre: Folk
- Written: c. 1600s

"The Wild Rover" (Roud 1173) is a popular and well-travelled folk song. Many territories have laid claim to having the original version.

== History ==
In the English Folk Song and Dance periodical "Folk Music Journal" vol 10 (2015), Brian Peters claimed that the origin of the song was a seventeenth century English Broadside written by Thomas Lanfiere. This evolved into several distinct versions found in England, Scotland, Ireland and North America. Shortly afterwards it became popular in Australia.

The song tells the story of a young man who has been away from his hometown for many years. When he returns to his former alehouse, the landlady refuses him credit, until he presents the gold which he has gained while he has been away. He sings of how his days of roving are over and how he intends to return to his home and settle down.

== Other overview or significant versions ==
According to Professor T. M. Devine in his book The Scottish Nation 1700–2000 (Penguin, 2001), it was written as a temperance song. It is found in the book, The American Songster, printed in the US by W. A. Leary in 1845, and spread from Scotland to America from the temperance movement. There is another US printed version in the "Forget-Me-Not Songster" (c. 1850), published by Locke. An alternative history is suggested by a collection of ballads, dated between 1813 and 1838, held in the Bodleian Library. The printer, Catnach, was based in the Seven Dials area of London. The Bodleian bundle contains "The Wild Rover". The Greig-Duncan collection (compiled by Gavin Greig, 1848–1917) contains six versions of the song.

The song is number 1173 in the Roud Folk Song Index, which lists 200 versions, many of which are broadsides, in chapbooks or song collections. About 50 have been collected from traditional singers. Of these, 26 were collected in England, 12 in Scotland, 3 in Ireland, 5 in Australia, 4 in Canada and 2 in the US.

== Influence ==
Raymond Daly and Derek Warfield of The Wolfe Tones describe how the fans of Celtic Football Club in Scotland sing The Wild Rover at away matches. The chorus is well known throughout most Irish, Irish-American and British cultures, even among people who have no knowledge of the rest of the song.

As with Celtic Football Club, the chorus is sung by football fans throughout England, usually with the words adapted to suit the team in question. It is most notably sung by fans of the Blackburn and Burnley Football clubs in England.

Many companies have also taken advantage of the tune's popularity and used it to advertise their products. Dairy Crest adapted the tune to advertise their Clover margarine in the UK. This version was sung by Mae McKenna. There have been so many recordings of the song that it would be inappropriate to list them all. One version was a hit single in the UK. The Irish punk band Stiff Little Fingers released an EP which included the song. It reached number 83 in 1989.

== Recordings ==
=== Traditional ===
The following recordings can be heard on the Vaughan Williams Memorial Library website:

- Jack Mounsey of Wreay, Cumberland (1953)
- George "Pop" Maynard of Burstow, Surrey (1956/57)
- Sam Larner of Winterton, Norfolk (1958)

It has also been performed and recorded by The Dubliners in 1964, The Clancy Brothers with Tommy Makem on the 1965 album “Recorded Live in Ireland”, Harry Hibbs as the closing track on his 1968 album More Harry Hibbs at the Caribou, The Irish Rovers on their 1976 album "The Irish Rovers in Australia", The Pogues on their 1984 album “Red Roses for Me”, the 97th Regimental String Band on the album Chantey Irish in 1987, the Dropkick Murphys on their 2001 album “Sing Loud, Sing Proud!”, and Lankum on their 2019 album "The Livelong Day".

The Alexander Brothers did their own version of the song, titled "Teuchter Music", in which they compare Scottish music to country music.

Sheridan Rúitín arranged and recorded their own version on their album Freakshow. (2025)
