= The Life of the Rover =

Studio album by The Irish Rovers
- Released: 1969
- Label: Decca
- Producer: Charles "Bud" Dant

The Irish Rovers chronology
All Hung Up (1968)	The Life of the Rover (1969)	Tales to Warm Your Mind (1969)

The Life of the Rover is a 1969 album by the music group The Irish Rovers.

== Track listing ==
Side One:

1. "Fifi O'Toole"
2. "Pleasant and Delightful"
3. "Orange Nickelodeon"
4. "King of the Fairies"
5. "Molecatcher"
6. "Wynken, Blynken, and Nod"

Side Two:

1. "Sullivan's John"
2. "Bunclody Cuckoo"
3. "Sam Hall"
4. "Banks of Newfoundland"
5. "Life of the Rover"
