= George Millar (singer) =

Northern Irish musician (born 1947)

- Born: 14 April 1947 (age 79); Ballymena, Northern Ireland
- Genres: Irish folk
- Occupations: Musician, composer, producer
- Instruments: Vocals, guitar
- Years active: Early 1960s-present
- Labels: Rover; DPTV Media; Potato; Varèse Sarabande; Attic; Brunswick; MCA; Festival; Coral; CBS; Universal; Epic; Decca
- Member of: The Irish Rovers
- Website: theirishroversmusic.com

George Millar (born 14 April 1947) is a Northern Irish singer-songwriter, guitarist and co-founder and leader of the Irish folk group The Irish Rovers, which formed in Toronto, Ontario, Canada in 1963 and named after the traditional song "The Irish Rover". He was an original member of the group alongside his brother Joe Millar and friends Jimmy Ferguson, Vic Marcus, and Doug Henderson. They are best known for their international television series, contributing to the popularization of Irish Music in North America, and for the songs "The Unicorn", "Drunken Sailor", "Wasn't That a Party", "The Orange and the Green", "Whiskey on a Sunday", "Lily the Pink", "Finnegan's Wake" and "The Black Velvet Band".

George became a Canadian citizen after Canada's Prime Minister, Pierre Elliott Trudeau, asked The Irish Rovers to do so, in order to officially represent Canada around the world. Millar and The Irish Rovers represented Canada at five World Expos, and in 2018 were honoured as one of Ireland's greatest exports at Dublin, Ireland's EPIC The Irish Emigration Museum.

== Biography ==
Millar is the brother of Will Millar and Sandra Beech. As children, Will and Sandra performed as "The Millar Kids" (George sometimes joined them on spoons) in Ireland before the family emigrated to Canada. While in his teens, he met Jimmy Ferguson at an Irish function in Toronto in 1963. They began playing as The Irish Rovers and were soon joined by George's cousin Joe Millar who also emigrated to Canada. After touring around Ontario playing in cafes, clubs and hotels, George, Jim and Joe left Toronto for Calgary where they joined brother Will Millar who was performing on Just 4 Fun, a children's TV show. With the addition of Will, The Irish Rovers became four and played at The Depression Coffee House in Calgary. Later, they headed to California and were joined by Wilcil McDowell.

Millar sings lead vocal on most of their recordings, including the original 1967 recording of "The Black Velvet Band". He is also lead on "Lord of the Dance", "No More Bread and Butter", "The Lass With The Bonny Brown Hair", "Home To Bantry Bay", and the ballad which we wrote after the death of his wife Betsy, "And The Sun It Still Rises".

Millar has performed on television throughout the 1970s and 1980s on three international Irish Rovers television series and more recently on three additional Irish Rovers television specials in the last few decade.

In 2012, George's song, "The Titanic", was released from the Rovers Drunken Sailor album, focusing attention on Belfast and the Harland and Wolff shipyard that had built the Titanic a century before. After the song, and accompanying video made headlines in Belfast, Northern Ireland, George and the song were featured in a Canadian documentary for the CBC which aided in returning the credit of building the ship to the Northern Ireland shipyards of Belfast. The album was produced in response to YouTube activity.

As of 2025, Millar is still touring with the Irish Rovers as its sole constant member and bandleader.

== Compositions ==
Millar's dozens of compositions include "No More Bread and Butter" which appeared in the film, Dudley Do-Right, the title track from their album/cd, "Gracehill Fair", as well as "Bells Over Belfast", "The Girls of Derry", "The Boys of Belfast", "Rambling Boys of Pleasure", "And The Sun It Still Rises". His more recent songs include "The Titanic", "The Dublin Pub Crawl", "Whores and Hounds" and the Canadian Folk Music Award nominated, "Hey Boys Sing Us A Song".

George has written several children's songs for The Irish Rovers album Songs for the Wee Folk, as well as "The Rovers Farewell" and "Her Wonderful Ass" on the Rovers' Greatest Hits album, The Irish Rovers, 50 Years.

COVID-19 cut short the 2020 release of "Saints And Sinners" album which George wrote and featured "The Banshee's Cry" and "Band Without A Country", both released with videos.

During those COVID years, Millar wrote a new album, "No End In Sight" for the Rovers, which included the song, "Hey Boys Sing Us A Song". The song was written in response to life away from performing and being forced to listen to the news reports of the day. It became an anthem during their 2023 tour and was nominated "Single of the Year" in the 2023 Canadian Folk Music Awards.

== Music producer ==
Millar has produced all of The Irish Rovers albums since 1993 for Rover Records. He has also produced albums for his brother and sister.

== Awards and recognition ==
- 1982: winner, Producer, Juno Award for Best Children's Album, Inch By Inch
- 2011: winner, Producer/Songwriter, Vancouver Island Music Awards, SOCAN - Song of the Year, Gracehill Fair

== Honours - As Member of The Irish Rovers ==
- 1968 Winners, RPM Awards (predecessor of the JUNO Award), "Folk Group of the Year"
- 1968 GRAMMY Awards Nomination, "Folk Performance of the Year”
- 1971 Winners ACTRA Award, Best Variety Performance
- 1975 JUNO Award Nomination, Best Album Cover, "Emigrate! Emigrate!”
- 1979 Winners, PROCAN Harold Moon Award for International Achievement for TV Program
- 1981 JUNO Award Nomination, Single of the Year, "Wasn’t That A Party”
- 1981 JUNO Award Nomination, Folk Artist of the Year
- 1982 JUNO Award Nomination, Group of the Year
- 1982 JUNO Award Nomination, Country Group of the Year
- 1982 JUNO Award Nomination, Folk Artist of the Year
- 1983 JUNO Award Nomination, Country Group of the Year
- 2010 Winners, VIMA Award (Vancouver Island Music Awards), SOCAN Song of the Year, "Gracehill Fair"
- 2023 Canadian Folk Music Awards Nomination, Single of the Year, "Hey Boys Sing Us A Song”
