= Children of the Unicorn =

Studio album by The Irish Rovers
- Released: 1976
- Genre: Irish folk music, Children's music
- Label: K-Tel

The Irish Rovers chronology
Greatest Hits (1974)	Children of the Unicorn (1976)	The Irish Rovers in Australia (1976)

Children of the Unicorn is the 12th album by Irish folk music group The Irish Rovers. It is an album of songs for children, and features a re-recording of their 1968 hit, "The Unicorn".

== Track listing ==
Side 1

1. "Puff, the Magic Dragon"
2. "Snoopy vs. the Red Baron"
3. "The Lollipop Tree"
4. "The Music Man"
5. "Katrina"
6. "Jack and the Beanstalk"
7. "Kid's Medley/Two"
8. "Golden Slumber"
9. "The Sandman"
10. "Morning Town Ride"

Side 2

1. "Bun Worrier, Twerp and Me"
2. "The Little Match Girl"
3. "The Fox Went Out on a Chilly Night"
4. "Kid's Medley/One"
5. "Two Little Boys"
6. "Si Mon Moine Voulait Danser"
7. "The Littlest Leprachaun"
8. "Drover's Dream"
9. "The Unicorn"
10. "Purple People Eater"
