= All Hung Up =

Studio album by The Irish Rovers
- Released: 1968
- Label: Decca
- Producer: Charles "Bud" Dant

The Irish Rovers chronology
The Unicorn (1967)	All Hung Up (1968)	The Life of the Rover (1969)

All Hung Up is a 1968 album by the music group The Irish Rovers.

== Reception ==
The Allmusic review by Bruce Eder awarded the album 3.5 stars, stating "Although it doesn't have anything as universally popular as 'The Unicorn' to pull people in, the Irish Rovers' third album is a most genial and accessible record, filled with low-key playing and singing, alternating with bursts of exuberance in the singing and playing. Indeed, '(The Puppet Song) Whiskey on a Sunday' almost comes off as a Gaelic equivalent to sunshine pop, whereas 'Shamrock Shore' is a bit more traditional in its sensibilities but no less catchy and rousing. Will Millar, George Millar, and Jim Ferguson get featured vocals across the dozen songs, which range from Leadbelly's 'Goodnight Irene' to Brendan Behan's 'Liverpool Lou,' with a detour into the ridiculous ('Does Your Chewing Gum Lose Its Flavor on the Bedpost Overnight'). Wilcil McDowell gets the last word with a featured accordion solo on 'Rovers Fancy.'"

Professional ratings
Review scores
Source	Rating
Allmusic	3.5/5 stars

"Whiskey on a Sunday" reached #34 in Canada, and "Biplane Evermore" reached #50.

== Track listing ==
=== Side One ===
1. "Whiskey on a Sunday" (The Puppet Song)
2. "Cold Winter Shadows"
3. "Shamrock Shore"
4. "My Little Maureen"
5. "Bare Legged Joe"
6. "Goodnight, Irene"

=== Side Two ===
1. "Biplane Evermore"
2. "Does Your Chewing Gum Lose Its Flavor (On The Bedpost Over Night)"
3. "Liverpool Lou"
4. "Up Among the Heather"
5. "Henry Joe McCracken"
6. "Rovers Fancy"

== Personnel ==
- George Millar
- Jimmy Ferguson
- Will Millar
- Wicil McDowell
- Arranged and Adapted by The Irish Rovers
- Produced by Charles Bud Dant
