= Coulter's Candy =

Scots folk song

"Coulter's Candy", also known as "Ally Bally" or "Ally Bally Bee, is a Scots folk song.

== Origin ==
This song dates to the mid to late-19th century by a former Galashiels weaver, Robert Coltart. Coltart made aniseed-flavoured sweets in Melrose and sold them around the markets of the Border towns. While the song refers to the type of confectionery used, the recipe was lost after Coltart's death (c. 1880). He died of a brain tumour, penniless, and was buried in an unmarked ("pauper's") grave in Eastlands Cemetery, in Galashiels.

In 2019, the Scottish Borders Council erected a statue in honour of Coulter's Candy in Galashiels, as part of a town centre regeneration project. Created by Angela Hunter, the statue became part of a new town trail. On 2 April 2024, a headstone was unveiled on the 144th anniversary of Coltart’s death; the headstone was a fundraising effort.

== Lyrics ==
Ally bally, ally bally bee,
Sittin' on yer mammy's knee,
Greetin' for a wee bawbee,
Tae buy some Coulter's candy.

Poor wee Jeanie's gettin' awfy thin,
A rickle o' banes covered ower wi' skin,
Noo she's gettin' a wee double chin,
Wi' sookin' Coulter's Candy.

Mammy gie's ma thrifty doon,
Here's auld Coulter comin' roon',
Wi' a basket on his croon,
Selling Coulter's Candy.

When you grow old, a man to be,
you'll work hard and you'll sail the seas,
an' bring hame pennies for your faither and me,
Tae buy mair Coulter's Candy.

Coulter he's a affa funny man,
He maks his candy in a pan,
Awa an greet to yer ma,
Tae buy some Coulter's candy.

Little Annie's greetin' tae,
Sae whit can puir wee Mammy dae,
But gie them a penny atween them twae,
Tae buy mair Coulter's Candy.

The following verse is also sung, at least in Peterhead, Aberdeenshire since before the 1920s:

Coulter's Candy, a penny a lump,
'At's i' stuff tae mak ye jump.
If ye jump you're sure tae fa',
Coulter's Candy, a penny fur a'

== Modern recordings ==
Coulter's Candy was recorded by several notable artists during the late American folk music revival, which was concurrent to the second British folk revival.

Robin Hall and Jimmie Macgregor with The Galliards sang it on their 1961 Scottish Choice album, Decca, ACL 1065. In 1962, Norman Buchan published Coulter's Candy in 101 Scottish Songs, stating: "This song probably produced more correspondence than any other when I printed it in The Weekly Scotsman a few years ago. Robert Coultart – the 'Coulter' of the song – made and sold his own candy round all the country fairs and markets in the Borders... etc. I first heard it from Scots actor, playwright and folk singer Roddy McMillan." It was later collected in a children's playground in 1964 by James T. R. Ritchie, who published it in a book called The Singing Street. A Danish version titled "Storkespringvandet" was released 1965 by the folksinger "Cæsar" (aka Bjarne Bøgesø Rasmussen). Lyrics by Thøger Olesen. Canadian singer Catherine McKinnon also recorded a version of the song on her album Voice of an Angel (1965). The Irish Rovers included the song on their album The First of the Irish Rovers (1966). A version of the song was released by The Kerries in 1967 on Major Minor Records 45 MM541, the song was produced by Tommy Scott. It was recorded by Donovan on HMS Donovan (1971).

== Parody ==
Hamish Imlach recorded a parody version, in which a buyer complains about the poor quality of the candy. The song was also parodied on BBC Radio Scotland by the comedy group Flying Pig Productions in their show Desperate Fishwives, who related the song to the stereotypically poor Scottish diet.
