= The Black Velvet Band =

Traditional British/Irish folk song

"The Black Velvet Band"
Performed by Celtic Aire of the United States Air Force Band

"The Black Velvet Band" (Roud number 2146) is a traditional folk song collected from singers in Ireland describing how a young man is tricked and then sentenced to transportation to Australia, a common punishment in the British Empire during the 19th century. Versions were also published on broadsides.

In Europe, The Dubliners released a popular version of the song in 1967 based on a version sung by the traditional English singer Harry Cox. In the US, also in 1967 The Irish Rovers released Black Velvet Band sung by the band's co-founder George Millar. The Rovers single was a multi-million seller at the time and in 2013 reached the Billboard top 20 World Digital Sales charts.

== Synopsis ==
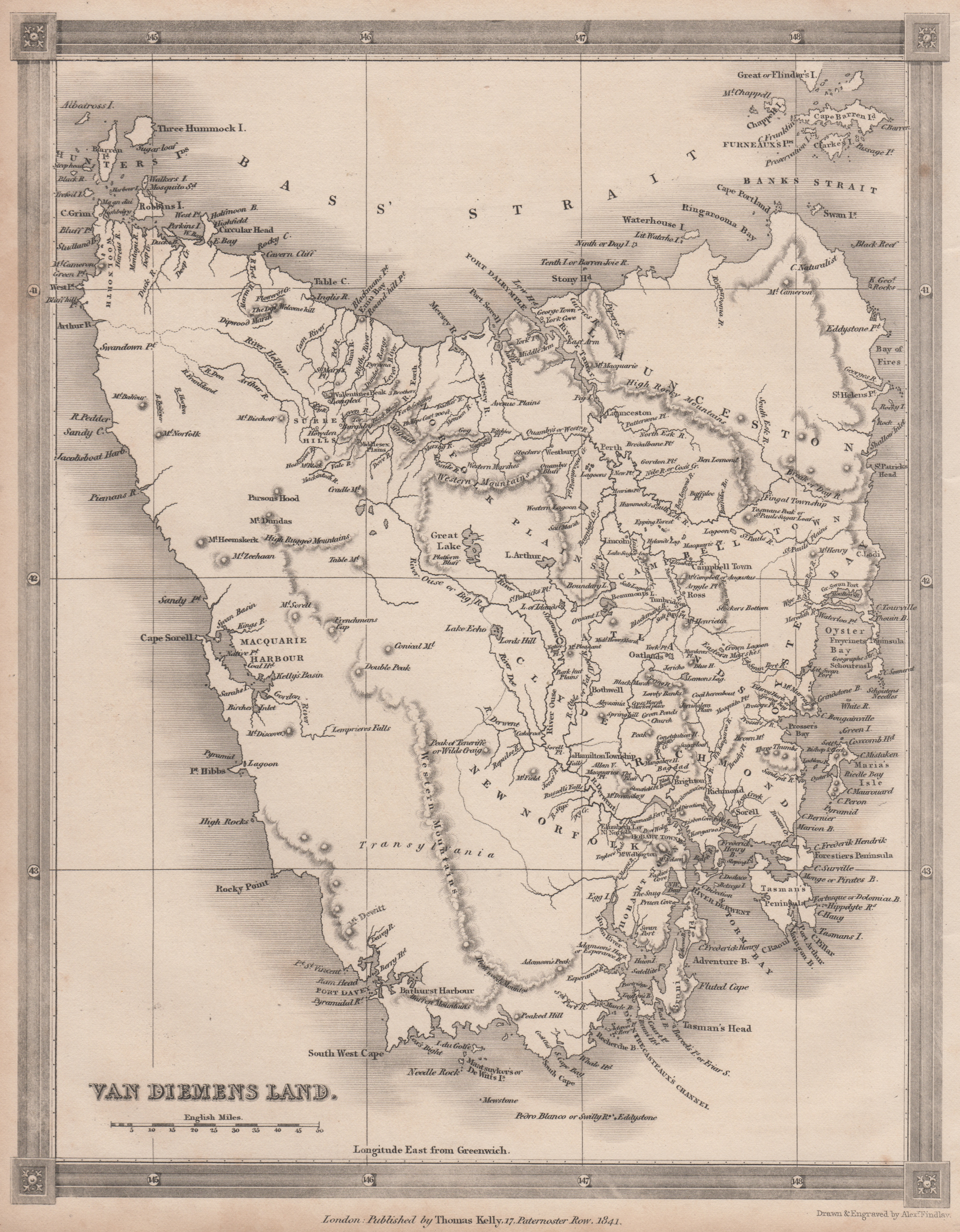
Old map of Van Diemen's Land (Tasmania)

The narrator is a bound apprentice in a town (which varies across different versions). He becomes romantically involved with a young woman, who steals a watch and places it in his pocket or hand. The apprentice does not attempt to stop her, which is often interpreted as a reflection of his love for her. However, the man does wish misfortune upon the woman, as seen in the line "Bad luck to the black velvet band". The apprentice appears in court the following day and is sentenced to seven years of penal servitude in Van Diemen's Land (Tasmania), which at the time served as a prison colony. In the broadside versions, the young woman's motivation is more explicit - she has met a sailor and wishes to rid herself of her lover.

In the broadsides, the action takes place in Ratcliffe Highway, a street in the East End of London, but in collected versions various locations are mentioned - London; Belfast; Tralee; a town in Bedfordshire; and Dunmanway, County Cork.

== Versions ==
The Roud Index has 98 entries for this song, comprising broadside ballads, versions collected from traditional singers, and field recordings.

It was published as a broadside ballad by Swindells of Manchester some time between 1796 and 1853, and by H. Such of London sometime between 1863 and 1885.

Versions of the song have been collected from Dorset, Co. Durham, Hampshire, London, Norfolk, Suffolk, Sussex, Isles of Scilly, and Worcestershire in England, from Belfast, County Antrim, and County Cork in Ireland, from Western Australia, Queensland, and New South Wales in Australia and from Ontario, Canada, and Maine, USA. The earliest collected version listed was collected by George Gardiner from Alfred Goodyear of Axford, Hampshire, England in July 1907. Both Alfred Goodyear's version and one collected by Clive Carey from Mrs Terry of Chithurst, Sussex, in 1911 (and set in Belfast) contain the "Her eyes they shone like diamonds" chorus also collected from Harry Cox.

While working for the BBC, Peter Kennedy recorded a version in Belfast in 1952. In 1959, a version was found in Australia. An earlier version by the publisher Swindells in Manchester is very wordy, and has no chorus. It places the events in Barking, Essex. Some of the earliest versions mention the Old Bailey and London Town. The publication date of that version is probably between 1837 and 1853.

An American song called "The Girl In The Blue Velvet Band", credited to Cliff Carlisle and Mel Forre, was recorded by Bill Monroe, Doc Watson and Mac Wiseman among others. It has a similar plot and may be loosely based on "Black Velvet Band".

Following the Ireland rugby team's Grand Slam win in 2009, winger Tommy Bowe sang his own version of 'Black Velvet Band' to a triumphant crowd on the team's homecoming on Dawson Street, Dublin.

== Popular culture ==
The song was used at least twice in the BBC's television series, Peaky Blinders. It can be heard in Seasons 1 and 6.

== The Dubliners ==
"Black Velvet Band"
- Side A of the UK single

Single by The Dubliners

from the album A Drop of the Hard Stuff
- B-side: "Maloney Wants a Drink"
- Released: 30 August 1967
- Genre: Folk, Irish, pop
- Length: 3:45
- Label: Major Minor
- Songwriter: Traditional
- Producer: Tommy Scott

The Dubliners singles chronology
"Seven Drunken Nights" (1967)	"Black Velvet Band" (1967)	"All For Me Grog" (1967)

The Dubliners version, possibly the best known, is slightly adapted from a version recorded by Ewan MacColl from the Norfolk singer Harry Cox in 1955, and recorded by MacColl and Peggy Seeger on their 1960 LP Chorus from the Gallows.

Chart (1967)	Peak position
Ireland (IRMA)	4
UK Singles (Official Charts)	15

== Recordings ==
- Ewan MacColl and Peggy Seeger on their Topic LP, Chorus from the Gallows (TSDL502, 1960)
- The Wolfe Tones on their album Up The Rebels in 1966. The song appears as "The Black Ribbon Band"
- The Irish Rovers on their album The Unicorn in 1967. Single was released 1967 on the B side of The Unicorn.
- The Dubliners version reached number 15 on the UK Singles Chart, number 4 in the Irish Singles Chart and number 28 in the European chart in 1967.
- Carlton Showband on their Canadian RCA LP, A Night at the Pub (1967).
- Harry Hibbs on his Canadian debut LP At the Caribou Club (1968).
- Dropkick Murphys on their album Blackout (2003). Like many of Dropkick Murphys' recordings of Irish ballads, this version changes the setting to the band's home state of Massachusetts, in this case the city of Brockton.
- Four to the Bar on their live album Craic on the Road (1994), in a medley with "The Galway Shawl" and "The Wild Rover".
- Bill Monroe (as "Girl In The Blue Velvet Band")
- Brobdingnagian Bards on their album The Holy Grail of Irish Drinking Songs (2006).
- Bakerloo on the compilation Here's To The Irish, Vol. 2.
- The High Kings on their album The High Kings (2008).
- Seamus Kennedy on his album By Popular Demand.
- Ronnie Drew, former lead singer of The Dubliners, on his solo album The Humour Is on Me Now (1999).
- Harry Cox on compilation album The Bonny Labouring Boy.
- Celtic Thunder did a cover for their summer holiday shows in Atlantic City.
- Johnny Kelly and The Capitol Showband recorded a version of the song, which reached No. 1 on the Irish Singles Chart in August 1967.
- The Wiggles did an adapted version of the story on their Sing a Song of Wiggles DVD starring Sam as Prince Michael and Dorothy the Dinosaur's voice-over, Carolyn Ferrie. Captain Feathersword played by Paul Paddick also did the narrations of the story.
- Johnny Logan covered the song on his album, The Irish Connection (2007).
- Marc Gunn recorded it on his albums Irish Drinking Songs and a bluesy version on The Bridge and again with Jamie Haeuser on their album How America Saved Irish Music (2014).
- Damien Leith recovered a version for his album Songs From Ireland released in Australia in 2015. It peaked at No.11 on the ARIA Charts.
- Lionel Long recorded it on his 1962 album "The Wild Colonial Boy"
- Sheridan Rúitín recorded it live for their album Live at Rick's Club American (2024)
