= Will Millar =

Northern Irish-Canadian singer (born 1940)

- Born: January 8, 1940 (age 86); Ballymena, County Antrim, Northern Ireland
- Genre: Irish folk
- Instruments: Vocals; Guitar; Mandolin; Banjo; Tin Whistle
- Years active: 1960s-2000s
- Website: willmillar.ca

Will Millar (born January 8, 1940) is a Northern Irish-Canadian singer best known as a co-founding member of The Irish Rovers. Until his departure in 1995, he was the group's front man. He plays guitar, banjo, mandolin and tin whistle.

== Early life and career ==
Born in Ballymena, County Antrim, Northern Ireland. Millar and his youngest sister Sandra Beech performed as The Millar Kids before the family emigrated to Canada in 1953 when Millar was 14. Millar formed a Calypso Band, Kalypso Kews, that performed for two years in Toronto's Yonge Street at the Calypso Club. Millar moved to Calgary, Alberta and hosted a children's television show as well as forming an Irish folk trio.

In the 1960s, Millar invited his brother, then 15, George, his cousin Joe and Jimmy Ferguson to stay with him in Calgary. He brought them on his television show and started performing with them at Calgary's first folk club, The Depression.

== Irish Rovers ==
Under the guidance of Les Weinstein, Millar's manager, he took the new group to San Francisco and after an audition they made the Purple Onion in San Francisco and the Ice House in Pasadena their home base club. In 1968, under the production of Bud Dant of Decca Records, the group's recording of the Shel Silverstein song "The Unicorn" went to #1 in Canada and #3 on the Billboard pop chart in the U.S. and became the Irish Rovers' signature song.

Between 1970 and 1973, Millar travelled back and forth between Ireland and Canada to manage an Irish Georgian manor and to host a TV show. Their CBC-TV show included guests such as Johnny Cash, the Carter Family, Waylon Jennings, Pat Boone and Roger Miller.

In 1980, he and his wife Catherine lived in Charlottetown, Prince Edward Island before moving to Vancouver, British Columbia in 1982.

In 1995, Millar, after 30 years of leading the Irish Rovers grew restless to pursue other creative interests. He formed a new band called Some Mad Irishmen and released two CDs and toured extensively with his creation of the stage production of "Ireland..where the song and dance began". He built a recording studio with his friend John Ellis and recorded a children's CD on the Attic label. He also appeared semi-regularly on The Red Green Show as Jimmy McVeigh, a postman who was trying to repair a boat. At this time he devoted a good part of his time to develop his first love of Art.

Since his departure from the Irish Rovers, Millar has produced six solo albums. Four Celtic instrumental CDs were released by Chacra Music, The Lark in the Clear Aire, Celtic Seasons, Celtic Reverie and Journey of the Celt. Two of these albums went Gold in Canada.

Millar has published two books, Children of the Unicorn (published by McClelland and Stewart) and Messing About in Boats (published by Whitecap Publishers). The latter made it to the top ten in The Globe and Mail's non-fiction list.

Millar's art is exhibited in galleries across Canada and Ireland, and he holds annual gallery shows.

In 2013, Millar and his wife Catherine lived next to Quamichan Lake in the municipality of North Cowichan on Vancouver Island.
