= The Kerry Recruit =

"The Kerry Recruit" (Roud 520; also known as "The Irish Recruit", and sometimes appearing with the subtitle "The Lawyer Outwitted") is a humorous Irish song about an Irish soldier from Kerry who enlisted into the Crimean War, with references made to various locations and battles of the Crimean War, such as Balaclava, the Alma, and Inkerman. The song originally derives from previously published broadside ballads, many of which were printed before the Crimean War and were instead about other battles or wars, such as the Battle of Trafalgar or the Irish Rebellion of 1798.

== Lyrics ==
The content of the song focuses on the titular (unnamed) Kerry recruit, a peasant beginning the song by "digging turf in Tralee" (or "digging turf on the lea"), who abandons his tool out of desire to do more with his life. Later, encountering a recruiting sergeant, the protagonist of the song is enlisted into the army. The humorous aspects of the song come from the inexperience of the recruit, such as giving descriptions of a man-of-war as "Three sticks in the middle, and on 'em a sheet, // And she walks on the water without any feet" or from the recruit misunderstanding or misidentifying the equipment (a red coat, stock, cockade, gun, and horse) given to him. This inability of the protagonist to accomplish anything also allowed the song to be used as an anti-war song, discouraging recruitment and enlistment by mocking the rigidity of the military and other aspects of military training. A difference in tone at the end of the song, where the recruit describes their experience in Balaclava and lists losing an eye and leg, as well as "heads, arms, and legs lying scattered around," also indicates that the intent of the song was not wholly intended to mock the recruit. Some versions of the song include details or lines about the way the Kerry recruit joined the army, such as being bribed by the recruiting sergeant or conned into enlisting after being drunk. Others include references to the recruit returning from war only to be exiled from their community.

The lyrics themselves are written primarily in English, but includes some fragments and phrases of Irish, arising from the use of street ballads to stir public sentiment and nationalism, where the use of the Irish language would be effective or as a holdover from the song's relative lack of popularity before being published in Irish. The contrast between the use of "rural" language or Irish slang and the higher-class English of the army would also be a part of the mockery (either of the rural Irish peasantry or the army).

The phrase "Kerry recruit" became a pejorative phrase meaning a woefully inexperienced or incapable person.

== See also ==
- Johnny, I Hardly Knew Ye
