= The Rovers (album) =

Studio album by The Irish Rovers
- Released: 1980
- Genre: Country
- Label: Attic
- Producer: Jack Richardson

The Irish Rovers chronology
| Tall Ships and Salty Dogs (1979) | The Rovers (1980) | Wasn't That a Party (1980) |

The Rovers is a 1980 album by the music group The Irish Rovers. It was their first album after they rebranded themselves as The Rovers, dropping "Irish" from the group name.

Their lively comeback single, "Wasn't That a Party", peaked as high as #37 as of May 16, 1981 in Billboard, #40 in Record World, and #37 in Cash Box.

== Track listing ==
Side 1

1. "Mexican Girl"
2. "Yo Yo Man"
3. "Tara"
4. "Matchstalk Men and Matchstalk Cats and Dogs"
5. "Pheasant Plucker's Son"

Side 2

1. "Wasn't That a Party"
2. "Fireflyte"
3. "Movie Cowboys"
4. "Victory Chimes"
5. "Here's to the Horses"

== U.S. release ==
The album was released in the United States as "Wasn't That a Party." It had the same songs as "The Rovers," but a different cover.

== Chart performance ==
| Chart (1980) | Peak position |
|---|---|
| Canadian RPM Country Albums | 1 |
| Canadian RPM Top Albums | 26 |
