= Jimmy Ferguson =

20th-century Irish musician

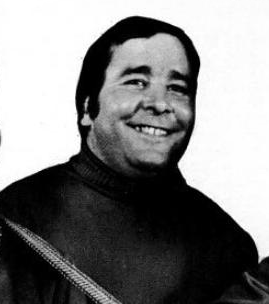
- Jimmy in 1968

Background information
- Born: James Francis Ferguson; 26 February 1940; Belfast, Northern Ireland
- Died: 8 October 1997 (aged 57) Worcester, Massachusetts
- Occupation: Singer
- Instruments: Vocals
- Years active: 1963-1997 (The Irish Rovers)

James Francis Ferguson (February 26, 1940 – October 8, 1997) was a founding member of the Irish-Canadian folk group The Irish Rovers. He was the only member who did not play an instrument. He sang in a rich baritone voice, in contrast to Will Millar's tenor, and was also the comedian of the group.

Ferguson was born in Belfast to a Roman Catholic family. He emigrated to Canada as a young man, and met George Millar in 1963 at an Irish function in Toronto. They decided to form a folk duo and soon after were joined by Millar's cousin, Joe Millar plus two Torontonians, Vic Marcus and Doug Henderson while adopting the name The Irish Rovers. In 1979, Jimmy told Canadian Music Magazine, "We actually formed the group in Toronto. I sang, George played guitar and at that time Joe was playing a little button key accordion. We were ambitious in those days, we'd played the clubs to death in Toronto and we didn't know what to do next; what direction to take. So we (George, Joe and Jim) decided to visit Will in Calgary, ended up staying there, and the Irish Rovers became four." Joe moved his family out from Toronto, and the band continued in Calgary.

Ferguson's voice is heard in several Irish Rovers recordings, including "The Orange and the Green" and the 1981 hit "Wasn't That a Party". The heavy-set Ferguson suffered a heart attack in New Zealand in 1992 and continued to have heart problems for the rest of his life. He died in his sleep in a hotel room, whilst on tour in Worcester, Massachusetts in 1997 at the age of 57.

== Personal life ==
Ferguson married Jan Adams in 1968 and they had a daughter, Erin, in 1970.
