= Harry Hibbs (musician) =

Musical artist (1942–1989)

- Born: Henry Thomas Joseph Hibbs; September 11, 1942; Bell Island, Dominion of Newfoundland
- Died: December 21, 1989 (aged 47) Toronto, Ontario, Canada
- Genre: Folk
- Occupations: Singer, musician
- Instrument: Accordion
- Years active: 1968–1989
- Labels: Arc Records, Caribou Records, Marathon Music, Hibbs Records, TeeVee Records, Tapestry Records, Fantasia Records

Harry Hibbs (September 11, 1942 – December 21, 1989) was a Canadian musician, Newfoundland's best-known icon for traditional Newfoundland music.

He was born Henry Thomas Joseph Hibbs, September 11, 1942, on Bell Island, Dominion of Newfoundland. He was educated at St. Kevin's High School, Wabana, and moved with his family to Toronto shortly after the death of his father. There, Harry worked at various manufacturing facilities such as an auto parts factory, printing plant, and a munitions factory. At one of these plants he suffered a career changing accident that prevented him from any strenuous work; this led Harry to take up performing music. He had learned this skill from his father, who was an accomplished fiddle player and also played accordion. In addition, His mother had taught him to sing Irish ballads.

Hibbs became a member of the Caribou Show Band that played regularly to expatriate Newfoundlanders living in Toronto. Members of the band at that time were Johnny Burke on bass guitar, Norma Gale, vocals, Brian Barron, mandolin and fiddle, Roddy Lee on drums, Bob Lucier on steel guitar and Harry Hibbs on accordion. Hibbs was signed to Arc Records by Phil Anderson, president of Arc Records, and the first album released in October 1968 with signature song "The Black Velvet Band". In 1968 a weekly television show called At the Caribou featuring Hibbs aired on CHCH-TV in Hamilton. Hibbs appeared on many television programs such as The Tommy Hunter Show, Singalong Jubilee and Don Messer's Jubilee.

Hibbs went on to record 26 albums, of which several went gold. He opened his own nightclub, the Conception Bay Club, in Toronto in 1978. Hibbs died in Toronto on December 21, 1989, of cancer. Steve Fruitman of CIUT-FM created the Porcupine Award in 1990 for those who deserve recognition for their work in Canadian folklore music. In 1991 the Harry Hibbs Award was inaugurated and its first recipient was Geoff Meeker. This award was eventually renamed the Harry Hibbs Award for Perseverance. In 1993 Harry Hibbs was inducted into the Porcupine Hall of Fame.

== Discography ==
=== Studio albums ===
- Harry Hibbs at the Caribou Club (1968) Arc
- More Harry Hibbs at the Caribou (1968) Arc
- The Incredible Harry Hibbs (1969) Arc
- Harry Hibbs' Fourth (1970) Arc
- A Fifth of Harry Hibbs (1971) Arc
- Somewhere at Sea (1971) Caribou
- The All New Harry Hibbs With Shrimp Cocktail (1972) Caribou
- All Kinds of Everything (1973) Marathon
- Between Two Trees (1976) Hibbs
- A Musical Tour of Ireland (1982) Fantasia

=== Compilation Albums ===
- The Best of Harry Hibbs (1972) Arc
- The Best of Harry Hibbs (1978) TeeVee
- Pure Gold (1980) Tapestry
- The Harry Hibbs Library Volume 1: Newfoundland Songs (1990) Fantasia
- The Harry Hibbs Library Volume 2: Accordion Favourites (1990) Fantasia
- The Harry Hibbs Library Volume 3: Sentimental Favourites (1990) Fantasia
- The Harry Hibbs Library Volume 4: Harry's Best (1990) Fantasia
- The Very Best of Harry Hibbs Volume 1 (2001) CBC
- The Incredible Harry Hibbs (2014) Condor
- Off the Floor-Songs From the Harry Hibbs Shows (2017) Hibbs/Avondale
