= The Irish Rover =

Irish folk song

"The Irish Rover"
Performed by Celtic Aire of the United States Air Force Band

"The Irish Rover" (Roud 4379) is an Irish folk song about a magnificent though improbable sailing ship that reaches an unfortunate end. It has been recorded by numerous artists, with the lyrics changing over time due to the folk process.

The song describes a gigantic ship with "twenty-three masts" (versions by the Dubliners, the Pogues and the High Kings claim twenty-seven), a colourful crew and varied types of cargo in enormous amounts. The verses grow successively more extravagant about the wonders of the great ship. The seven-year voyage culminates in a disastrous end, after the ship suffers a measles outbreak, killing all but the narrator and the captain's dog. The ship then strikes a rock, turning "nine times around" and sinking. The captain's dog drowns in the incident, and the narrator is the only survivor, "the last of the Irish Rover", leaving no one else alive to contradict the tale.

== History ==
Walton's New Treasury of Irish Songs and Ballads 2 (1966) attributes the song to songwriter/arranger J. M. Crofts.

A manuscript version of the song dated in 1937 and 1938 is currently in the Irish National Folklore Collection in Dublin, attributed to Lisgorman Townland (a place, not a person) of Cloonlogher, County Leitrim. The next source for Roud 4379 in the Vaughan Williams Library catalogue is the singer Denis Murray from County Cork, collected by Fred Hamer, possibly 1946. On the time scale of traditional folk songs this is quite recent.

A Canadian source, Oliver John Abbott (1872–1962), was born in England and worked in farms in an Irish community in the Ottawa Valley. He recorded this song in 1961 but claimed to have learned it during the 1880s and 1890s. Another source in Maine was recorded in 1941. This suggests that the song is connected to an Irish expatriate community in Canada or the United States.

== Charts ==
(The Pogues & The Dubliners single)

Chart (1987)	Peak position
Ireland (IRMA)	1
UK Singles (Official Charts)	8
New Zealand (Recorded Music NZ)	25

== Cultural impact ==
- "The Irish Rover" is a popular Irish-Gaelic Scottish country dance and is set to the music of the song.

== Recordings ==
"The Irish Rover" has been recorded many times including:

- 1966 – The Irish Rovers on their debut album, The First of the Irish Rovers. They recorded it again in 1996 for the album, The Irish Rovers' Gems., and a number of later albums.
- 1987 – The Dubliners with The Pogues on The Dubliners's album 25 Years Celebration. When released as a single in the same year this version reached number 8 in the UK Singles Chart and number 1 in the Irish Singles Chart.
- 2006 – Bounding Main on their 2006 album Lost at Sea.
- 2011 – Dropkick Murphys on their 2011 album Going Out in Style.
- 2022 – Sheridan Rúitín on their debut album Rebels in the Night.
