= The Orange and the Green =

Irish folk song

Song
- Language: English
- Genre: Irish folk
- Songwriter: Anthony Murphy

"The Orange and the Green" or "The Biggest Mix-Up" is a humorous Irish folk song about a man whose father was a Protestant ("Orange") and whose mother was a Catholic ("Green"). It describes the man's trials as the product of religious intermarriage and how "mixed up" he became as a result of such an upbringing.

This song was written by Anthony Murphy of Liverpool. It has been recorded by bands such as The Irish Rovers, The Wolfe Tones, Paddy Reilly, the Brobdingnagian Bards, Marc Gunn, Harry Hibbs and The Spinners and among others. It is sung to the same tune as "The Wearing of the Green", which is also used in "The Rising of the Moon", another Irish ballad, and "The Army of the Free”, an American song.

== History ==
Liverpool, home to a great many Irish immigrants, has a large number of Catholics. On the other hand, the Protestant Orange Order is also very strong. The Orange Lodge marches every year in July, with bands of fifes, drums and bagpipes, to celebrate the victory of Protestant King William of Orange over Catholic King James II, on 12 July 1690.

== See also ==
- Protestantism in Ireland
- Roman Catholicism in Ireland
- The Troubles
