= Sheridan Rúitín =

American Celtic folk band

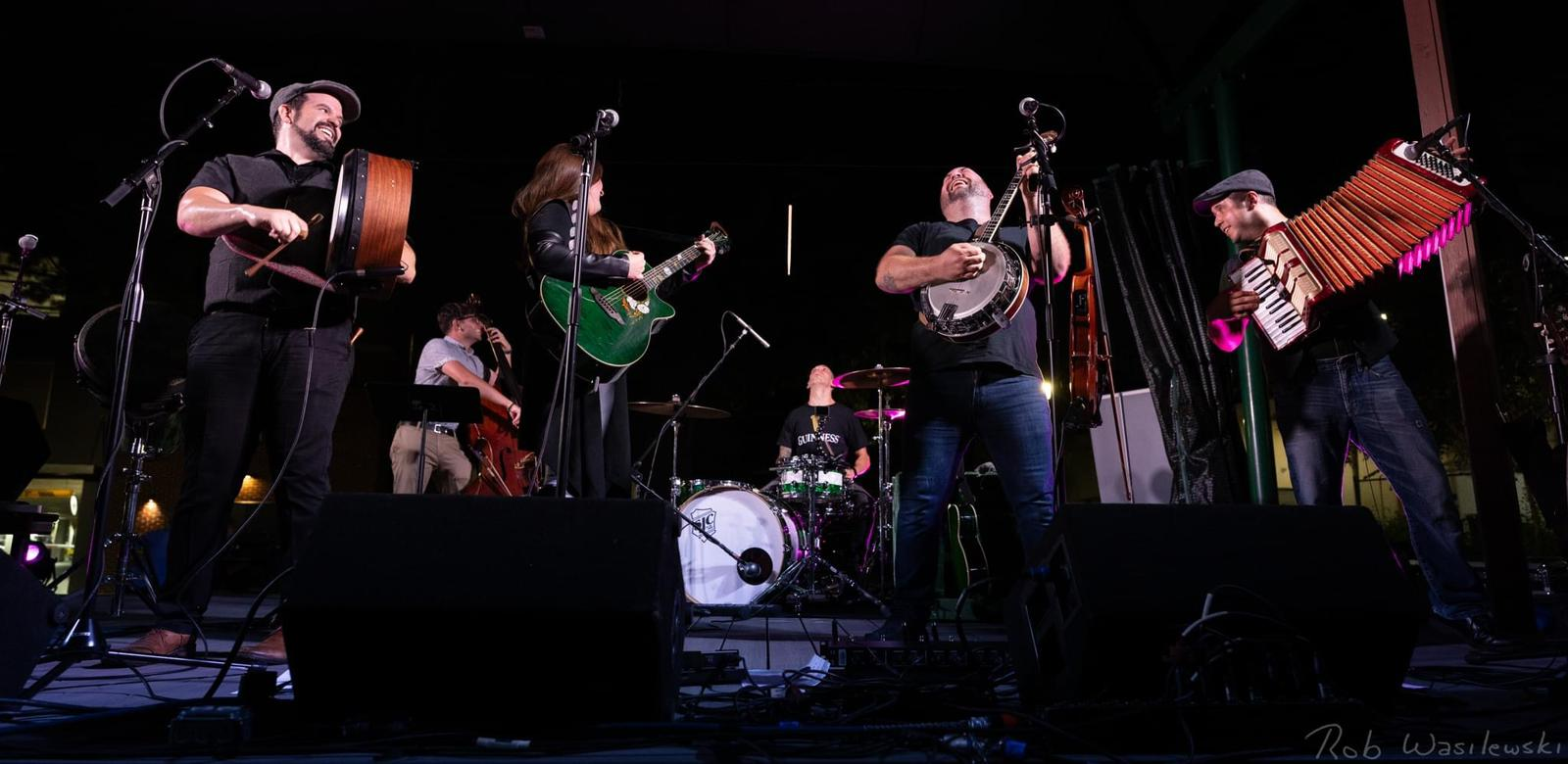
- Sheridan Rúitín Live in 2023 (Woodbridge, NJ)

Background information
- Origin: Rockland County, New York, United States
- Genres: Celtic folk, folk rock
- Years active: 2020–present
- Members: Billy Houlihan; Shannon Cokeley; Tommy Ma; Michael Zayas; John Damiano

Sheridan Rúitín is an American Celtic folk and folk-rock band from Rockland County, New York. The group developed from informal music sessions held in a converted garage pub in Congers, New York, during the COVID-19 pandemic.

The band released its debut studio album, Rebels in the Night, in March 2022. The group has also released three EPs, a live album and additional singles while touring in the United States and Canada. Its second studio album, Freakshow, was released in 2025 and was reviewed by Irish Music Magazine in its 2026 releases annual.

== History ==
=== Formation and Rebels in the Night ===
Sheridan Rúitín formed in 2020 in Congers, New York, developing from informal music sessions held during the COVID-19 pandemic. Billy Houlihan began playing music at a makeshift garage pub operated by his neighbor, John Sheridan.

The band's name originated after Sheridan fell from a bar stool during one of the sessions and broke his ankle; rúitín is an Irish-language word for "ankle".

The group began posting performances online and developing an audience through social media. By April 2024, its cover of "Irish Pub Song", which incorporated videos submitted by viewers, had received approximately 900,000 views on YouTube.

The group initially concentrated on traditional Irish music before beginning to write original material and develop arrangements of traditional songs. This material contributed to the band's debut album, Rebels in the Night, which was released in March 2022. Philippe Cousin reviewed Rebels in the Night for 5 Planètes, discussing the band's mixture of traditional Irish material, original compositions and contemporary arrangements.

Following the release of Rebels in the Night, Sheridan Rúitín began touring and appearing at Irish and Celtic music festivals.

=== Touring and later releases ===
During 2023 and 2024, Sheridan Rúitín appeared at Irish and Celtic festivals in the northeastern United States.

The band appeared at the East Durham Irish Festival in May 2023. It also performed at the 22nd annual Hooley on the Hudson in Kingston, New York, in September 2023.

In 2024, the band's "Keep 'Er Lit" tour included performances in the United States and Canada. Irish Music Magazine reported that the band's 2024 schedule included appearances at the Havertown Irish Festival and other Irish and Celtic music events.

Sheridan Rúitín also appeared at the Rockaway Beach/Breezy Point Irish Festival in June 2024.

In 2024, the group released Live at Rick's Club American. By that year, Irish Music Magazine reported that Sheridan Rúitín had released three EPs, a live album and several singles in addition to its debut studio album.

In July 2025, Sheridan Rúitín released the first single, "Wyld Nite," off its second studio album. Reviewing the song for Roadie Music, Diego Pinheiro characterized it as a blend of traditional folk and pop elements and highlighted its use of Irish mythological imagery.

Sheridan Rúitín released its second studio album, Freakshow, in September 2025. Reviewing the album for Irish Music Magazine, John O'Regan discussed tracks including the title track, "North Georgia Mountains", "Bad Habit" and "Scars of Dublin", as well as the band's arrangements of established Irish material. Philippe Cousin reviewed Freakshow for the February 2026 issue of the French magazine Le Peuple breton. Cousin described the album as combining traditional Irish music with folk and American rock influences and discussed the group's use of the term "Celtwave" for its musical approach.

== Musical style ==
Sheridan Rúitín performs a mixture of traditional Irish music and original material, incorporating elements of Celtic folk and folk rock. Its repertoire includes traditional Irish songs, jigs and reels as well as original compositions and arrangements.

The group has used the term "Celtwave" to describe its approach to combining Celtic musical influences with contemporary folk and rock.

== Members ==
The band's lineup consists of:

- Billy Houlihan – vocals, banjo, bouzouki, fiddle, bagpipes
- Shannon Cokeley – vocals, guitar
- Tommy Ma – vocals, bodhrán
- Michael Zayas – accordion, mandolin
- John Damiano – drums

== Discography ==
=== Studio albums ===
- Rebels in the Night (2022)
- Freakshow (2025)

=== Extended plays ===
- Co. Rockland (2021)
- Only Savage (2023)
- On Mama's Porch (2023)

=== Live albums ===
- Live at Rick's Club American (2024)
