= The Unicorn (song) =

1962 song by Shel Silverstein

Song by Shel Silverstein

from the album Inside Folk Songs
- Released: 1962
- Genre: Folk
- Label: Atlantic Records
- Songwriter: Shel Silverstein
- Producers: Jerry Wexler, Al Brackman

"The Unicorn" is a song written by Shel Silverstein. It was originally released in 1962 on his album Inside Folk Songs (Atlantic 8072).

== Background ==
The lyrics to the song also appear, printed as a poem, based on the biblical tale, Noah's Ark, in Shel Silverstein's book Where the Sidewalk Ends. In the original version of the song, the Irish Rovers speak half of the lyrics, as well as the part of the fourth chorus. The final line is spoken freely without music: "And that's why you'll never see a Unicorn to this very day".

== Irish Rovers recording ==
"The Unicorn"
- Decca 32254

Single by the Irish Rovers

from the album The Unicorn
- B-side: "Black Velvet Band" (most releases); "The Rattling Bog" (UK/Ireland)
- Released: 1968
- Genre: Folk
- Length: 3:18
- Label: Decca (most releases); MCA (UK/Ireland); Festival (Australia)
- Songwriter: Shel Silverstein
- Producer: Charles "Bud" Dant

"The Unicorn" was made very popular by the Irish Rovers in 1968. It remains one of the best-known songs in the Irish Rovers' long career. It sold 8 million copies worldwide and in their native Ireland, the song peaked at #5 on the Irish Singles Chart. In addition, the song was nominated for Best Folk Performance at the 1969 Grammy Awards. Elsewhere, "The Unicorn" peaked at #4 in Canada, and in the US, reached #2 on the US Adult Contemporary Chart, and #7 on the Hot 100. On the New Zealand Listener chart it reached #5.

== Other cover versions ==
Silverstein's songbook, "Dirty Feet" (TRO/Hollis Music, 1969), includes a discography saying that, along with the Irish Rovers and Silverstein's versions, "The Unicorn" had been recorded by

- Bill Anderson (Decca)
- Shay Duffin (RCA)
- Robert Goulet (Columbia)
- Bob Turner (ABC)
- Uncle Bill (Dot). (The record "Uncle Bill Socks It To Ya" was by Burt Wilson, imitating W.C. Fields)
- Will Millar of the Irish Rovers recorded another, earlier version of the song with the St. Michaels Kids. In 1981 Millar opened an Irish pub in Toronto under the name The Unicorn.
- Kidsongs used the song for Good Night, Sleep Tight, but had to leave out the sad portion to make it more kid-friendly.

== Description ==
According to the song, the unicorn was not a fantasy, but a creature who lived in ancient times alongside early humans. They are said to be the loveliest of all animals, and God's favorite, but also playful and silly. This ultimately leads to their extinction; when God announces plans to flood the earth to purge it of human sinning, He specifically instructs Noah to include the unicorns on Noah's Ark. The unicorns refuse to stop playing and come into the ark by the time the rains start, which forced Noah to leave them to drown.
