= The Irish Rovers =

Irish-Canadian musical group

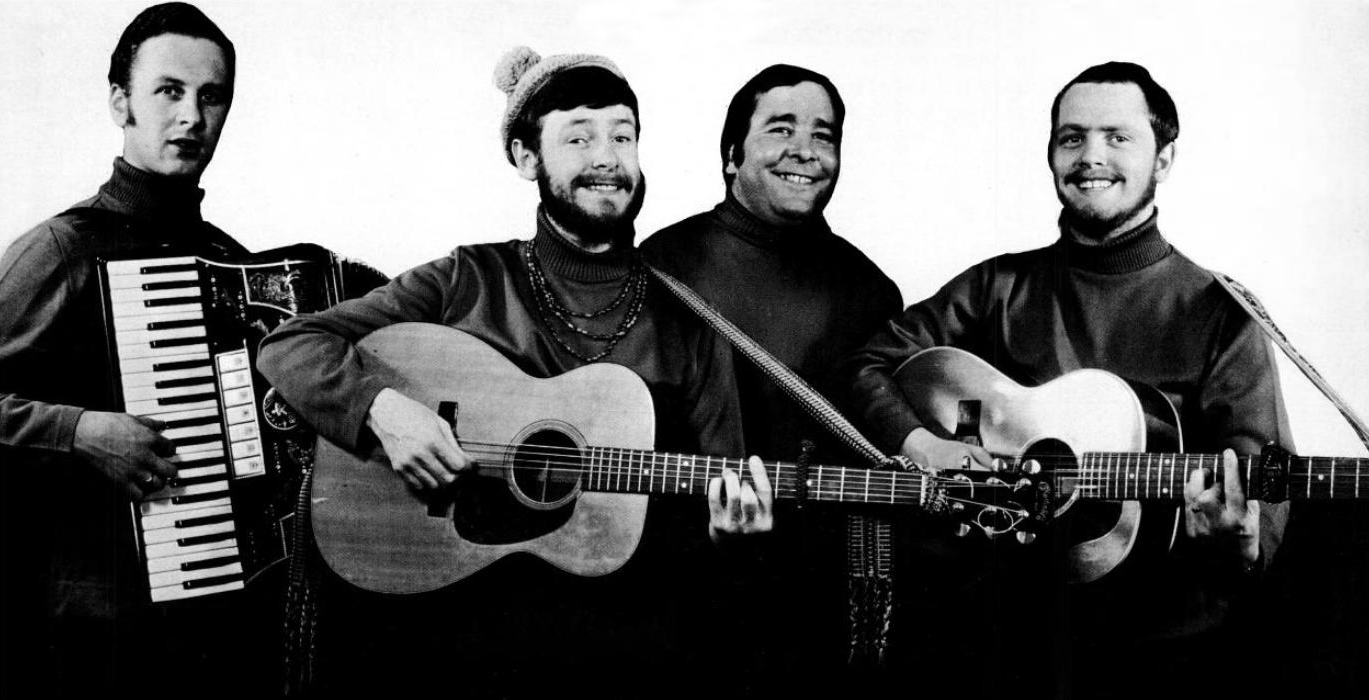
- The Irish Rovers in 1968; left to right: Wilcil McDowell, Will Millar, Jimmy Ferguson and George Millar

Background information
- Also known as: The Rovers
- Origin: Toronto, Ontario, Canada
- Genres: Irish, folk, folk rock
- Years active: 1963–present
- Labels: Rover; DPTV Media; Potato; Varèse Sarabande; Attic; Brunswick; MCA; Festival; Coral; CBS; Universal; Epic; Decca
- Members: George Millar; Ian Millar; Geoffrey Kelly; Davey Walker; Shane Farrell; Jimmy Keane; Neal Ryan; Tom Roach; Ronnie O'Flynn
- Past members: Jimmy Ferguson; Wilcil McDowell; Joe Millar; Will Millar; Vic Marcus; Doug Henderson; Kevin McKeown; Bernie LaBarge; John Reynolds; Sean O'Driscoll; Morris Crum; Wallace Hood; Bill Craig; Paul Lawton; Fred Graham; Gerry O'Connor; Kevin Evans
- Website: irishroversmusic.com

The Irish Rovers is a group of Irish musicians that was formed in Toronto, Ontario, Canada in 1963 and named after the traditional song "The Irish Rover". They are notable for their international television series, for contributing to the popularization of Irish music in North America, and for the songs "The Unicorn", "Drunken Sailor", "Wasn't That a Party", "The Orange and the Green", "Whiskey on a Sunday", "Lily the Pink", "Finnegan's Wake", and "The Black Velvet Band".

The primary voices heard in the group's early songs were Will Millar (tenor), Jimmy Ferguson (baritone), George Millar, and Joe Millar, and in the last twenty years, also John Reynolds and Ian Millar. Wilcil McDowell's accordion was a signature sound of the band for more than fifty five years, until his retirement in 2020.

Founding member George Millar and his cousin Ian are both from Ballymena, Davey Walker from Armagh, Sean O'Driscoll from Cork, Gerry O'Connor from Dundalk, percussionist Fred Graham from Belfast. Flute and whistle player Geoffrey Kelly was born in Dumfries, Scotland.

In the 1980s, the group briefly renamed itself The Rovers. During this period, their song "Wasn't That a Party" led to crossover success in the country rock genre.

The Irish Rovers have represented Canada at five World Expos, and in 2018 were honoured as one of Ireland's greatest exports at Dublin, Ireland's EPIC The Irish Emigration Museum.

In 2023, they celebrated their 60th Anniversary, and their song, "Hey Boys Sing Us A Song" was nominated for Single of the Year in the Canadian Folk Music Awards.

== History ==
=== Northern Ireland ===
The brothers George Millar and Will Millar were both born in Ballymena, County Antrim, Northern Ireland. The children grew up in a musical household as their father Bob played button-key accordion for several bands throughout the years. Their cousin Joe Millar, who also sang, took part in the family kitchen parties playing button-key accordion and harmonica. As children, George and Will performed with their sister, Sandra Beech as "The Millar Kids" in Ireland, before the family emigrated to Canada.

=== The early years ===
In 1963, George met fellow Irish native Jimmy Ferguson at an Irish function in Toronto. They sang together until dawn, and founded the Irish Rovers. According to a Calgary Herald article in 1971, "George and Jimmy formed the first Irish Rovers for an amateur variety show in Toronto and won."

George's cousin, Joe also soon emigrated to Toronto and was recruited as he stepped off the plane.

The name "The Irish Rovers" was suggested by George's mother. The traditional Irish song about a sailing ship had been a favourite from their kitchen parties in Ballymena. George, Jimmy and Joe were briefly joined by Vic Marcus and Doug Henderson. George's father, Bob, became The Irish Rovers's first manager booking the new band at folk song festivals, clubs, hootenannies and The Port o' Call. According to a 1964 newspaper in the Millars' home town in Ireland, "The folk singing 'boom' in the United States and Canada proved profitable for three young Ballymena men who form the nucleus of a popular, Toronto-based group who call themselves 'The Irish Rovers.'"

In the early 1960s, Will Millar and his friend Brian Evans performed in a Toronto Calypso group, The Kalypso Kews. After moving to Calgary, Will formed a folk trio in Calgary along with another Ulster native, Derek Swinson. He also developed quite a following singing at Phil's Pancake House, and then landing a job singing on Calgary's Just 4 Fun, a local TV show for children. "We would go in, singing Irish songs like 'Whiskey, you're the devil' on the show", a quote from their "Best of the Irish Rovers" album CD case booklet.

In the latter half of 1964, after more than six months performing in the Toronto area, George, Jimmy and Joe left to visit Will in Calgary. In 1979, Jimmy told Canadian Music Magazine, "We actually formed the group in Toronto. I sang, George played guitar and at that time Joe was playing a little button key accordion. We were ambitious in those days, we'd played the clubs to death in Toronto and we didn't know what to do next; what direction to take. So we decided to visit Will in Calgary, ended up staying there, and the Irish Rovers became four." Joe moved his family out from Toronto, and the band continued in Calgary.

George was enrolled in a local Calgary high school and Jimmy worked at a local Calgary slaughter house. Jimmy's job would last but a few hours. George soon quit school and Will's home became the new home base for the band.

The Irish Rovers became regulars at Calgary's Depression Coffeehouse, a folk club operated by John Uren that also contributed to the start of Joni Mitchell's career.

=== Down to "Americay" ===
Will introduced the group to his manager Les Weinstein who became the band's full-time manager, while Will became the band leader.

The Rovers drove to California in 1966, ( they appeared at the Ice House in 1965) hoping to perform in the folk clubs there. On the way, their car broke down near Dinucci's Restaurant in Valley Ford, CA which was briefly owned by two Irish immigrants Jerry Murphy and Peter Moran. The boys were given room and board and an introduction to Jan Brainerd, a booking agent who helped them secure an appearance at The Purple Onion in San Francisco where they played sold-out houses for five months. The group was then booked at other folk clubs across California. The area where they stayed on this booking became the inspiration for their song "Mrs. Crandall's Boarding House", according to their 1999 album The best of the Irish Rovers (which has a booklet in the front of its CD case).

In 1966, the Rovers signed a recording contract with Decca Records with Charles Dant and recorded their first album, The First of the Irish Rovers, at The Ice House in Pasadena. The album was successful enough to warrant another album, which included their first hit, which was from a song originally written and recorded in 1962 by Shel Silverstein, The Unicorn. Glen Campbell played guitar on the original recording. After recording the album, Joe left the band for a more "reliable" income for a family man. It was at this time that they invited All-Ireland Champion Wilcil McDowell to join the band. After the success of "The Unicorn", Joe returned to the band. The album included the Irish tunes "The Orange and the Green" and "The Black Velvet Band". Wilcil's accordion has continued to be a signature sound of the band.

Starting in the late 1960s, the Irish Rovers performed on various North American television programs including several appearances on the TV western The Virginian, as well as The Smothers Brothers Comedy Hour, The Mike Douglas Show, The Dating Game, The Pig and Whistle, and The Beachcombers.

In 1968, they were named "Folk Group of the Year" by the predecessor of the JUNO Awards, and in 1969 they received a Grammy Award nomination for "Folk Performance of the Year".

=== The Rovers era ===
In the early 1980s, the group adjusted its style and began aiming itself towards the country-rock field. Renamed The Rovers, the group scored a major international hit with "Wasn't That a Party" and also found success with the Christmas novelty recording "Grandma Got Run Over By a Reindeer". By the late 1980s, however, the group had reverted to their original Irish Rovers branding.

=== On television ===
In 1971, The Irish Rovers were offered their own CBC-produced television series, The Irish Rovers Show. While entertaining a family audience, the show promoted Ireland and Irish music to North Americans. Guest stars included their friends The Clancy Brothers and Tommy Makem, Johnny Cash, Carl Perkins, Bobby Darin, Glen Campbell, Vera Lynn and Anne Murray. Visits from Shari Lewis and her puppets, including Lamb Chop, were audience favourites. There were regularly taped visits to Ireland, Northern Ireland, Scotland, England, New Zealand, Prince Edward Island, Newfoundland, New Brunswick, Banff and Alert – at the tip of Ellesmere Island – the farthest-north inhabited base in the world.

The Irish Rovers Show ran for 7 years, winning an ACTRA Award for Best Variety Performance. Brothers Will and George Millar co-wrote the majority of their original Irish compositions. Producer and Director Ken Gibson and Michael Watt often hosted special effects technicians from Los Angeles who were learning the new green screen technology, which were used for comedic leprechaun segments featuring Will, George and Jimmy, and is later used in The Mother Goose Video Treasury in 1987. The Rovers then continued with another television series on the Global Television Network in conjunction with Ulster Television in Ireland.

Although most of their music focuses on the band's Irish roots, in the early 1980s The Irish Rovers recorded an unknown novelty Christmas song written by Randy Brooks. Record producer Jack Richardson produced The Rovers' album, It Was A Night Like This. The single release of "Grandma Got Run Over by a Reindeer" rose to the top 20 in Canada within a week of airplay. Exposure of the music on television also added to the popularity of their music.

In 1980, their crossover hit recording of Tom Paxton's "Wasn't That a Party", which was inspired by the boys' own after-show partying, put them at the top of the charts again. In 1981, the group starred in their second Canadian TV series: The Rovers Comedy House, a seven-part CBC series of comedy and boisterous Irish music produced by Ken Gibson. For most of the 1980s the band was known as "The Rovers" and followed up hits with songs such as "Chattanoogie Shoe Shine Boy" and "No More Bread and Butter".

Their third television series, Party with the Rovers, ran from 1984 to 1986 with Jack Richardson as musical director and Ken Gibson as Executive Producer. The show was set in a traditional pub setting featuring music sessions with the band performing together with Liam Clancy, Tommy Makem, John Allan Cameron, Kenny Rogers, Lonnie Donegan, Andy Gibb, Rita Coolidge, Ronnie Prophet, and many others. The series was produced for Global in conjunction with Ulster Television in Ireland, and was syndicated around the world.

The band members became Canadian citizens after Canada's Prime Minister, Pierre Elliott Trudeau, asked them to do so, to officially represent Canada around the world. By 1989 they had represented Canada at five world Expos: Montreal (1967), Osaka, Japan (1970), Okinawa, Japan (1976), Vancouver (1986), and Brisbane, Australia (1988). In recognition of their quarter century of contributions of Canadian music to the International music world, they were awarded Canada's top music honour, the Performing Rights Organization's (PROCAN) Harold Moon Award. With their double album 25th Anniversary Collection in 1989, which featured the backing of The Chieftains and songs written by, amongst others, Randy Bachman, Bryan Adams and Jim Vallance, the band was, once again, officially known as The Irish Rovers, but many fans still refer to them as The Rovers.

Will announced his departure in 1994 and has become a successful artist focusing on the Ireland of old as a favourite subject matter. Upon departure, George replaced him as bandleader and hired fellow musicians John Reynolds and Wallace Hood.

After a court battle for the name of "The Irish Rovers", the full band continued to tour, then filmed the video The Irish Rovers, Live and Well, plus the CD, Celtic Collection: The Next Thirty Years. Over the following two years they followed up with two more albums, Gems, and Come Fill Up Your Glasses. While the band was on tour in Worcester, Massachusetts in October 1997, Jimmy Ferguson died of a heart attack.

For a return to television in 2011, the band filmed the television special, The Irish Rovers, Home in Ireland. Locations for the special included Dunluce Castle, Carnlough Harbour, Portglenone, and various spots along the northeast coast of Northern Ireland. The show was transmitted in 2011 and 2012 across the PBS Network in North America.

In 2012, The Irish Rovers Christmas television special, which was filmed at various locations in Banff National Park, Sunshine Village and Chatham-Kent's Capitol Theatre, was shown across the PBS Network throughout the US and Canada and was broadcast in New Zealand on Sky TV.

In 2015, The Rovers filmed their own 50th Anniversary LIVE on St. Patrick's Day concert in Nanaimo, Canada. Shaw Communications also filmed behind the scenes at the event for a music documentary titled The Irish Rovers 50th Anniversary Special. It was broadcast nationally in Canada on SHAW Video on Demand in 2015 and 2016.

The two-DVD set LIVE on St. Patrick's Day which was filmed at The Port Theatre on Vancouver Island and Lismore, Ireland, was released in 2017. All three television specials were released on DVD and may be rebroadcast during the holiday seasons.

=== Rover Records and touring ===
In 1993, the band formed their own record company, Rover Records, which allowed them artistic freedom that as a younger band they could not afford. George Millar continues to write songs for the band, with Rover Records producing their last sixteen albums including Celtic Collection, Come Fill Up Your Glasses, Down by the Lagan Side, Still Rovin' After All These Years, and their Greatest Hits albums, 40 Years a-Rovin', and The Irish Rovers's Gems. Their Irish homeland continues to be the primary subject of their music, as in "Erin's Green Isle", "I'll Return", "Dear Little Shamrock Shore", "Dunluce Castle", "Home to Bantry Bay", "The Dublin Pub Crawl", and "Gracehill Fair".

In 2010, The Irish Rovers marked their 45th anniversary with the release of the CD Gracehill Fair, which won a local music award on their home base of Vancouver Island.

The band returned to the World Music charts in 2011 with their album Home in Ireland.

In 2012, their single "The Titanic", released from their Drunken Sailor album, focused attention on Belfast and the Harland and Wolff shipyard that had built the Titanic a century before. After the song, and accompanying video made headlines in Belfast, Northern Ireland, it was also featured in a Canadian documentary for the CBC which aided in returning the credit of building the ship to the Northern Ireland shipyards of Belfast. The album was produced in response to YouTube activity.

The release of The Irish Rovers, 50 Years compilation album supported their Farewell To Rovin' Tour. They followed that up with the second children's album of their career, Songs For The Wee Folk, then in 2016 another live album and television special. The 50th anniversary of their famed "Unicorn" song in 2017 was marked with re-recording the songs and featuring a new sequel to "The Unicorn" and a video that explained what happened to their ill-fated unicorn for the album Continuing Story of The Unicorn. Scottish singer Jimmie Macgregor joined the band for the Scottish album Up Among The Heather in 2018. 2019 touring took the band across the US and to Ireland where they were honoured in the hometown of Ballymena and in Dublin for all they have done for Ireland and Irish music throughout the world.

With the exception of the COVID-19 pandemic, the band has not taken a break from touring since 1965. Joe Millar retired from the band in 2005 when his son, Ian took up the family ranks. Ian performed with his dad once on stage before taking over his father's spot. With the 2018 departure of Wilcil McDowell from touring, the line-up as of 2026 left co-founder George Millar as the only remaining current member tied to the 1960s lineup.

The pandemic impacted the 2020 release of the Saints And Sinners album on which George wrote and featured "The Banshee's Cry" and "Band Without A Country", both released with videos. During Covid, bandleader George Millar wrote and produced their latest album, No End In Sight, which features "The Wellerman" and "Hey Boys Sing Us A Song", which was nominated Canadian Folk Music Awards Single of the Year.

The sold-out 2023 tour was one of the most extensive tours of the last decade.

== Personnel ==
=== Current members ===
- George Millar – vocals, guitar, bouzouki (1963–present)
- Ian Millar – vocals, bass guitar, guitar (2005–present)
- Geoffrey Kelly – tin whistle, flute, vocals (2008–present)
- Davey Walker – keyboards, vocals (2019–present)
- Shane Farrell – banjo, mandolin, fiddle (2023–present)
- Jimmy Keane – accordion (2023–present)
- Neal Ryan – vocals (2025–present)
- Tom Roach – drums, bodhrán & percussion (2026–present)
- Ronnie O'Flynn – bass guitar (2026–present)

=== Former members ===
- Jimmy Ferguson – vocals (1963–97; died on tour 1997)
- Joe Millar – vocals, accordion, harmonica, bass guitar (1963–68 / 1969–2005; died 2023)
- Vic Marcus – vocals, bass guitar (1963–64; died 2019)
- Doug Henderson – vocals, banjo (1963–64)
- Will Millar – vocals, guitar, banjo, mandolin, tin whistle (1964–94)
- Wilcil McDowell – accordion (1968–2020; retired from touring 2018)
- Kevin McKeown – drums, bodhran, bones, vocals (1984–2002)
- Bernie LaBarge - acoustic guitar, electric guitar, bass, vocals (1984-1992)
- Wallace Hood – mandolin, Irish bouzouki, cittern, tenor banjo, guitar, tin whistle (1995–2005; died 2025)
- John Reynolds – vocals, guitar, tin whistle, harmonica (1995–2012; died 2021)
- Sean O'Driscoll – mandolin, tenor banjo, bouzouki, box, vocals (1997–2021)
- Bill Craig – vocals, guitar (1998)
- Paul Lawton – drums, bodhran, bones (2002–2005; died 2005)
- Fred Graham – drums, bodhran, bones, vocals (2007–2025)
- Bruce Aitken – drums (2007–2008)
- Morris Crum – accordion, keyboards, vocals (2012–2021)
- Gerry O'Connor – fiddle (2013–2025)
- Kevin Evans – vocals, guitar (2023)

While the band was on tour in Worcester, Massachusetts, Irish Rovers co-founder Jimmy Ferguson died of a heart attack on October 8, 1997, at the age of 57.

Drummer Paul Lawton died in Richmond, British Columbia, Canada, on 15 July 2005, at the age of 41.

Bass player Vic Marcus died in Ross Memorial Hospital in Lindsay on 30 August 2019, at age 80.

Singer John Reynolds died on 17 February 2021, in his home in Comox, British Columbia.

Founding Irish Rover Joe Millar died on 10 February 2023, at age 87 after a long battle with Alzheimers. George Millar wrote and dedicated the song "Somebody Loved Me" to Joe.

Former member and tenor banjo and bouzouki player Wallace Hood passed away at his home in Bangor on February 1, 2025.

== Honours ==
- 1968 Winners, RPM Awards (predecessor of the JUNO Award), "Folk Group of the Year"
- 1968 GRAMMY Awards Nomination, "Folk Performance of the Year”
- 1971 Winners ACTRA Award, Best Variety Performance
- 1975 JUNO Award Nomination, Best Album Cover, "Emigrate! Emigrate!”
- 1979 Winners, PROCAN Harold Moon Award for International Achievement for TV Program
- 1981 JUNO Award Nomination, Single of the Year, "Wasn’t That A Party”
- 1981 JUNO Award Nomination, Folk Artist of the Year
- 1982 JUNO Award Nomination, Group of the Year
- 1982 JUNO Award Nomination, Country Group of the Year
- 1982 JUNO Award Nomination, Folk Artist of the Year
- 1983 JUNO Award Nomination, Country Group of the Year
- 2010 Winners, VIMA Award (Vancouver Island Music Awards), SOCAN Song of the Year, "Gracehill Fair"
- 2023 Canadian Folk Music Awards Nomination, Single of the Year, "Hey Boys Sing Us A Song”

== Television specials / VHS and DVD ==
- America's Music: Folk 1 [Volume 7] – VHS, 1983
- Party with the Rovers – VHS, 1988
- The Irish Rovers Silver Anniversary – CBC, 1989
- The Irish Rovers Celebrate 30 Years – CBC,1994
- Celebrate! The First Thirty Years – VHS, 1994
- Live and Well – VHS, 1995
- Home In Ireland – PBS TV / DVD, 2011
- The Irish Rovers Christmas – PBS TV / DVD, 2012
- 50th Anniversary, LIVE on St. Patrick's Day – SHAW TV on Demand / 2 DVD Set, 2017

== Television series, international ==
- The Irish Rovers – 1971, 7 years. CBC
- The Rovers Comedy House – 1981, 2 years. Global Television / Ulster TV
- Party with The Rovers – 1984, 3 years. Global Television / Ulster TV
- Superspecial – 1980's. CBC

== Discography ==
=== Albums ===
Year	Album	Chart Positions				
Year	Album	CAN	CAN Country	US	US Country	US World
1966	The First of the Irish Rovers	—	—	—	—	—
1967	The Unicorn	—	—	24	—	—
1968	All Hung Up	—	—	119	—	—
1969	The Life of the Rover	—	—	—	—	—
1969	Tales to Warm Your Mind	—	—	182	—	—
1971	On the Shores of Americay	73	—	—	—	—
1972	The Best of the Irish Rovers	—	—	—	—	—
1972	The Irish Rovers Live	—	—	—	—	—
1973	Emigrate! Emigrate!	—	—	—	—	—
1974	Greatest Hits	—	—	—	—	—
1976	Children of the Unicorn	—	—	—	—	—
1976	The Irish Rovers in Australia	—	—	—	—	—
1979	Tall Ships and Salty Dogs	—	—	—	—	—
1980	The Rovers	26	1	—	—	—
1980	Wasn't That a Party	—	—	157	38	—
1981	No More Bread and Butter	—	—	—	—	—
1982	Party Album	—	—	—	—	—
1982	Pain in My Past	—	—	—	—	—
1982	It Was a Night Like This	—	—	—	—	—
1984	Twentieth Anniversary	—	—	—	—	—
1985	Party with the Rovers	—	—	—	—	—
1989	Hardstuff	67	—	—	—	—
1989	Silver Anniversary	—	—	—	—	—
1992	The Boys Come Rolling Home	—	—	—	—	—
1993	Years May Come, Years May Go	—	—	—	—	—
1994	Celebrate! The First 30 Years	—	—	—	—	—
1995	Celtic Collection: The Next Thirty Years	—	—	—	—	—
1996	The Irish Rovers' Gems	—	—	—	—	—
1998	Come Fill Up Your Glasses	—	—	—	—	—
1999	Best of the Irish Rovers	93	—	—	—	14
1999	Songs of Christmas	—	—	—	—	—
2000	Down by the Lagan Side	—	—	—	—	—
2002	Another Round	—	—	—	—	—
2003	Live in Concert	—	—	—	—	—
2005	40 Years a-Rovin'	—	—	—	—	—
2007	Still Rovin' After All These Years	—	—	—	—	—
2010	Gracehill Fair	—	—	—	—	—
2011	Home in Ireland	—	—	—	—	11
2011	Merry Merry Time of Year	—	—	—	—	—
2012	Drunken Sailor	—	—	—	—	—
2014	50 Years	—	—	—	—	—
2015	Songs for the Wee Folk	—	—	—	—	—
2016	50th Anniversary, LIVE on St. Patrick's Day	—	—	—	—	—
2017	The Unicorn, The Continuing Story	—	—	—	—	—
2019	Up Among the Heather, The Scottish Album	—	—	—	—	—
2020	Saints And Sinners	—	—	—	—	—
2022	No End In Sight	—	—	—	—	—
2025	60 Years A~Roving!	67	—	—	—	—
2025	The Belfast Sessions	—	—	—	—	—

=== Singles ===
Year	Single	Chart Positions						
Year	Single	CAN	CAN AC	CAN Country	AUS	IRL	US	US AC
1967	"Orange & Green"	—	—	—	—	—	—	—
1968	"The Unicorn"	4	—	—	—	5	7	2
1968	"Black Velvet Band"	—	—	—	—	—	—	—
1968	"Whiskey on a Sunday (The Puppet Song)"	34	—	—	—	—	75	9
1968	"The Biplane, Ever More"	50	—	—	—	—	91	13
1968	"The Rovers Street Song Medley" (Unreleased)	—	—	—	—	—	—	—
1969	"Lily the Pink"	38	7	—	—	—	113	15
1969	"Peter Knight"	98	—	—	—	—	—	—
1969	"Did She Mention My Name"	—	—	—	—	—	—	—
1970	"Rhymes and Reasons"	76	11	—	83	—	—	—
1970	"Years May Come, Years May Go"	92	9	—	—	—	—	—
1972	"Lord of the Dance"	—	26	—	—	—	—	—
1973	"Morningtown Ride"	83	39	—	—	—	—	—
1974	"The Gypsy"	—	30	—	—	—	—	—
1980	"Wasn't That a Party" (credited as The Rovers)	3	1	9	61	—	37	46
1981	"Mexican Girl"	—	6	43	—	—	—	—
1981	"Chattanoogie Shoe Shine Boy"	—	10	—	—	—	—	—
1982	"Pain in My Past"	—	—	39	—	—	—	—
1982	"People Who Read People Magazine"	—	—	—	—	—	—	—
1982	"Grandma Got Run Over by a Reindeer"	—	20	—	—	—	—	—
1985	"Everybody's Making It Big but Me"	—	10	38	—	—	—	—
1989	"Other Side of the Evening", "Finnegan's Wake", "All Sing Together", "Paddy on the Turnpike"	—	—	—	—	—	—	—
2012	"The Titanic"	—	—	—	—	—	—	—
2012	"Whores and Hounds"	—	—	—	—	—	—	—
2020	"The Irish Reggae Band"	—	—	—	—	—	—	—
2022	"The Wellerman"	—	—	—	—	—	—	—
2023	"Hey Boys Sing Us A Song"	—	—	—	—	—	—	—
