= Slapstick Festival =

Film festival in Bristol, England

== History ==
Slapstick Festival is an annual celebration of silent, visual and classic film comedy held every year in Bristol, Southwest England. It is an annual event that is dedicated to showcasing silent visual and classic comedy. It features rare, archived films from around the world. The festival aims to source original film prints and present them, accompanied by live improvised music. These events take place in key venues in Bristol, such as The Bristol Old Vic, The Bristol Beacon, and The Watershed.

Since 2009, the festival has awarded the Aardman Slapstick Awards, which were developed in 2008. Notable recipients include Eric Sykes, Ken Dodd, and French and Saunders.

== Awards ==
=== Aardman Slapstick Comedy Legend Award ===
Slapstick Festival presents this award in collaboration with Aardman Animations. Winners are selected by a panel of comedy heroes, previous recipients and festival patrons. This award is dedicated to honouring contemporary comedians who have left an lasting mark on the realm of onscreen and live comedy. The trophy itself, featuring the beloved Aardman character Morph is sculpted by Aardman's model shop to capture the essence of the awardee.

Past winners:

- 2013: June Whitfield
- 2014: Barry Humphries
- 2015: Barry Cryer
- 2016: Ken Dodd
- 2017: Dawn French and Jennifer Saunders
- 2019: Julie Walters
- 2024: Robert Lindsay
- 2025: Ben Elton
- 2026: Armando Iannucci

=== Aardman Slapstick Visual Comedy Award ===
Created to recognise the excellence of comedians and film makers in the field of visual comedy. The award is a Morph sculpted to resemble the recipient.

Past winners:

- 2009: Eric Sykes
- 2010: Michael Palin
- 2011: The Goodies
- 2012: Pierre Étaix
- 2015: Vic Reeves and Bob Mortimer
- 2016: Michael Crawford
- 2024 Terry Gilliam

=== Slapstick Legacy Award ===
This award is given to performers and filmmakers who have created Slapstick and Visual comedy onscreen work worthy of mention alongside the original performers in early silent comedy.

- 2025: Ryland Brickston Cole Tews: Hundreds of Beavers
- 2024: Sylvester McCoy: Vision On, Dr Who, The Ken Campbell Roadshow
- 2023: Harry Hill: Harry Hill's Lonely Island (2021-2)
- 2022: Tiswas presented to Chris Tarrant, Sally James, Bob Carolgees and John Gorman
- 2021: Remy Archer & Tom Gaskin: Snake Oil
- 2018: The Young Ones
- 2017: Roy Hudd
- 2016: Steve Pemberton, Reece Shearsmith & David Kerr: A Quiet Night In
- 2015: Matt Lucas: Pompidou TV series (2014)

== Musical Accompaniment ==
The Slapstick Festival is committed to presenting silent films and classic comedies as they were originally experienced. Every silent film screening is accompanied by live music, with pianists improvising scores to match the mood of each film. Additionally, the Slapstick Silent Comedy Gala at Bristol Beacon features live orchestral scores.

Regular musicians include Günter A. Buchwald, John Sweeney, Stephen Horne, and others.
