= Saturday Stayback =

1983 British television series

- Presented by: Chris Tarrant; Helen Atkinson-Wood; Bob Carolgees
- Country of origin: United Kingdom
- Original language: English
- No. of series: 1
- No. of episodes: 6

Production
- Production company: Central (1982)

Original release
- Network: ITV
- Release: 22 January – 26 February 1983

Related
- Tiswas; O.T.T.

Saturday Stayback (titled Stayback within the programme itself) was a late-night comedy show that was aired for six episodes from 22 January until 26 February 1983 on the UK ITV network. It starred Chris Tarrant and was made by Central Television.

Saturday Stayback was a follow-up to the short-lived O.T.T., itself a spin-off from Tiswas. From these previous shows were regulars Bob Carolgees and Helen Atkinson-Wood, as well as newcomer to television Tony Slattery. Guest appearances included Frank Carson and, making his TV debut, impressionist Phil Cool.

Each episode was filmed on location in a different pub in the English midlands with regular patrons taking part in proceedings.

== History ==
O.T.T. had been a critical disaster for Central, and had angered the Independent Broadcasting Authority (the commercial television watchdog), so instead of automatically granting a second series, they decided to slash the budget and insisted on pre-recording instead of the show going out live. This decision so enraged producer/presenter Chris Tarrant, who had been largely responsible for the success of Central's Tiswas, that after the meeting with management, he slammed the door so hard that the glass shattered.

Due to the low budget circumstances and keen to keep a laddish air about the format, the decision was made to film from a local pub, and portray it as though they were in an illegal after-hours drinking session. This gave the show the name 'Stayback', which was included in the opening titles and break bumpers, but by the time Central were ready to transmit it, it was decided to be referred to as 'Saturday Stayback', despite this name never being used in the programme.

Tarrant's friend from Tiswas and O.T.T., John Gorman, was used on this show for writing, keeping himself off-screen. Ex-Tiswas presenter Sally James (another friend of Tarrant) was a guest in one show. Kevin Seisay wrote and performed some of the comedy songs.

Musical guests included Roy Wood, who also contributed the theme tune, heavy rockers Gillan and two appearances by Thin Lizzy.

Saturday Stayback was not a major ratings success and was heavily outperformed by Jasper Carrott's then-current show. Similarly to O.T.T., which had run for one series only, Saturday Stayback ended after its initial run of six episodes.

== Episode guide ==
- 22 January 1983
- Frank Carson, Doorkeeper / Opening Titles / Chris Tarrant Intro / Da Doo Ron Ron / Patent Office Sketch / The Eurovision Gurning Competition / Police Sketch / Frank Carson Jokes / The Eurovision Gurning Competition (continued) / Pub Sketch / Karl Malden's Nose / Houdi-Elbow / Breakfast Argument / Frank Carson Joke / Link From Chris and Bob / Football Manager Sketch / Link From Frank Carson / Cold Sweat by Thin Lizzy / Bedroom Sketch / Commercial Break / Man in Pyjamas / Two Women Talking / Picking Up a Girl / Economy Version of Dallas / Frank Carson Jokes / Mick Jagger Impression / Classified Adverts Sketch / Bathtub Sketch / Rolf Harris Impression / Snig Boy / Frank Carson Joke / Link From Chris and Frank Carson / Hortense Loves Adolf Hitler, and Closing Credits / Channel 4 Announcer / Throwing-out Time /
- 29 January 1983
- Chris and Bob Intros (outtakes) / Opening Titles / 21 Today / Dandruff Commercial / Dead Cat / Important Message / Actor in Hospital / Jim Bowen Joke / Chris Tarrant Link / Pete Best / Roget's Novel / Blind Date / Houdi-Elbow / Jim Bowen Joke / Man in Pyjamas / Jim Bowen Joke / Lancashire Dreadlock Man / Recession Joke / Confession Box / Rolf Harris Impression / Chris Tarrant Link / If You Wanna Be Happy by Rocky Sharpe and the Replays / Joan Collins Joke / Commercial Break / David Frost on TV-am / Bedroom Quiz / Beethoven's Hair / Prisoner Sketch / Pub Conversation / Jim Bowen Joke / One Player Short / Lucky Dip / Link From Chris and Bob / Oxfam Jumpers Song / Jim Bowen Joke / Chris Tarrant Link, and Dirty Video / My Psychiatrist Thinks I'm Immature / Bedroom Sketch / Shout! Shout! (Knock Yourself Out) by Rocky Sharpe and the Replays, and Closing Credits /
- 5 February 1983
- Directions For Chas and Dave / Opening Titles / Chris Tarrant Intro, and Can I Have Your Glasses? / Aliens From Outer Space / Interrogating Bacon / Bernard Manning Joke / The Eurovision Gurning Competition (continued) / The Big Match Commentators / Houdi-Elbow / This Beer is Off / Sex Therapy Man / Bernard Manning Joke / The Disappearing Lady (Sally James) / Bob and Baby / Marriage Bureau Questionnaire / The Eurovision Gurning Competition (continued) / Yard of Ale and Elephant Impression / Sex Makes Me Bilious / Bernard Manning Joke / Chris Tarrant Link / London Girls by Chas 'n' Dave / Commercial Break / Alka-Seltzer / Mugger Express / Bernard Manning Joke / Marriage Confession / Rolf Harris Impression / Bob and Baby / Punks in a Pub / Man in Pyjamas / Sun Reporter at Breakfast / Charlsberg Lager / Nazi Song / Wedding Vows / Private Dentist / Two Women Talking / Ice Dance Champion / Avenge-a-Gram / Chris Tarrant Link / Bob Marley Tribute / Bernard Manning Joke / Link From Chris and Bob / Bin Men Song, and Closing Credits / Groping in the Back of a Car (unfinished) /
- 12 February 1983
- Chris's Round / Opening Titles / Chris Tarrant Intro / Charlie Daze Joke / The 1983 Barry Manilow Endurance Test / Gee, Thanks a Million, Silly Gillian / Whicker's World / Swedes / Bedroom Sketch / Charlie Daze Joke / Premium Bonds / The Alphabet Song by Foundation / Food at the Bar / The Pope / Private Hospital / Charlie Daze Jokes / Two Women Talking / Russian Domino Game / Kevin's Theory / Bob and Baby / Rolf Harris Impression / Bedroom Sketch / Commercial Break / Four Minute Warning / Charlie Daze Joke / Pub Chat / I Lost My Cherry by Foundation / On a Train / Charlie Daze Joke / Chris Tarrant Introduces the Band / Chas 'n' Dave Outtakes (including John Gorman's voice) / We Are the Boys Who Make All the Noise (rock 'n' roll medley) by Phil Lynott, Bev Bevan, Roy Wood and Chas Hodges, momentarily interrupted by Man in Pyjamas / A Changed Man / My Sister's Heart-throb is a Zulu, and Closing Credits / Chris Tarrant Announcements, and Roy Wood on Bagpipes / Spelling Argument /
- 19 February 1983
- Two Women Talking and Pervert / Opening Titles / Chris and Bob Joke / Chatting Her Up / Norman Collier Joke / Candy the Escort / Kevin's Bet / Cable Television / Chris Tarrant Link / Germany's Leading Country and Western Singer / Cable Television (continued) / Russian Roulette / Abbreviations / Norman Collier Joke / Directory Enquiries / Ranji Ram, the Indian Man / Sleeping Beauty / Eton Reunion / Houdi-Elbow / That's My Girl You're Groping / Jim Bowen Joke / Italian Action Man / Wife Swapping / Man in Pyjamas / BBC Newsreader / Morbid Conversation / Have One For Yourself / Norman Collier Joke / Crisps / Weirdo Video Library / Jack and the Beanstalk / Knock Me a Kiss by Paul Jones / Norman Collier Joke / Cricket on the Radio / Philosophy Lecturer / Arsonist / Russian Gymnast / Wallbanger / Clueless Doctor / Chris Tarrant Link / I Just Want to Be a Cannibal / Bob and Baby / Stuttering Song, and Closing Credits /
- 26 February 1983
- Complaints / Opening Titles / Chris Tarrant Intro / Chatting Up the Barmaid / Bernard Manning Joke / Hair Colouring / The Paranoiac Society / Medieval World of Sport (Fred Dinenage) / Blue Nun / Alien Mum and Son / Cigarette Machine / Two Women Talking / Vasectomy Song / Political Interview / Frankenstein and Igor / Venison / The Joys of Not Having Sex / Bernard Manning Joke / Castrated / Man in Pyjamas / Chris and Kevin Link / Main Attraction by Suzi Quatro / Alcohol-Free Lager / Commercial Break (EDITED OUT) / Spelling Mistake / Can I Marry Tania? / Bernard Manning Joke / Directing Kevin / Romeo and Juliet / PMT Song / Tomorrow's Front Page / Bernard Manning Joke / My Friend Jackie's Got a Big Kawasaki / Rolf Harris Impression
