= Concentration (British game show) =

British TV quiz show (1959–1960)

- Genre: Game show
- Presented by: David Gell; Chris Howland; Nick Jackson; Bob Carolgees
- Country of origin: United Kingdom
- Original language: English
- No. of series: 1 (Granada era); 2 (TVS era)
- No. of episodes: 70 (Granada era); 23 (TVS era)

Production
- Running time: 30 minutes (inc. adverts)
- Production companies: Granada (1959–60); TVS in association with Mark Goodson Productions and Talbot Television (1988–90)

Original release
- Network: ITV
- Release: 16 June 1959 – 7 June 1960
- Release: 4 September 1988 – 2 March 1990

Related
- Concentration (US version)

Concentration is a game show originally aired from 16 June 1959 to 7 June 1960 by Granada and was initially hosted by David Gell from its inception in 1959 (Chris Howland and David Gell each hosted in 1960).

It was later revived by TVS from 4 September 1988 to 2 March 1990, hosted first by Nick Jackson, then by Bob Carolgees with some of Carolgees’ episodes directed by his former Tiswas colleague and member of The Scaffold, John Gorman.

Both versions were shown on ITV, while the American version with Alex Trebek was also shown by Sky One in the 1990s. A small scale format of the game (called Pick A Pair) also was used in the BBC Saturday morning children's programme The Saturday Picture Show in the mid 1980s.

== Format ==
Two contestants sat before a game board divided up into 30 squares (25 in the TVS era). Behind each square was part of a rebus (pictures and symbols that make up a word or phrase), names of prizes, and special squares.

One at a time, the contestants called out two numbers. If the prizes or special action did not match, the opponent took a turn. However, if the contestant did match, that prize was placed on a board behind the contestant; or, he/she could perform an action. The second number had to be called out within a certain time limit, otherwise the contestant's turn ended.

More importantly, a match also revealed two pieces of the rebus. The contestant could try to solve the rebus by making one guess or choose two more numbers. There was no penalty for a wrong guess; even if he/she was wrong, he/she kept control. Usually, a contestant waited to solve the puzzle until he/she had exposed a good portion of the rebus through several matches. In rare instances, the puzzle was solved with only a few clues showing.

=== Special Squares ===
- Wild card: Provided an automatic match. When a wild card match was made, the natural match was also located resulting in three puzzle parts being revealed. Choosing two wild cards in one turn earned the contestant a £50 bonus in 1989 and £100 in 1990.
- Take: In 1988, there were two red "takes" and two green "takes" and a colour match had to be made. If a contestant matched two "takes" of the same colour, he/she could take his/her choice of any of the prizes listed on their opponent's prize board at any time after making a match. From 1989 to 1990, only one red pair of "take" cards would be hidden and the player who matched them immediately took the last prize the opponent matched.
- Swap: Introduced in 1989, the "swap" pair (which replaced the green "take" cards) allowed that player to "swap" (or forfeit) a prize for a choice of three money cards with hidden amounts (either £1, £50, or £100).

In 1959, each winner played up to three games. In December, the limit decreased to two. Each losing player received £10. On the TVS series, three rounds were always played no matter what the outcome, and the first to solve two puzzles won the game. Both players kept all prizes matched.

=== Global Game ===
The bonus round, dubbed the "Global Game", was played for one of eight holidays. The contestant was shown a board of 15 numbered panels, behind which seven of the eight holidays had matching pairs; the eighth was always used as a decoy. Contestants were given 50 seconds (45 in series 2), and if a contestant made all seven matches, the last holiday he/she matched was the one won.

== Transmissions ==
=== Granada era ===
Series	Start date	End date	Episodes
1	16 June 1959	7 June 1960	70

=== TVS era ===
Series	Start date	End date	Episodes
1	4 September 1988	20 November 1988	13
2	29 December 1989	2 March 1990	10
