= Clive Griffiths =

Clive Griffiths may refer to:

- Clive Griffiths (politician) (born 1928), Western Australian politician
- Clive Griffiths (rugby) (born 1954), Welsh dual-code rugby footballer and coach
- Clive Griffiths (footballer) (1955–2022), played in the North American Soccer League
- Clive Griffiths, bass guitar player, member of the Four Bucketeers
