= O.T.T. (TV series) =

1982 British television series

- Presented by: Chris Tarrant; Helen Atkinson-Wood; Lenny Henry; Bob Carolgees; John Gorman
- Country of origin: United Kingdom
- Original language: English
- No. of series: 1
- No. of episodes: 12

Production
- Production company: Central (1982)

Original release
- Network: ITV
- Release: 2 January – 3 April 1982

Related
- Tiswas; Saturday Stayback

O.T.T. ("Over the Top") is a late-night adult version of the anarchic ATV children's show Tiswas, and was made by its ITV franchise successor Central Independent Television. It was broadcast at 11.00pm on Saturday nights for one series from 2 January until 3 April 1982. O.T.T. was created and presented by Chris Tarrant, and also starred Tiswas performers John Gorman, Lenny Henry and Bob Carolgees. Helen Atkinson-Wood was the female sidekick replacement for Sally James, who stayed behind to present the concurrent and final season of Tiswas alone.

Although O.T.T. was short-lived and did not get a second series, Saturday Stayback, a similarly-formatted show involving several of the same people appeared the following year.

== Origins ==
The programme's origins can be traced to Tarrant and Gorman discussing the future, accepting they couldn't go on forever doing a kids' programme, and exploring the idea of doing a 'grown-up, late-night Tiswas'. Gorman's The Bucket Of Water Song getting into the top 30, and a successful nationwide tour with Tarrant, Sally James and Bob Carolgees as The Four Bucketeers, confirmed there was an 'adult' audience out there.

Initially, the aim had been to do Tiswas in the morning and O.T.T. in the evening; but it was felt this wouldn't work. On 28 March 1981, Tarrant, Carolgees and Gorman left Tiswas to start work on O.T.T..

In January 1982, Chris Tarrant told Kenneth Kennaugh: "We know Tiswas has enormous potential appeal for adults. Quite what that appeal was remained remarkably ill-defined." The same article stated Lenny Henry "doesn't know what he will be doing in tonight's O.T.T.. But one thing is sure. When the show ends he'll be standing under a hot shower - 'just to recover' ... Henry loves the uncontrolled humour where even he never knows what is going to happen next. Tiswas was marvellous to work on. It was a new style of lunatic humour, and we got away with murder. When I first started Tiswas, my nerves used to go before each show simply because it was live. But now, in O.T.T., I just get on with it."

== Series ==
Later, in his book Great Bus Journeys of the World, Alexei Sayle said of his time on the show: "I was good, Lenny Henry was good, the show was packed with vibrant life... it was happy to come from Birmingham and not tainted with Londoniswhereitsatism... despite being short-lived, it was very popular amongst adults, with 7-8 million viewers."

== The name OTT ==
An abbreviation of the phrase "over the top". The origin of the name came about when John Gorman, working with Chris on a late-night version of Tiswas, compiled a list of possible titles; which included BigTis and OTT. It was Mike Palin who 'voted' for the O.T.T. title.

Rick Wakeman told an interview with Tiswas Online he was a member of "an elite showbiz club called 'Over The Top' in the late seventies. I became chairman and the president was a record plugger called Allan James, who also used to supply some of the music acts for Tiswas. We would all meet up in restaurants. There were about 20 of us in all, and, whilst the evening meal would start quite normally, it usually ended in ejection or sometimes arrest as things became very similar to that of the Tiswas programme. We called ourselves the Over the Top Club. Membership was elite and we were banned eventually from at least nine restaurants, to my knowledge."

== Episode guide ==
12 regular episodes and two specials (Russel Hardy and The Best of OTT) were broadcast.

The 6 March edition was not transmitted live due to Magnum Force overtaking half of the OTT's timeslot.
