= Phil Cool =

English comedian

- Born: Philip Martin; April 1948 (age 77); Chorley, Lancashire, England
- Occupation(s): Comedian, impressionist, author, musician, songwriter
- Years active: 1981–2013

Phil Cool (born Philip Martin; April 1948) is a retired English comedian, impressionist and musician. He starred in his own television series Cool It (1985–1990), Cool Head (1991) and Phil Cool (1992), and performed as a touring comedian until his retirement in 2013.

== Early life ==
Born in Chorley, Lancashire, Cool discovered that he had a skill for pulling faces when he was a 12-year-old at school. Once he left school he worked briefly in a warehouse and as an electrician before turning professional as a comedian and impressionist.

== Career ==
Whereas many of his impressionist peers concentrated on mimicking the voice of the target and changing in and out of a succession of make-up and costumes, Cool instead placed an emphasis on thrusting his eyebrows, lips and even, seemingly, his ears into the positions required of the part.

Cool's debut television appearance was in the short-lived comedy show Rock With Laughter, it was around this time that he made a career-defining performance at Jasper Carrott's Folk Club "The Boggery". Carrott was impressed with Cool's act and decided to take an active hand in furthering his career. In 1983 he appeared as a regular on the O.T.T. spin-off Saturday Stayback and, in 1984, he became one of the voice artists for the satirical show Spitting Image, impersonating Boy George, Holly Johnson and Mick Jagger for the first two series. It was during his time on Spitting Image that a producer for the BBC spotted him, and got him work on Pebble Mill at One.

After the success of these appearances, he was given his own series called Cool It (BBC). The first series of Cool It was repeated within a matter of months. There was a tie-in video release of the best moments of Cool It. The second series aired in 1986 and was also produced by Jasper Carrott. The BBC released another video Cool It Too. Cool recorded an album on Virgin Records called Not Just a Pretty Face, and a book titled Cool's Out. In 1987, he performed at The Secret Policeman's Third Ball. The third and final series was broadcast in 1988.

In 1989 he appeared in the mini-film Night of the Comic Dead alongside Frank Carson, Karl Howman and Howard Lew Lewis as part of A Night of Comic Relief 2. His third video, Cool 'N' Hot, was filmed live at the Royal Leamington Spa Centre in 1989. In 1991 he moved to ITV and made a series called Cool Head (Central Television).

In the same year Central released a video showcasing some of the best moments of Cool Head. A year later he made another series for Central that was entitled Phil Cool, recorded at the Belgrade Theatre in Coventry. This turned out to be Cool's last series for television.

In 1992 Cool teamed up with Jasper Carrott and toured the country with their "Carrott & Cool" show. The "Carrott & Cool" tour was the subject for one episode of A Day in the Life for Channel 4 in 1993. The episode took a behind-the-scenes look at the show and tour. He had a brief comeback in 1997 when he released his fifth official video, Classic Cool (this has been reissued on DVD), but in August 2000 his career had to be put on hold when he suffered a heart attack, which left him in hospital for eight months.

After making a full recovery he returned to the stage with a new show in 2002, and in 2003 he revived his touring partnership with Carrott. He is now a resident in Chipping, Lancashire. In addition to his solo gigs, Cool toured in 2008 with Ken Nicol, performing as Nicol and Cool, providing a blend of music and comedy impressions. Nicol and Cool toured with folk rock group Fairport Convention as a support act for Fairport's 2009 winter tour. They released an album, also called Nicol & Cool.

Cool's most recent television and film work has been an appearance on Today with Des and Mel in 2006, being interviewed as part of the BBC's The Story of Light Entertainment and appearing in the movies Upstaged (2005) and The School That Roared (2009).

Cool's autobiography, Phil Cool Died Here (And Lived To Tell The Tale), was followed by a book of 'Art Brut'-inspired sketches of children.

In 2013 Cool began a farewell nationwide tour, declaring it would be his last because he had "just had enough of all the travelling".

== Legacy ==
Writing for the BBC in 2003, author Mark Lewisohn said: "Cool was an amazing talent... able to contort his features into a caricature semblance of the intended victim. Sometimes so uncanny was this facial transformation that he didn't need traditional sketch material."

The 2008 album CSI:Ambleside by Half Man Half Biscuit contains a song called "National Shite Day", in which a character named "Stringy Bob" had been locked up for sending Phil Cool a dead bird in the mail, with a note that said "Is this your sanderling?".

In a 2013 interview, comedian and director Stephen Merchant remarked: "Cool could genuinely contort his face; he was kind [of] extraordinary as an impressionist because he would actually change his face, without makeup, to look like the people he was doing. And he did this Aquaphibian and he scrunched his face up, and I remember just actually weeping with laughter. I had never seen anything as funny as that."

== Videography ==
- Cool It (1985)
- Cool It Too (1986)
- Cool 'n' Hot (1989)
- Cool Head (1991)
- How To Cheat at Fishing (1995)
- Classic Cool (1997)

== See also ==
- Cool It
