= Pullover =

Pullover, pull-over or pull over may refer to:

- Sweater or hoodie, a piece of clothing "pulled over" the head instead of buttoned or zipped-up
- Pullover (TV series), early-1980s UK children's television programme
- Pullover Productions, UK producer of Pullover TV series
- A scenic overlook, road shoulder or layby where a motorist can pull over out of through-traffic lanes
- Pullover (exercise), a weight-training exercise
- Pullover (horizontal bar) is a basic gymnastics movement that brings the athlete to the top of the bar
- A traffic stop, a practice by police enforcement patrolling roadways
- "Pull Over" (song), a 2000 song by Trina
