= Castlehaven (disambiguation) =

Castlehaven is a civil parish in County Cork, Ireland.

Castlehaven or Castle Haven may also refer to:

- Castlehaven GAA, a Gaelic football club in the parish
- Battle of Castlehaven, a 1601 naval battle in the bay off the parish, in the Nine Years' War
- Earl of Castlehaven, a title in the Peerage of Ireland
- Castle Haven, an Iron Age hill fort near Borgue, Dumfries and Galloway, Scotland
- Castle Haven (TV series), a British soap opera
