= How Dare You! (TV series) =

- Genre: Children's game show
- Presented by: Clive Webb (1984–87); John Gorman (1984–87); Floella Benjamin (1984); Cheryl Baker (1985); Carrie Gray (1985–87)
- Theme music composer: "Stay Out Of My Life" by 5 Star (1987)
- Country of origin: United Kingdom
- Original language: English
- No. of series: 3
- No. of episodes: 54 (inc. 1 special)

Production
- Running time: 25 minutes (1984–85); 15 minutes (1987)
- Production company: Tyne Tees Television

Original release
- Network: ITV
- Release: 10 April 1984 – 15 July 1987

How Dare You! is a children's game show that aired on ITV from 10 April 1984 to 15 July 1987.

Cheryl Baker and Carrie Gray presented alternate editions recorded during 1984.

== Transmissions ==
=== Series ===
Series	Start date	End date	Episodes
1	10 April 1984	10 July 1984	13
2	4 January 1985	29 March 1985	13
3	5 January 1987	15 July 1987	28

=== Specials ===
Date	Entitle
18 December 1984	Christmas Special
