= Peter Tomlinson =

British broadcaster

Peter Tomlinson (born 4 April 1943) is a broadcaster and continuity announcer. He created the British children's television series Tiswas and was the programme's co-presenter in its early years.

He was also one of the earliest presenters on Harlech Television. In 2007 he became the High Sheriff of the West Midlands.

== Early broadcasting ==
Born in 1943 in Bristol, he was one of the first announcers on Harlech Television (later HTV).

In the early 1970s, he moved to ATV. Fellow broadcaster Alex Trelinski recalled "he brought some great laughs into his continuity slots. The highlight of the week was on a Friday night when ATV would screen a horror film after News at Ten under the umbrella title of "Appointment with Fear". Everybody would have fun, with the continuity suite lights often being darkened, and Peter Tomlinson would appear clutching a teddy bear.

== Tiswas ==
In 1973, Tomlinson was given the task of linking a number of children shows on ATV on a Saturday morning. To liven things up, in between cartoons, he ad-libbed a competition, offering viewers the chance to win a T-shirt. The response to the competition was enormous and quite unprecedented for the station. This gave Tomlinson the confidence to approach the ATV's management and show them there was an untapped audience out there. The management agreed and Tiswas was born.

Known as the "plummy-voiced" member of the team, he was a regular presenter on the show from 1974 to 1977, when it was still only shown in the Midlands region. He did though make sporadic appearances after that up until 1980, when the show was at the peak of its (almost) national popularity.

== Later broadcasting ==
After leaving ATV in 1979 he joined Beacon Radio in Wolverhampton and the Black Country. He later became managing director and a presenter of Saga Radio's West Midlands station.

During the 1980s he was heard providing the voice-over on Central Independent Television's popular quiz show Blockbusters.

In 2022, Peter Tomlinson joined the presentation team at the online easy listening radio station Serenade Radio, where he presents a weekly programme on Sunday afternoons. He has also hosted a number of special series for the station, including Radio Heroes, which profiled notable British radio presenters such as Alan Dell, Benny Green, David Jacobs, Desmond Carrington, Hubert Gregg, and Jack Jackson, and Those Academy Award Years, focusing on songs nominated for the Academy Award for Best Original Song.

== High Sheriff of the West Midlands ==
At a ceremony in the Queen Elizabeth II Law Courts in Birmingham in April 2007, Tomlinson was named the new High Sheriff of the West Midlands. He said "I feel very honoured to be asked to become the High Sheriff of one of the busiest shrievalties in the country. I am looking forward to serving my country and making a difference where I can."

== Worcestershire County Council ==
Peter Tomlinson was elected as a councillor on 16 August 2016 on Worcestershire County Council after a by-election following the death of the incumbent Maurice Broomfield. He represents the Ombersley Division of the county. At the Annual Meeting of the Council held on 16 May 2019 he was elected Chairman of the county (equivalent to Mayor) and became its first citizen for the year following.
