= David Gell =

Canadian DJ and television presenter (1929–2023)

- Born: 23 August 1929; Canada
- Died: 8 December 2023 (aged 94)
- Occupation(s): Television presenter and radio DJ

David Gell (23 August 1929 – 8 December 2023) was a Canadian radio DJ and television presenter.

Born in Canada, he worked for radio station CFAC in Calgary before relocating to Europe. He was a DJ on Radio Luxembourg, and later on the BBC Light Programme, Radio One, and Radio Two.

Gell presented many popular programmes for the BBC, including the Top Ten Game produced by Johnny Beerling, a midweek show which toured the country inviting audiences of 200 to vote for their favourite discs of the week from 1965. Each week David would play ten new releases, followed by the ten most popular songs from the previous week, together with a Second Chance Disc, which had previously been played but did not register enough votes to make the Top Ten. The show ran until it was dropped in early 1966.

From 16 June 1958, he hosted the twice-weekly Granada Television quiz show Concentration which usually came from the Manchester studios but would sometimes go to other cities, such as Glasgow. In 1969 and 1970, Gell was the commentator for the United Kingdom in the Eurovision Song Contest; he had previously provided the BBC Radio commentary for the 1965 contest.

Gell later presented another 'voting' show for the BBC on Radio Two, namely European Pop Jury, where teenagers from several European countries would sit in judgement of two songs from each participating nation. The programme aired monthly and would typically feature the UK, Ireland, Germany, Spain, Norway, Sweden and Finland.

David had a toned down mid-Atlantic accent, and a warm, professional style, with strong audience rapport. Gell left EPJ and the BBC after his broadcast on 23 July 1977.

By 1978 David Gell had returned to broadcasting in his native Canada where he remained until retiring in the 2000s.

Gell was involved with his daughter Rosemary. C. Gell's company Golden Muse Productions, which specialises in musical theatre. He died at his home on 8 December 2023, at the age of 94. He is survived by his wife and two daughters.
