= Trevor East =

British TV presenter (born 1950)

Trevor James East (born 22 October 1950) is a British TV presenter. He was originally presenter of Tiswas; stooge to Chris Tarrant and Derby County obsessed. He was subsequently ranked 27 in The Guardian's "Media 100" most influential people in the industry.

== Early life ==
He went to Bemrose Grammar School in Derby, a boys' grammar school.

== Presenter ==
He began his television career as an ATV sports reporter, having been a disc jockey in Derby's clubs in the mid-1960s.

Series 2 of Tiswas began from late 1974, and spanned almost every Saturday in 1975, finishing in early 1976. The presenting team was doubled to four presenters, mostly culled from ATV's presentation department. Chris Tarrant and John Asher were joined by Peter Tomlinson and Trevor East. Trevor had a memorable ventriloquist spot at The Royal Variety Performance as a Zoo Keeper, presenting the Venezuelan Jungle Parrot who sang the song Nellie Dean whilst Trevor attempted to drink Beer.

== Management ==
By October 1983, East was ITV's executive producer for Snooker. He failed, in negotiations with the WPBSA, to wrestle coverage of the World Snooker Championship from the BBC.

By 1992, as head of ITV football broadcasting, East fought against Sky Sports initial foray into football coverage. But he eventually became an integral part of the team that built Sky Sports' dominance of live top-flight football. and was later director of sport at Setanta Sports).

== Personal life ==
He is the father of the television presenter Jamie East.
