= Cool It (TV series) =

BBC TV comedy series starring British comedian Phil Cool

- Genre: Comedy, impressionism
- Created by: Phil Cool; Jasper Carrott; Paul Alexander; Keith Donnelly; Barry Faulkner
- Directed by: David Weir
- Starring: Phil Cool
- Country of origin: United Kingdom
- Original language: English
- No. of series: 3
- No. of episodes: 15

Production
- Producer: Steve Weddle
- Running time: 25–30 minutes

Original release
- Network: BBC Two
- Release: 30 August 1985 – 18 December 1990

Cool It is a British television comedy series which first aired on BBC Two between 30 August 1985 and 18 December 1990. It was a vehicle for comedian Phil Cool.

Impressions ranged from political and important figures such as Robin Day, Roy Hattersly, Arthur Scargill, Neil Kinnock, Pope John Paul II and Ronald Reagan to popular celebrities, comedians and musicians such as Mick Jagger, Bryan Ferry, Mike Harding, Terry Wogan, Billy Connolly, Clive James, Rik Mayall and Rolf Harris. Fictional characters like Quasimodo, Bugs Bunny and E.T were also impersonated and even inanimate objects such as Morris Minors and Volkswagen Beetles.

== Series 1 ==
The first series of three, 25-minute episodes were first broadcast between 30 August and 13 September 1985, on Fridays at 10pm. Cool wrote all of the material for this series himself, it was made on a shoestring budget with few props, a basic set and a small audience. Jasper Carrott was associate producer on this series.

Highlights included; impersonating the entire cast of The Young Ones including Alexei Sayle, Prince Charles interviewing Mick Jagger, the Pope ordering fish and chips, Rolf Harris painting the Sistine Chapel ceiling, Mike Harding singing the song "Spewie, Ewie" and Quasimodo singing "The Bellringer's Blues".

Each series of Cool It had a different set of opening titles, for Series 1 it had an animated version of Cool's head pulling various faces behind a light-blue background.

== Series 2 ==
The title card for Series 2 of Cool It in 1986.

The second series of five, 30-minute episodes were first broadcast between 24 November and 22 December 1986, on Mondays at 9pm. Cool co-wrote this series with Jasper Carrott and it later won the Royal Television Society Award for "Most Original Television Achievement".

Series 2 featured a bigger set with a bigger audience, there were more props and a few pre-recorded video inserts. To tie in with the show, Cool released a comedy album through Virgin Records called "Not Just a Pretty Face" and a single in which Cool (as Rolf Harris) sang a rendition of the Simon and Garfunkel song "Bridge Over Troubled Water". A tie-in book was also released entitled Cool's Out.

Highlights included Rolf Harris (literally) painting the audience, an anecdote in which Cool reminisced about the time he imitated the face of an Aquaphibian from Stingray and it stuck and portraying Terry Wogan as an intergalactic alien from outer space.

The opening titles for Series 2 featured five animated versions of Cool jumping Up and down to harmonica music. After that there was a long shot of Cool's head pulling a selection of funny faces while slowly spinning all the way round. His head then exploded revealing a variety of mechanical works and cogs inside, the lights ẅent out and the Cool It logo appeared on screen.

== Series 3 ==
The title card for Series 3 in 1988.

The third series of six, 30-minute episodes were first broadcast between 1 September and 6 October 1988, on Thursdays at 9 pm. Along with Cool, this time around the writers consisted of Keith Donnelly, Paul Alexander and Barry Faulkner.

Highlights included impressions of ventriloquists' dummies, a parody of the Four Tops called "The Four Bottom's" performing the song "Mooning" and singing the Elvis Presley song "Are You Lonesome Tonight" in Japanese.

The opening titles for Series 3 started with Cool relaxing on a chair watching television and then for no apparent reason the Series 2 titles appear on screen. Cool uses the remote control to change channels but it appears on screen again, he gets increasingly frustrated and starts pulling faces. He then presses a red button at the top of the remote which operates a huge swinging ball that smashes the TV screen.

== Christmas special ==
A final Cool It special was aired on Tuesday 18 December 1990. Filmed in front of a live audience in Birmingham, it included impersonations of the Gremlins, Terry Wogan interviewing Michael Crawford and a routine about the hazards of the M25 Motorway.

Cool then made the move to ITV with the shows Cool Head (1991) and the self-titled Phil Cool (1992).

== VHS releases ==
The front cover for the video release of Cool It in 1985.

There were two VHS releases of Cool It, the first one was a best-of compilation of Series 1 released in 1985, the second entitled Cool It Too contained the best moments from Series 2. Cool It has not yet been released on DVD, but videos from the show have been uploaded to YouTube.
