= John Gorman (entertainer) =

English comedian, vocalist and comedy musician (born 1936)

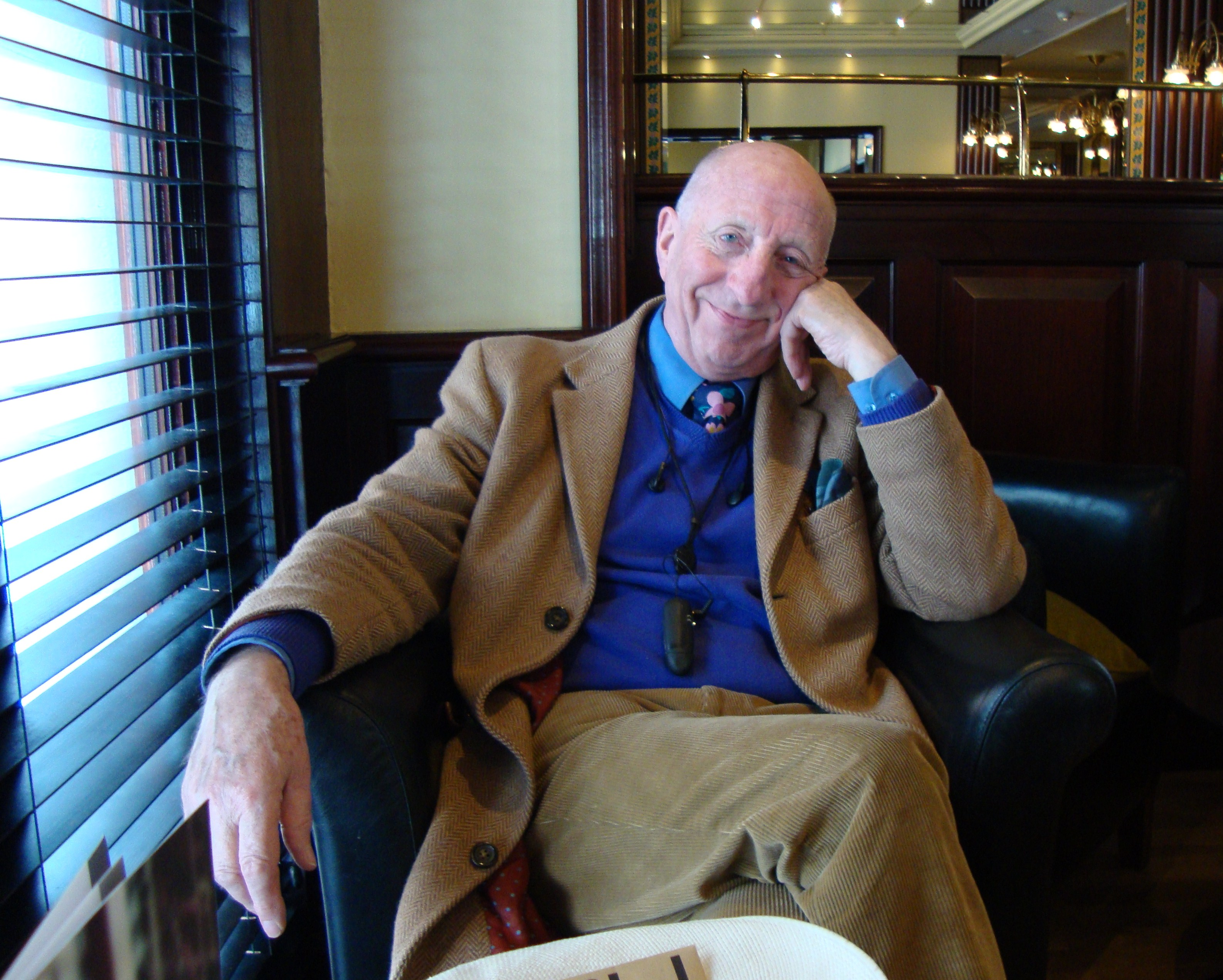
- John Gorman in 2010
- Born: 4 January 1936 (age 90); Birkenhead, England
- Occupations: Comedian; musician
- Years active: 1960s–present
- Notable work: The Scaffold; Tiswas

John Gorman (born 4 January 1936) is an English comedian, vocalist and comedy musician. He is best known for being a member of the trio The Scaffold with Mike McCartney and Roger McGough, and for being a host on the children's show Tiswas from 1978 to 1981.

== Early life and education ==
Gorman was born in Birkenhead, Cheshire, in 1936. After grammar school, Gorman worked as a telecommunications engineer for the GPO and did national service in the Royal Air Force.

== Career ==
Gorman was the founder of the comedy music group The Scaffold, with Mike McGear (now McCartney) and Roger McGough. They are best known for their records, "Thank U Very Much" (1967) and their 1968 hit single "Lily the Pink", which was Christmas number one of that year. The Scaffold disbanded in 1977 but all three members would form the successor, the band GRIMMS, formed at the suggestion of Gorman. The 'G' in Gorman providing the 'G' in GRIMMS name (Gorman, Roberts, Innes, McGear, McGough, Stanshall).

During the 1970s he made brief film appearances in Frankie Howerd's medieval set farce Up the Chastity Belt (1971), Melody (1971), Terry Gilliam's Jabberwocky (1977), where he is credited as 'second peasant', and The Music Machine (1979) as a newsagent. In the early 1970s, Gorman created his "P.C. Plod" character and from 1972—1973 he released two novelty singles with Island Records. A short film was made starring Gorman as P.C. Plod in 1972 and the character was revived on Tiswas. He also made a comedy musical album for DJM Records, Go Man Gorman in 1977.

He also made appearances on the British children's television show Tiswas between 1977 until the shows end in 1981 (becoming a regular member in 1978). Gorman, with Tiswas presenters Chris Tarrant, Sally James and Bob Carolgees, was one of the Four Bucketeers, a novelty band whose highest-charting single was "Bucket of Water Song", which reached No. 26 in the UK Singles Chart in 1980. The Bucket of Water song was originally a sketch made by Gorman for the show.

After Tiswas stopped broadcasting in 1981, Gorman worked with Chris Tarrant on its adult-oriented successor O.T.T.. He then moved to Tyne Tees, and was a co-host on the children's game show How Dare You! from 1984 to 1987 and later appeared as a guest on another children's show, Razzmatazz in 1986.

After a period living in France, he returned as artistic director for the Theatre on the Steps in Bridgnorth, Shropshire, England. He appeared on a 1997 episode of This Is Your Life dedicated to Chris Tarrant and in 2001 was a member of the identity parade on an episode of Never Mind the Buzzcocks. He appeared on the Tiswas Reunited show on ITV1 on 16 June 2007. Also in 2007 he announced plans to establish a Wirral Academy of the Arts at Birkenhead Park and in addition performed his two-hour one man show at the Liverpool Academy of Arts, about his career in show business.

Gorman is involved in many events celebrating visual arts and literary that take place in The Wirral and Liverpool. Throughout the 2020s, the Scaffold have performed on and off again reunion shows, which was suggested by Gorman according to McCartney. On 16 April 2022, Gorman reunited once again with Bob Carolgees, Sally James and Chris Tarrant for a Tiswas reunion show at St George's in Bristol as part of the city's annual Slapstick Festival.

== Personal life ==
Gorman has three children from his first marriage and four grandchildren. One of his children has passed away. He met his second wife, Sue, in France and later moved with her back to the UK, to Shropshire. They moved to The Wirral in 2008 and have lived there since.

Gorman moved to France in 1992 and lived on a six-acre farm for six years, and focused on writing.

== Discography ==
Solo albums

- 1977: Go Man Gorman — DJM Records

Solo singles

- 1972: "W.P.C. Plod / B Side Yourself With Plod" — Island Records (released as "P.C. Plod)
- 1973: "W.P.C. Hodges / I Remember" — Island Records (released as "P.C. Plod)
- 1977: "Whole World In His Band / Po-etry Rock" — DJM Records

Other appearances

- The Scaffold — The Scaffold — Parlophone Records — 1968
- L. the P. — The Scaffold — Parlophone Records — 1969
- Grimms — GRIMMS — Island Records — 1973
- Rockin' Duck — GRIMMS — Island Records — 1973
- Fresh Liver — The Scaffold — Island Records — 1973
- Sold Out — The Scaffold — Warner Records — 1975
- Sleepers — GRIMMS — DJM Records — 1976
- Recycled — Prophet — 1991

== Filmography ==
=== Film ===
- 1971: Melody — Boys Brigade Captain
- 1971: Up the Chastity Belt — 1st Man-at-arms
- 1972: Plod — P.C. Plod
- 1977: Jabberwocky — 2nd Peasant
- 1979: The Music Machine — Newsagent
- 2010: Dear Mr. Hicks — short film — himself

=== Television ===
- 1967—1980: Top of the Pops — himself — eleven episodes (with The Scaffold 1967—1974, with Four Bucketeers 1980)
- 1969: The Talk of the Town — himself — one episode
- 1969: The Mike Douglas Show — himself — one episode
- 1970—1971: Score with the Scaffold — himself — seven episodes
- 1972: He Said, She Said — himself — one episode
- 1973: Full House — himself — one episode
- 1973: Up Sunday — himself — one episode
- 1975: The London Weekend Show — himself — one episode
- 1976: Camera and the Song — himself — one episode (with GRIMMS)
- 1978—1981: Tiswas — himself — twenty-five episodes
- 1979: Not the Nine O'Clock News — various roles — two episodes
- 1981: The Children's Royal Variety Show — himself — one episode
- 1982: O.T.T. — himself — twelve episodes
- 1982—1987: Hold Tight! — himself — ? episodes
- 1984—1987: How Dare You! — himself — ? episodes
- 1984: Names and Games — himself — one episode
- 1986: Razzmatazz — himself — one episode
- 1997: This Is Your Life — himself — one episode (Chris Tarrant special)
- 2000: 100 Greatest TV Moments From Hell — himself — one episode
- 2000: Stars and Their Lives — himself — one episode
- 2001: Never Mind the Buzzcocks — himself — one episode
- 2007: Tiswas Reunited — himself — one episode
- 2009: The One Show — himself — one episode

== See also ==
- Liverpool poets
