= Sally James (presenter) =

British actress and TV presenter (born 1950)

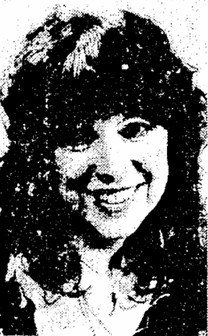
- James in 1982
- Born: Sally Cann; 10 May 1950 (age 76); Chiswick, London, England
- Occupations: Actress; television presenter; radio broadcaster
- Television: Saturday Scene; Tiswas
- Spouse: Mike Smith
- Children: 3

Sally James (born Sally Cann, 10 May 1950) is a British television presenter. She presented the ITV Saturday morning children's show Tiswas from 1977 until it ended in 1982. James's role on the show included conducting the "Almost Legendary Pop Interviews", interviewing musical acts including Elvis Costello, Sting, The Clash, Motörhead, Iron Maiden and Kate Bush, and serving as music editor.

Before joining Tiswas, James was an actress, appearing in the films To Sir, with Love (1967), Journey to the Unknown (1969), The Railway Children (1970), and Never Too Young to Rock (1975). Her television roles included parts in Castle Haven (1969), Cousin Bette (1971), and The Black Arrow (1973–74). She was a presenter on Saturday Scene (later titled Supersonic Saturday Scene), starting in 1974, and interviewed pop stars in a segment of the show. James was a member of the Four Bucketeers group, whose single "Bucket Of Water Song" reached No. 26 in the UK Singles Chart in 1980. Her book Sally James' Almost Legendary Pop Interviews was published in 1981.

In 1981, she co-presented the nightly Six Fifty-five Special with David Soul on BBC2. After Tiswas ended , James presented Ultra Quiz (1983). She now runs a business selling school uniforms.

== Early life and career ==
Sally James was born in Chiswick on 10 May 1950, the daughter of Olive and Bob Cann. Bob Cann was a photographer, who later worked as the official photographer for the films Dr. No and A Hard Day's Night. James attended the Arts Educational Schools. She appeared as one of Sidney Poitier's pupils in To Sir, with Love (1967), credited as Sally Cann, after her father, who was working on the film, spoke to the director and got her the part. She subsequently used her father's middle name, James, in her stage name.

She appeared in Castle Haven (1969), a twice-weekly serial for Yorkshire Television, playing Jo Mercer, a woman newly married to a teacher. In the series, the couple are tenants of one of the flats in a pair of converted houses and are struggling financially. James Towler in The Stage reviewed the programme including the comment "more performances of the quality of Sally James would undoubtedly enhance the future of the series." She played the role of a "dolly bird" in the comedy Turnbull's Finest Half-Hour (1972), which was set in a fictional television station, and was one of the cast praised for their performances in Towler's review in The Stage.

Her television roles included parts in Paul Temple, Sanctuary, Dixon of Dock Green, Curry & Chips, Journey to the Unknown, Cousin Bette, The Two Ronnies, and The Black Arrow. Film roles included The Railway Children (1970) as a maid, and in the glam rock film Never Too Young to Rock (1975).

== Presenting career ==
James began presenting in 1973, for Saturday Scene, during which she interviewed pop stars, including David Essex and The Bay City Rollers in a quarter-hour long section of the show. The show was later renamed Supersonic Saturday Scene, and broadcast at different times in different ITV regions, including as a Saturday morning show in London. An album, Saturday Scene, that included both interviews and songs performed by James, was released in 1974. The review in The Stage called James "an ebullient personality in sound as well as vision", adding that "disc, screen or stage she's got the potential to adorn all of them." Paul Brookman of The Thanet Times thought that although the programme was popular, the album would have limited appeal as the interviews would soon be outdated, and "after hearing the album a few times it has nothing to offer."

In October 1976, the BBC started devoting a three-hour slot on BBC1 on Saturday mornings to a new show, Multi-Coloured Swap Shop, which The Stage noted put the new programme "in direct competition with ITV's Saturday Scene presented by Sally James." By July 1977, Multi-Coloured Swap Shop attracted six million weekly viewers nationally, whilst Saturday Scene, which was not broadcast across all ITV regions, had three million viewers in London. Meanwhile, ATV had produced the Saturday morning children's show Tiswas since 1974, which was shown only in the ATV region until also being screened by HTV from 1976. It was announced that James and Jim Davidson would be joining the show, alongside existing hosts Chris Tarrant and Trevor East, for the series starting on 10 September 1977, and that the programme would be broadcast in three additional ITV regions. The following year, Tiswas was reduced from three to two hours' duration, with Tarrant becoming the producer, as well as being a main host beside James, and East taking a reduced role.

James's role on the show included conducting the "Almost Legendary Pop Interviews", interviewing many famous musical acts including Elvis Costello, Sting, The Clash, Motörhead, and The Pretenders. James remained as a presenter until the show ended in 1982. She was also music editor for the show. James was a member of the group the Four Bucketeers, alongside other Tiswas cast members Tarrant, John Gorman and Bob Carolgees. The group released the single "Bucket Of Water Song", which reached No. 26 in the UK Singles Chart in 1980, and they undertook a national concert tour.

A collection of her interviews, titled Sally James Almost Legendary Pop Interviews, was published as a book in 1981. It included interviews with Kate Bush, Motörhead, Adam Ant, Bad Manners, Roger Daltrey and Kim Wilde among others. Several of the interviewee pictures used in the book were taken by her father, Bert Cann. Paul Taylor's Popular music since 1955 : a critical guide to the literature (1985) says that "The quality varies widely from serious dialogues to those in which the interviewer is not being taken at all seriously."

Marion McMullen of the Coventry Evening Telegraph wrote in 2003 that "Tiswas turned [James] into a cult favourite and 21 years later she is still remembered as the woman who first brought sex appeal to children's telly." A piece in The Times in 1998 said "Kids at home adored the chaos ... while their dads admired the denim-clad charms of Sally James."; for The Guardian in 2007, Bibi van der Zee commented that James "was openly touted as, er, getting dads up in the morning". In 1981, she co-presented the nightly Six Fifty-five Special with David Soul on BBC2.

James was one of the presenters of the first series of the TVS show Ultra Quiz (1983), alongside Michael Aspel and Jonathan King. The programme, a version of the Japanese game show Trans America Ultra Quiz, started with 2,000 contestants, who were reduced to a final pair, by eliminating participants who answered questions wrongly, taking place at a variety of locations. The winner's prize was £10,000, a large amount for a British quiz show at the time. TVS controller Michael Blakstad described the show as "quite awful", and it was revamped for the following season with a new presenting team.

In the 1984-85 pantomime season, James appeared in the title role in Aladdin at the Towngate Theatre, Poole, whilst pregnant. In The Stage, Stan Sowden wrote that James "establishe[d] a quick rapport with the audience, particularly the younger members." After a career break, James appeared on Back to the Drawing Board in 1986 and guested on Countdown for a week in 1987.

== Later career ==
Some 25 years after Tiswas ended, James presented a reunion show Tiswas Reunited alongside Tarrant on ITV on 16 June 2007. Lasting 90 minutes, the show featured contributions from celebrities who enjoyed the show as children and appearances by people who had been on the show. In 2010 she had a programme on BBC Radio WM.

James appeared on stage in Harpenden for Christmas 2013 as Fairy in the pantomime Jack and the Beanstalk, around 30 years after her previous pantomime appearance. In 1992 she started a business called Unismart, based in Surrey and selling school uniforms, which she still ran in 2016. As of 2026 she is still listed (as Sally Smith) as a director of the company.

== Personal life ==
She is married to agent and entrepreneur Mike Smith. They have three sons, including Sky Sports presenter Adam Smith. She lives in Surrey (as of 2016).

== Filmography ==
Year	Title	Role	Notes
1967	To Sir, with Love	Schoolgirl	
1968	Half a Sixpence		
1970	The Railway Children	Maid	
1975	Never Too Young to Rock	Herself	

== Television ==
Year	Title	Role	Notes	Ref(s)
1967	Z-Cars	Girl in Cafe	Episode: "Ever Seen a Happy Cop? Part One"	
1967	Mickey Dunne			
1967-1968	Sanctuary			
1968	Armchair Theatre	Susan	Episode "The Three Wives of Felix Hull"	
1968	Dixon of Dock Green	Sally Cooper	Episode: "The Hard Way"	
1969	Curry and Chips	Secretary	1 episode	
1969	Castle Haven	Jo Mercer	TV series	
1969	Journey to the Unknown	Peggy	Episode "The Last Visitor"	
1969	Journey to the Unknown	Peggy	Compilation film	
1970	The Wind Blew Her Away	Joyce		
1970	Menace	Jane	Episode "The Elimination"	
1971	Death Sentence	Jean		
1971	Cousin Bette	Marie	Parts 2 to 5	
1971	Paul Temple	Jean	Episode: "Death Sentence"	
1971	Father, Dear Father	Felicity	Episode An Affair to Forget	
1972	The Two Ronnies	on-screen participant		
1972	Christmas Night with the Stars	shop assistant (The Two Ronnies)		
1972	Turnbull's Finest Half Hour	dolly bird		
1972	Harriet's Back in Town	Eileen	2 episodes	
1972	Crown Court	Miss Foster	Episode: "A Genia Man"	
1972-1974	The Two Ronnies	Various	6 episodes	
1973	Sixes and Sevens	Millie		
1973	Arthur of the Britons	Lenni	2 episodes	
1973	A Funny Kind of Day	Kate		
1973–1974	The Black Arrow	Megs	6 episodes	
1973–1974	Saturday Scene	presenter		
1974	Rosie all the Way	Millie		
1974	London Bridge	presenter (3 episodes)		
1974	Lift Off with Ayshea	guest		
1975-1977	Pop Quest	Panellist, Presenter		
1976	Supersonic (Saturday Scene Inserts 1977)	cast member		
1977	Sally James, Peter Gabriel, Mack and Katie Kissoon			
1977–1982	Tiswas	presenter		
1980-1981	Give Us a Clue	on-screen participant	2 episodes	
1981	The Children's Royal Variety Performance	on-screen participant		
1981–1984	Punchlines	on-screen participant	9 episodes	
1981-1985	Blankety Blank	on-screen participant	3 episodes	
1981–1990	The Pyramid Game	on-screen participant	8 episodes	
1981	About Books	presenter		
1982	Square One	on-screen participant (2 episodes)		
1982–1983	Six Fifty-five Special	presenter		
1983	Show Business	cast member		
1983	Ultra Quiz	presenter		
1983	Show Business (Pilot)	presenter		
1984	On Safari	on-screen participant		
1986	Back to the Drawing Board	presenter		
1987	Countdown	cast member		
1990	You Bet!	on-screen participant		
1991	The Grand Final	on-screen participant		
1992	Video View	on-screen participant		
2000	Collectors' Lot	presenter		
2001	The Grimley Curse	herself		
2002	After They Were Famous	on-screen participant		
2004	Banzai	on-screen participant		
2007	Have I Been Here Before?	on-screen participant		
2007	TISWAS Reunited	on-screen participant		

Pantomime

Year	Title	Role	Venue	Ref
1975–76	Aladdin		New Victoria Theatre, London	
1983–84	Aladdin	Aladdin	Towngate Theatre, Poole	
1985–86	Dick Whittington	Dick Whittington	Princes Hall, Aldershot	
2013–14	Jack and the Beanstalk	Fairy	Harpenden Public Halls	

== Discography ==
Sally James discography
Year	Title	Format	Notes	Ref(s)
1974	"Isn't It Good" / "Wake Me When It's Over"	Single	Vocalist. Philips Records 6006 418	
1976	"Copycat" / "(Help Me By) Loving Me Baby"	Single	Vocalist. DJM Records DJS 10721	
1980	"The Bucket Of Water Song"	Single	Vocalist (as part of The Four Bucketeers) CBS: 8393	
