= ITV Central =

Independent Television franchisee for the Midlands

- Logo used since 2013

- Type: Region of television network
- Branding: ITV1
- Country: United Kingdom
- First air date: 1 January 1982; 44 years ago
- Founded: 14 April 1980; 46 years ago by Lew Grade (founder of ATV)
- Motto: "The One to Watch"; "Even More"; "The Shape of Television"; "Central is ITV"; "Central Just the ticket"
- TV transmitters: Sutton Coldfield, Waltham, Ridge Hill, The Wrekin (formerly Oxford, Lichfield, Membury)
- Headquarters: Birmingham, West Midlands
- Broadcast area: The Midlands and parts of the South West
- Nation: England
- Owner: ITV plc
- Dissolved: lost on-air identity on 27 October 2002 (now known as ITV1 at all times)
- Former names: Central Independent Television; Carlton Central; ITV1 Carlton for Central England; ITV1 for Central England
- Picture format: 1080i HDTV, downscaled to 16:9 576i for SDTV
- Affiliation: ITV
- Official website: itv.com/central
- Replaced: ATV

ITV Central, previously known as Central Independent Television, Central ITV, Carlton Central, ITV1 for Central England and commonly referred to as simply Central, is the Independent Television franchisee in the English Midlands. It was created following the restructuring of ATV, and it officially began broadcasting on 1 January 1982. The service is owned and operated by ITV plc under the licensee of ITV Broadcasting Limited. Historically Central made a major contribution to the ITV network schedule – especially in entertainment and drama – but today its main responsibility is the regional news service.

== History ==
=== Background ===
During the 1970s ATV, the previous Midlands licence holder, was often criticised for its lack of regional output and character. Although ATV had purpose-built a modern colour production complex in the centre of Birmingham, most of its major productions were recorded at its main studios at Elstree in Hertfordshire, a legacy of the period when the company also held the London Weekend franchise until 1968, when it was awarded to LWT. Its corporate headquarters were in Central London.

ATV attempted to address its problem in 1980 as part of its franchise reapplication; with plans for a second major facility in the area (to be based in Nottingham) and as part of the Independent Broadcasting Authority's plan for the contract to provide separate news coverage for both the East Midlands and the West Midlands. The company name would also be changed from ATV Network Limited to ATV Midlands Limited, thus reinforcing the greater regional focus. The IBA accepted ATV's assertion that ATV Midlands Ltd planned to take a more local identity and awarded the contract to ATV Midlands Ltd on the basis that further changes were to be implemented, including that the parent company, Associated Communications Corporation, would divest 49 percent of its shareholding in ATV Midlands Ltd in an attempt to introduce local shareholders and that ATV Midlands Ltd's registered office should be within the region. To demonstrate this change of share structure the IBA insisted that ATV change its company name, to show that it was a substantially new company due to the requirement for a dual region.

=== Launch ===
The station began transmitting at 9:25 am on Friday 1 January 1982 with an authority announcement by duty announcer Su Evans, followed by an extended five-minute promo entitled Welcome to Central, voiced by Peter Wheeler, previewing the company's network and regional programming, and the schedule for the first day of transmission.

Central initially ran a sole pan-regional service from Birmingham, as a result of an industrial dispute which prevented its East Midlands service from Nottingham commencing before September 1983. The split allowed Central to serve the West Midlands with its own service from Birmingham. There were few differences between the East and West sub-regions, but each had its own news service, advertisements, and during the early years of operation, continuity. This would lead to the BBC launching its own sub-regional service for the East Midlands during the 1980s, which became a region in its own right in January 1991, with the launch of BBC East Midlands Today.

=== Operations ===
By March 1984, the reorganisation of the company was complete, allowing pre-tax profits to double from £3.5 million to £6.5 million in its first two financial years. Shortly afterward, Zenith Productions was established as a subsidiary of Central Television, which produced programming for the UK and the USA – most famously including the company's television adaptations of the Inspector Morse novels. The formation of Zenith Productions on 3 April 1984 allowed the company to exploit markets outside of the US and UK, similarly to how Thames operated its Euston Films subsidiary. Central's interests in onscreen fiction saw the company buy the Korda Film Library in 1986.

In January 1987, Central acquired the European division of the American production company FilmFair for £1.5million, which went on to produce several of the station's networked children's series before being sold onto the Storm Group (Caspian) in 1991. On the same day, Central bought a stake in Starstream, who co-founded and operated The Children's Channel – the 22% stake was sold in November 1991 to United Artists Cable International (formerly a subsidiary of United Artists Theatres, the parent company now a division of Regal Entertainment Group, and the former cable company merged into TCI, the predecessor of Liberty Media). A few months later, Central became the first ITV station to broadcast its own overnight service, including short news bulletins, imported output and the long-running Jobfinder service – launched in 1986 in partnership with the Manpower Services Commission – which went on to run for 17 years and won a Royal Television Society award. Central was also awarded the Queen's Award to Industry for Export twice, for selling its range of programming to over 80 countries around the world, in April 1987 and April 1989.

Under its growing business portfolio, Central created CTE (Central Television Enterprises) in December 1987 and opened international bureaux in Hamburg, New York City and Sydney for sales, sponsorship and newsgathering operations. CTE, the company's key international distributor of programming, would later represent output sales for Carlton Communications (for its television channel programme-HTV, Meridian and Carlton), who took over Central in 1994.

In 1989, the company founded Zodiac Entertainment – an American entertainment firm specialising in the production and distribution of animated cartoons. Central invested $35 million in the company before deciding to discontinue its production business in 1994, leaving Zodiac to become a distributor. Also in 1989, Central established Television Sales and Marketing Services Ltd (TSMS), a joint venture with Anglia Television providing airtime sales and program sponsorships, in part to recover production costs. In March 1994, Anglia acquired Central's stake in the company to take full control with Central moving over to Carlton's sales department.

In March 1990, Central formed a partnership with The Observer newspaper to create Central Observer, making environmental themed films for British Satellite Broadcasting and terrestrial channels, with funding from the charity Television Trust for the Environment.

Central was unopposed in retaining its franchise in 1993, which allowed the company to bid only a token £2,000 a year (just over £5 a day) – though the company stressed the need to cut more jobs to become more cost-efficient, as the company had agreed to pay 11% of their annual advertising revenue on top of their winning bid. The station's workforce was reduced to 1500 by 1990 and then to 900 by the start of 1992 – less than half of the payroll Central had employed in 1987.

Central also profited from the auction after Meridian, a consortium in which Central held a 20% stake, won the franchise to serve the South and South East of England. Post-1993, the company's ITV network presence was further strengthened when it took over commissioning, presentation and compliance responsibility for a number of continuing Thames Television productions, such as Count Duckula, The Tomorrow People, This Is Your Life, Des O'Connor Tonight, Mr. Bean, Minder, Strike It Lucky and Wish You Were Here.

By April 1993, with the added increase of 8.8% in advertising revenues to £250 million and its income from programme sales rising to £83.4 million, Central became the most successful ITV company after the start of the new franchises.

=== Ownership and takeover ===
Although the IBA required 49% of the new station to be owned locally by companies and individuals, the take-up was nowhere near as expected, leaving companies outside the region to buy shares including DC Thomson (15%), Ladbrokes (10%), Pergamon (9%) and British Rail (2%).

Shortly after the station began broadcasting, Australian entrepreneur Robert Holmes à Court – via his Bell Group – started the process of acquiring Associated Communications Corporation (ACC), Central's majority shareholder, but was halted by the IBA, since the law prohibited foreign companies from controlling British television companies. By March, a rival bid from Gerald Ronson's Heron Corporation also entered the race to takeover ACC. In April 1982, ACC was taken-over by Holmes à Court, with the IBA approving the deal in June on condition that ACC's 51 percent stake in Central be put in trust, thus divesting ACC of all voting power until it had reduced its shares in the broadcaster.

By January 1983, 167 staff had bought shares in the station for a £1 each as part of an innovative shareholding scheme to help offload shares to local people in the Central region. In May 1983, ACC finally sold off its stake in Central; Sears Holdings purchased 20%, while Ladbrokes and DC Thomson also increased their stakes to 20% each, and Pergamon took its ownership to 12.5%, with 27.5% being held by single stakeholders.

In March 1987, Carlton Communications acquired 20 percent of Central from Ladbrokes for £30million which finally gave Carlton its first stake in a terrestrial broadcasting company, after a bid to buy Thames Television was blocked by the IBA two years beforehand. In January 1994 Central was bought in its entirety by Carlton for £750 million The new owners later restructured the company further by combining Central's operations into one and moving its Birmingham studios to a smaller complex elsewhere in the city centre. Network programmes were now classed as Carlton UK Productions and around 140 jobs were lost from the downgraded Birmingham operation.

On 6 September 1999, the station was rebranded on-air as Carlton Central, though the registered company name remained Central Independent Television Limited. The new identity, produced by Lambie-Nairn, was also used on Central's sister stations in the London and Carlton Westcountry regions. Only the "Carlton" name was used on air; however, Central's regional news programmes retained the "Central" brand. With the merger of Carlton and Granada on 2 February 2004, the brand became ITV1 Central. It is currently owned by ITV plc and on 29 December 2006, the registered company name was changed from Central Independent Television Ltd to ITV Central Ltd. Like other subsidiaries of ITV plc, ITV Central Ltd subsequently became dormant and was dissolved on 17 March 2026.

=== Incidents ===
On 5 April 2005, it was revealed ITV Central could be fined by regulator Ofcom for broadcasting a pre-recorded late Central News bulletin for the East Midlands. The regulator later permitted ITV to pre-record some regional news bulletins shortly before transmission.

On 15 July 2008, the station was fined £25,000 for contempt of court.

== Studios ==
Initially, Central inherited ATV's Broad Street studios, ATV Centre, which was renamed Central House when the contractor changed its name – they were retained as Central's headquarters, West Midlands studios and transmission facilities until 1997. Upon winning the franchise, Central decided to construct new studios for its East sub-region, based in Lenton Lane, Nottingham – the new complex was to be called 'East Midlands Television centre'. Up until the studios were opened, Central's East Midlands operations were based on an industrial estate at Giltbrook, near Eastwood on the outskirts of Nottingham. A temporary radio link from Giltbrook to the Waltham transmitter via BT Bowman/Sheriff (Nottingham) Telephone Exchange provided the contribution feed into the studio/transmission network. The Nottingham studios were to be staffed by employees originally based at Elstree (in the studio complex that became BBC Elstree), which led to many problems due to the relocation, including industrial action, which resulted in a long delay for the promised separate news service for the East Midlands until September 1983.

The Nottingham studio complex finally opened in January 1984, followed by an official opening by Prince Philip, Duke of Edinburgh, on 2 March 1984. Five years later, Central opened a computerized news centre in Abingdon for the launch of its third sub-region, serving the South Midlands. Central News South was broadcast from the Abingdon studios, supplemented by news bureaux in Aylesbury, Gloucester and Swindon.

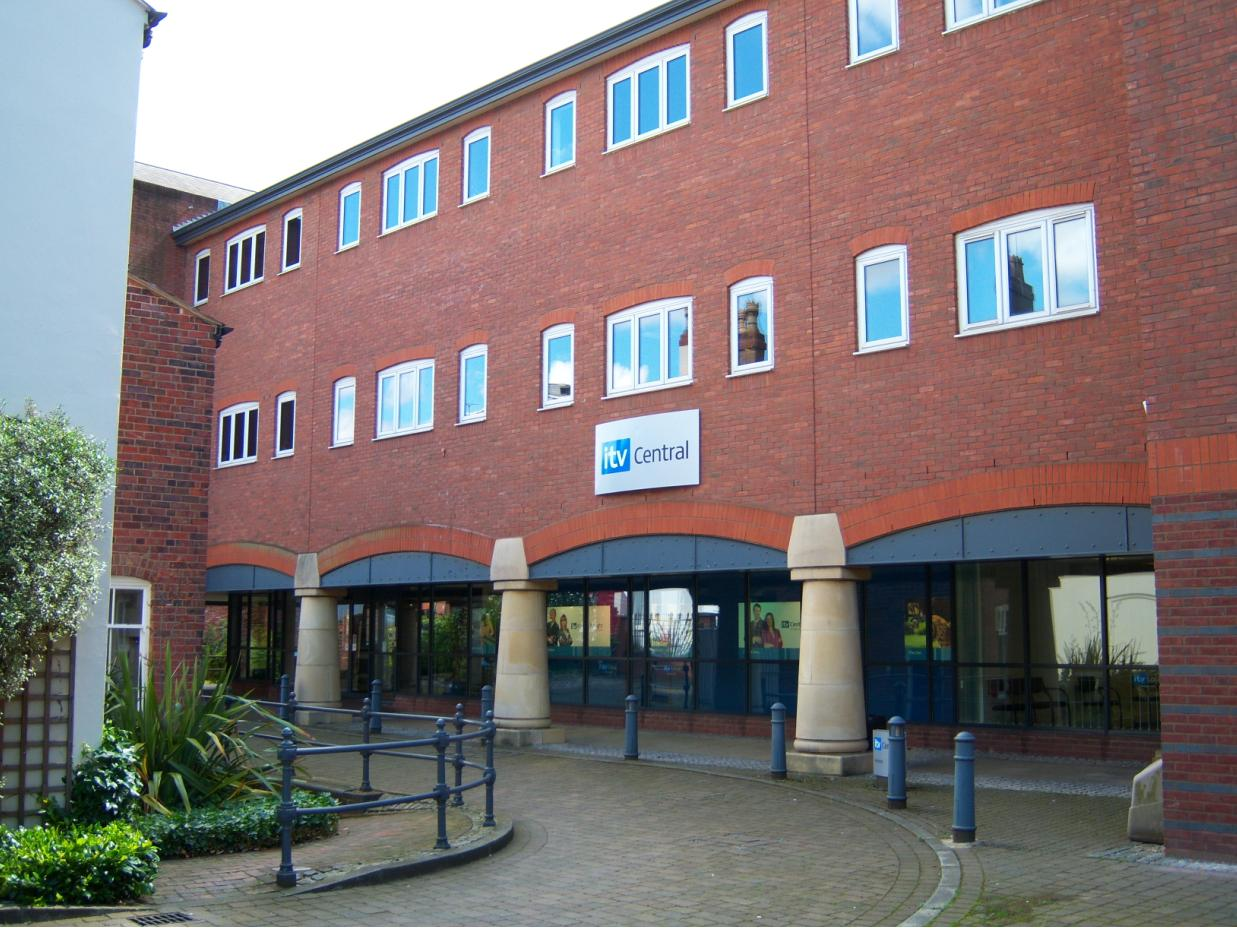
The ITV Central headquarters in Gas Street, Birmingham.

The Broad Street studios in Birmingham – which were rented – came under Central's ownership in November 1991, by which time, its network and large scale programming capability had been transferred to Nottingham, scaling down the Birmingham operation to providing Central News West, regional programming and presentation operations, including those for CITV. In 1994, Central's new owners Carlton acquired land on nearby Gas Street to begin work on building a new, smaller digital studio complex. The new centre was completed in 1997, when Central West's regional news department moved from its Broad Street base, which was eventually demolished during the spring of 2015 to make way for the new 'Arena Central' development." Having been one of the first fully computerised news programmes, Central News South was again a pioneer of new technology when, in the Spring of 2001, state-of-the-art Quantel digital video servers and edit suites were installed, along with a complete re-fit of camera and VTR equipment, placing Central South at the forefront of digital news-gathering in regional news.

In February 2004, ITV plc announced plans to close and sell the Lenton Lane production centre in Nottingham with over 350 jobs being axed in the process Following the closure of the studios, a new news-gathering centre was established in the city, but production and transmission of Central News East moved to the Birmingham studio in Spring 2005. The former studio complex is now part of the University of Nottingham and is known as 'King's Meadow Campus'. It still maintains one Studio (Studio 7), and this is rented out to television and film companies, generating income for the university. In October 2004, ITV plc closed Central's presentation/transmission department and moved transmission to the Northern Transmission Centre in Leeds. Although there was heavy opposition, the role of presentation and transmission at Birmingham had been significantly reduced after network presentation was centralised to LNN in London in 2002 and so there was an inevitability that this function would be moved out. CITV (Children's ITV), which had been presented by Central since 1983, was also re-homed to Granada's studios in Manchester, with all content pre-recorded and with out-of vision presentation.

A documentary about the Broad Street studios was later released on DVD in October 2011. Entitled 'From ATVLand in Colour' (referring to the nickname used on Tiswas, and the building being purpose-built by ATV for colour broadcasting), the documentary featured presenters, actors, announcers and behind-the-scenes staff talking about their time working in the studios, and the programmes that were made there by Central, and predecessor ATV. The five-part documentary, produced by ATVLAND Productions, was followed up in November 2012 by From Headlines to Tight Lines, a DVD on the history of the regional news magazine programme ATV Today.

ITV have since also sold the Gas Street office building to Cube Real Estate, a commercial property developer, which has refurbished the interior of the building. While Central maintains office space and a single ground floor studio, the other studio and floors are available to rent as office space. The property is marketed as '22 Gas Street'.

== Sub-regions ==
Central currently operates two sub-regions:

- Central West serving City of Birmingham, West Midlands, Staffordshire, Warwickshire, Shropshire, Worcestershire, Herefordshire and parts of Gloucestershire.
- Central East serving Nottinghamshire, Derbyshire, Leicestershire, Rutland and parts of Lincolnshire, Cambridgeshire and Northamptonshire - broadcast from Birmingham with a newsgathering centre based in Nottingham.

Initially, as a result of a long-running industrial dispute, Central broadcast a single pan-regional news service from Birmingham. The East Midlands service of news, local advertisements and presentation was launched in September 1983, leaving the Birmingham-based service to adopt its focus on the rest of the region. In January 1989, Central launched a third sub-region for the South Midlands (the Oxford and Ridge Hill transmitters previously served by Central West), carrying its own news service and local advertisements.

The Central South region was disbanded in December 2006 after 17 years in operation – with the eastern half of the area merging with Meridian's North region to form an ITV Thames Valley region. At the same time, ITV West's broadcast footprint was expanded to cover North Gloucestershire from the West's Bristol studios, while Herefordshire and Ludlow re-joined Central News West from Birmingham. While all Thames Valley news programmes were broadcast from Meridian's studios in Whiteley in Hampshire, Central's former Abingdon base was retained as a newsgathering centre.

Further changes in February 2009 saw the end of wholly separate programmes for Central's East and West sub-regions. The pan-regional service included a short six-minute opt out within the 6 pm programme and separate late night bulletins for the two areas. In the former Central South area, ITV's Thames Valley operations were fully merged with those in Meridian's South sub-region and its former territory – including Oxfordshire, Swindon and Buckinghamshire – was formally transferred to the Meridian region when the regional licence was renewed in 2014.

On 23 July 2013, proposals for a more localised Channel 3 news service were approved by Ofcom – ITV News Central extended the East and West opt-out services from six minutes to twenty minutes during the half-hour 6 pm programme, in addition to separate lunchtime and weekend bulletins for the two sub-regions. In the former Thames Valley region, plans were approved for a ten-minute opt out within the 6 pm edition of ITV News Meridian for the south of England.

== Identity ==
The first Central logo, used from 1982 to 1983.

=== Globe: 1982–85 ===
Upon launch, Central's on screen presentation featured a sphere (which resembled a moon or a total eclipse) which would burst open with light, before reforming, accompanied by a light jingle, but was dropped and revised during 1983, so the moon ident would just appear out of darkness with the colour spectrum appearing to its left hand side. This ident was dropped locally in 1985, but remained on the front and end of networked programmes until August 1988.

Although the symbol is well known as the "globe", Russ J Graham of Transdiffusion said the ident passes through several stages that make the viewer wonder "what is it?", before "revealing nothing", noting he thought of it as an egg, but noted it was apparently based on a UFO hovering over the Midlands.

=== Cake: 1985–98 ===
The Central cake logo.

On 25 August 1985 at 9:25am, a new presentation package was launched, which saw the moon redesigned into a three-dimensional shape. It was initially used solely for regional continuity purposes. It did not appear as a pre-programme front ident on network programming from Central, however, it having only been adopted for branding network programmes in April 1988, it began to be used as one of only a few animated end captions in ITV’s history, a few months after pre-programme ITV idents were dropped. The new logo was a circle in shape, but with a curved line running down the left hand side and five horizontal lines dividing the sphere up into twelve segments. The left six segments were coloured red, orange, yellow, green, blue and purple and the whole symbol was computer-animated. The symbol, nicknamed "The Aspirin", or more popularly The Cake, would have a variety of form ups, mainly involved with bringing the segments together or applying the colour to the symbol. The soundtrack was the same composition, but played in a variety of different ways. On 25 April 1987, a new promotional package was introduced with a new slogan Let's Get Together in 1988.

Central also adopted the ITV 1989 generic look as another ident to use alongside the Cake. The generic ident was used in its raw form, along with altered music, and as part of another ident giving greater emphasis to the cake, and was only used into the ITN News. Between 1985 and 1997, well over 10,000 different sequences were made by Central's Presentation team in Birmingham, including break bumpers, idents, "next" animations and trail designs, which give the channel a wider range of presentation than any other British television station. The last batch of Cake idents to be created was introduced on 1 January 1997, in which the cake became more abstract with both more advanced computer graphics used and more live action models & sequences (including a physical neon sign version).

=== Central: 1998–99 ===
From 19 January 1998, the channel started to be called ‘Central ITV’ during continuity announcements, although on screen it was just branded ‘Central’; trailers for programmes were now branded with the 1989 (and later 1998) ITV logo. The cake lasted 13 years before being replaced on 27 April 1998, by adapting a version of the idents that had been used by Carlton since 25 November 1996. This featured the name Central in the font Gill Sans in centre screen against a bright and colourful background. The idents featured a 2D animation of either the letters interacting in some way, a letter being replaced with another object, or the word being part of a larger scene, such as a cross word of place names in the region. The look was retired on 5 September 1999.

=== Carlton: 1999–2002 ===
Central adopted the Carlton 'Star' branding on 6 September 1999, shortly before much of the network adopted the second generic look under the theme of 'Hearts'. The Carlton idents featured an opening film featuring a heart at the end, before a star shaped light came from the heart, engulfing the screen, and showing the endboard, which featured a background of spinning stars in different colours with the brand name centre screen above an ITV logo. The ident itself technically was praised, however the presentational package received complaints and criticisms due to the fact that the Central brand was replaced by the Carlton brand. These idents only featured the Carlton name on screen but the announcements that featured with idents used the name "Carlton for the Central Region" and separate continuity was retained.

=== ITV Central ===
ITV Central logo used from 2006 to 2013.

On 11 August 2001, the ITV1 brand was formed in which replaced the 'ITV' on the Carlton idents. As the ITV1 idents began to be used on their own more and more, and Carlton and Granada owned all the franchises in England and Wales, Carlton and Granada decided to axe regional branding, and replace it with a full-time ITV1 identity. Before regional programmes, the logo 'ITV1 Carlton' was used, until 1 December 2003, when they were known as 'ITV1 for Central England'. The regional idents were gradually phased out, and by 2006, on most days, the only regional branding was for the regional news. In November 2006, the Central name was retired, when regional idents were axed. It would then be known as just ITV1 at all times.

The Carlton brand continued to be seen on production captions until February 2004, with the caption A Carlton Production or A Carlton Production for Central England being used. This was replaced, following the merger of Granada plc and Carlton Communications to form ITV plc, with an ITV regional logo featuring the word Central below the ITV logo with the caption ‘An ITV Production’. Today, the majority of productions have been moved away from the Midlands region, and any productions are accredited to ITV Studios. On 14 January 2013, the station's on-air identity reverted to ITV, along with all other ITV plc-owned franchises.

== Programmes ==
Taking over from ATV as one of the 'Big Five' of ITV companies, Central performed strongly on networked output, carrying on several ATV shows, most notably the soap-opera Crossroads and game shows including Bullseye and Family Fortunes. Original programming included comedy series such as Auf Wiedersehen, Pet (more recently revived by the BBC) and the multi award-winning Spitting Image, drama series Boon and game shows such as The Price is Right and Blockbusters.

Perhaps the station's most successful drama title was its adaptations of the Inspector Morse novels, produced by its subsidiary Zenith Productions. Central also produced the critically acclaimed film Walter – starring Ian McKellen – for Channel 4's first night of transmission. Less successful was one of Central's first networked contributions – the Tiswas spin-off O.T.T., which drew high viewing figures but also heavy criticism for its racy adult content. It was axed after one series and replaced by a low-budget sequel entitled Saturday Stayback. The company also attracted ire with the 1987 sitcom Hardwicke House (starring Roy Kinnear) about an anarchic comprehensive school. The first two episodes received so much public condemnation that the remainder were never transmitted.

Central also formed numerous international partnerships to produce major drama and documentary series – including Legacy of Civilization with Maryland Public Television, Nuclear Age with WGBH-TV (another key PBS affiliate) and NHK and Edens Lost (1989) with ABC.

In the field of news and current affairs, Central had enhanced and bettered on ATV's reputation as a regional news provider by becoming the first British television station to offer three distinct services for different parts of the transmission area. It was also a major contributor to current affairs locally and nationally – from its documentary output such as Viewpoint, 30 Minutes and England Their England to more populist series, including The Cook Report and the long-running debate show Central Weekend, which ran for 15 years in the Midlands on Friday nights. The programme was also the first on British television to examine seriously the AIDS virus, leading to a drama series on the topic, called Intimate Contact. Central also first reported on the Ethiopian famine in July 1984 with the documentary Seeds of Despair. In the same year, the company completed production on one of its more controversial programmes, Question of Leadership, a four-part series directed by Ken Loach about trade unions' responses to government actions. The IBA was concerned it breached balance guidelines, while the unions criticised it as defamatory. Even after several re-edits, the series was never transmitted, which was described as political censorship.

Central also played a major role in the ITV network's infrastructure – not only producing children's and schools programming, but also providing scheduling and presentation services with its dedicated Children's ITV and ITV Schools' strands – the latter moving to Channel 4 in 1987.

With the creation of a dedicated ITV Sport network unit, Central also played a significant part in networked sports output under the leadership of Gary Newbon. The station produced nearly all of ITV's football coverage for over a decade – including the FA Cup, UEFA Champions' League, the FIFA World Cup, the UEFA European Championship and Premier League highlights, as well as extensive live regional coverage of Football League matches involving Midlands clubs in The Central Match. The station also played its part in coverage of key European athletics meetings and world championship boxing with The Big Fight Live as a long-standing Saturday night fixture. In 2004, the department was moved to London and merged with the London News Network's operations to form ITV Sport Productions.

=== Children's ===
- The Adventures of Grady Greenspace (1994–95)
- The Adventures of Portland Bill (1983, co-produced with FilmFair)
- Astro Farm (1992–96, co-produced with FilmFair/David Yates)
- Bangers and Mash (1989, co-produced with FilmFair)
- Bernard's Watch (1997–2005)
- Bill the Minder (1986, co-produced with Bevanfield Films)
- The Blunders (1986, co-produced with FilmFair)
- Count Duckula (1993, co-produced with Cosgrove Hall Films, previously produced by Thames Television)
- Dramarama (1983–89, Contributions)
- The Dreamstone (1990–95, co-produced with FilmFair)
- Emu's World (1982–84)
- Emu's All Live Pink Windmill Show (1984–86)
- Emu's Wide World (1987–88)
- EMU-TV (1989)
- Eye TV (1995–2000)
- Fox Tales (1985, co-produced with Pullover Productions)
- From the Top (1985–86)
- The Gingerbread Man (1992, co-produced with FilmFair/David Yates)
- Grotbags (1991–93)
- Harry's Mad (1993–96)
- Huxley Pig (1989, co-produced with FilmFair)
- The Legends of Treasure Island (1993–95, co-produced with FilmFair)
- Let's Pretend! (1982–88)
- The Little Green Man (1985, co-produced with Pentagon Motion Pictures)
- Luna
- Molly's Gang (1994, co-produced with Martins Gates)
- Moschops (1983, co-produced with FilmFair)
- The Moomins (1983–85, co-produced with FilmFair)
- Murphy's Mob (1982–85)
- Nellie the Elephant (1990, co-produced with 101 Film Productions Limited and Flicks Films)
- Orm and Cheep (1984–87, co-produced with Tony Martin/Orm and Cheep Enterprises Ltd.)
- Out of Sight (1996–98)
- Paddington Bear (1989–90, co-produced with Hanna-Barbera Productions)
- Palace Hill (1988–91)
- Playbox (1987–92, co-produced with Ragdoll Productions)
- The Pondles (1987, co-produced with Chatsworth Television/Pondle Promotion Company)
- Potamus Park (1996–99, co-produced with Zoo Gang Productions)
- Press Gang (1989–93)
- Professor Lobster (1987, co-produced with Mirageland Productions)
- Pullover (1982, co-produced with Pullover Productions/ITC Entertainment)
- The Ratties (1987–88, co-produced with Ratties, Ltd./F-Productions)
- Rocky and the Dodos (1998–99, co-produced with Cosgrove Hall Films)
- Rod 'n' Emu (1991, co-produced with Filmfair)
- Rosie and Jim (1990–2000, co-produced with Ragdoll Productions)
- The Saturday Show (1982–85, renamed The Saturday Starship for the final series)
- Scratchy & Co. (1995–98, co-produced with Mentorn)
- Stanley's Dragon (1994)
- Starting Out (1982–92, previously produced by ATV)
- Star Fleet (1982)
- Tales from Fat Tulip's Garden (1985–87)
- Tales from the Poop Deck (1992, co-produced with Talkback Productions)
- Thomas the Tank Engine and Friends (1984–1986, co-produced with Clearwater Features and Britt Allcroft Ltd)
- Tiswas (1982, previously produced by ATV)
- Tots TV (1993–98, co-produced with Ragdoll Productions)
- Towser (1984; co-produced with King Rollo Films)
- Wail of the Banshee (1992)
- What-a-Mess (1990, co-produced with Bevanfield Films)
- What's Happening? (1982–85)
- Windfalls (1989, co-produced with FilmFair)
- The Winjin' Pom (1991, co-produced with Spitting Image Productions)
- Wolves, Witches and Giants (1995–98, co-produced with Honeycomb Animation)
- Woof! (1989–97)
- Your Mother Wouldn't Like It (1985–88)

=== Drama ===
- Annika (1984)
- Auf Wiedersehen, Pet (1983–86, co-produced with WitzEnd)
- Big Bad World (1999–2001)
- The Blackheath Poisonings (1992)
- Boon (1986–92; 1995)
- The Bretts (1987–88)
- Cadfael (1994–98)
- Chancer (1990–91)
- Coming of Age (1986)
- Coming Through (1985)
- Connie (1985)
- Crossroads (1982–88 & 2001–03, previously produced by ATV)
- A Dangerous Life (1988) co produced with ITC, HBO, Zenith Productions, ABC Australia
- Dangerous Lady (1995)
- Dangerous Women (1992 co-produced with Grundy)
- Drumbeat (1999)
- Edens Lost (1989)
- Faith (1994)
- Family Pride (1991–92)
- The Free Frenchman (1989)
- The Grasscutter (1989)
- The Guilty (1992)
- Hard Cases (1988–89)
- Heart of the High Country (1985)
- Home Front (1983)
- I Remember Nelson (1982, co-produced with ITC Entertainment and RAI (Radiotelevisione Italiana))
- Inspector Morse (1987–2000, co-produced with Zenith)
- Intimate Contact (1987)
- The Jump (1998)
- Kavanagh QC (1995–2001)
- Kennedy (1983)
- A Kind of Alaska (1984)
- The Last Place on Earth (1985)
- Looks and Smiles (1982, co-produced with ITC Entertainment)
- Minder (1993-94, previously produced by Thames Television)
- Muck and Brass (1982)
- Peak Practice (1993–2002)
- Picking Up the Pieces (1998)
- On the Line (1982)
- The One Game (1988)
- The Other Side of Paradise (1992, co-produced with Grundy)
- Sapphire & Steel (1982, previously produced by ATV)
- Saracen (1989)
- Seekers (1993)
- Sharpe (1993–97)
- Soldier Soldier (1991–97)
- Stanley and the Women (1991)
- Tanamera – Lion of Singapore (1989, co-produced with Grundy)
- Tales of Sherwood Forest (1989)
- Tales out of School (1983)
- TECX (1990)
- Thief Takers (1995–97)
- The Shell Seekers (1989)
- The Waiting Time (1999)
- The Country Diary of an Edwardian Lady (1984)
- The Widowmaker (1990)
- The Woman in Black (1989)
- When the Whales Came (1989, co-produced with Golden Swan)
- Unnatural Causes (1986)
- Yesterday's Dreams (1987)

=== Comedy ===
- About Face (1989–91)
- All Cricket and Wellies (1986)
- All in the Game (1993)
- And There's More (1985–88)
- Astronauts (1982–83, previously produced by ATV)
- Barbara (1999–2003)
- Bushell on the Box (1996)
- The Cabbage Patch (1983)
- Cool Head (1991)
- Comedy Firsts (1995)
- Constant Hot Water (1986)
- Cue Gary (1987)
- Cuffy (1983)
- Des O'Connor Tonight (1993–99, previously produced by Thames Television)
- Dead Ernest (1982)
- Eh Brian! It's a Whopper (1984)
- Father Charlie (1982)
- Freddie Starr (1993–98)
- Gas Street (1988)
- Girls on Top (1985–86)
- Gone to the Dogs/Gone to Seed (1991–92)
- Goodnight and God Bless (1983)
- Hardwicke House (1987)
- I Thought You'd Gone (1984)
- The Joe Longthorne Show (1988–91)
- Just a Gigolo (1993)
- A Kind of Living (1988–90)
- Law and Disorder (1994, co-produced with Thames Television)
- Les Girls (1988)
- Married for Life (1996, co-produced with Sony Pictures Television)
- Mike Reids, Mates and Music (1984)
- Mog (1985–86)
- Mr. Bean (1993-95, previously produced by Thames Television)
- New Faces (1986–88, previously produced by ATV)
- The Nineteenth Hole (1989)
- The Old Boy Network (1992)
- The Other 'Arf (1982–84, previously produced by ATV)
- Outside Edge (1994–96)
- O.T.T. (1982)
- Paul Merton in Galton and Simpson's... (1996–97)
- Paul Squire, Esq/PS It's Paul Squire (1983)
- Pull the Other One (1984)
- Roll Over Beethoven (1985)
- Saturday Stayback (1983)
- Saturday Royal (1983)
- Spitting Image (1984–96)
- Spooner's Patch (1982, previously produced by ATV)
- Starburst (1982–83, previously produced by ATV)
- Shine on Harvey Moon (1982–85, co-produced with Witzend)
- Tom Jones: The Right Time (1992)
- Troubles and Strife (1985–86)
- Valentine Park (1987–88)
- Very Big Very Soon (1991)
- The Upper Hand (1990–96, co-produced with Sony Pictures Television)
- Young at Heart (1982, previously produced by ATV)
- Young, Gifted and Broke (1989)
- Wayne Dobson – A Kind of Magic (1990–92)

=== Documentaries and features ===
- 24 Hours (1996–99)
- 30 Minutes (1999–2004)
- The Album Show (1993–94)
- Ancient Lives (1984, for Channel 4)
- Apollo 13 to the Edge and the Back (1993, co-production with WGBH-TV)
- Asian Eye (1993–2001)
- Burp! Pepsi v. Coke in the Ice-Cold War (1984)
- Central Lobby (1983–2006) (2015–)
- Central News (1982–)
- Central Sport
- Central Week (1986)
- Central Weekend (1986–2001)
- The Cook Report (1987–99)
- Chicken Ranch (1982)
- Death of a Nation: The Timor Conspiracy (1994)
- Eastern Mix (1996–2001)
- Encounter (1983–93)
- Eco (1984–87)
- England Their England (1978–88)
- Find a Family (1989–91)
- First Cut (1994–2004)
- Gardening Time (1983–95)
- Getting On (1982–87)
- God, the Universe and Everything Else (1988)
- Heart of the Country (1989–2006)
- Here and Now (1986–89)
- Home Town (1988–90)
- It's Your Shout (1994–2003)
- Jesus 2000 (2000)
- Legacy of Civilization (1989)
- Link (1982–99)
- Look Good, Feel Great (1987)
- Loved Ones (1994)
- Missing (Missing: Have You Seen This Person?) (1993–97)
- Network First (1994–97, contributions)
- Not Fade Away (1996–98)
- N'Division (1982)
- The Nuclear Age (1988)
- On the Ball (1998–2004)
- Our House (1996–2004)
- Premiere (1996–98)
- The Price of Progress (1987)
- Pulling Power (1997–2005)
- Respect (1995)
- Royal International Air Tattoo (1994–2002)
- Seeds of Despair (1984)
- Seeds of Hope (1985–86)
- Sob Sisters (1989)
- Sky High (2001–07)
- Travel Trails (1993–1995)
- The Night the Bombs went off (1999)
- The Struggle for Democracy (1990, co-production with Canadian Broadcasting Corporation)
- The Tuesday Special (1991–97)
- The Other Americas (1992, co-production with WGBH-TV)
- Viewpoint (1986–93)
- Vietnam (1983, co-production with WGBH-TV)
- Workout (1986)
- Xpress (1995)

=== Game shows ===
- The $64,000 Question (1990–93)
- Anything for Money (1991–92, for Sky 1)
- Blockbusters (1983–93; 1994–95 for Sky 1)
- Bob's Your Uncle (1991–92)
- Body Heat (1994–96)
- Bullseye (1982–95; previously produced by ATV)
- Celebrity Squares (1993–97, co-produced with Grundy; previously produced by ATV)
- Dale's Supermarket Sweep (1993–2001, co-produced with Talbot Television, Fremantle Productions (UK))
- Family Fortunes (1982–85, 1987–2002; previously produced by ATV)
- Home Run (1990s)
- Lingo (1987–88)
- Midas Touch (1995–96, co-produced with Grundy)
- Pot of Gold (1993–95, co-produced with Grundy)
- The Price is Right (1984–88; Sky 1 version 1989)
- Sporting Triangles (1987–90)
- Steal (1990)
- Take Your Pick! (1994-98, previously produced by Thames Television)
- Swot or Wot? (1994–95)

== See also ==
- Murder of Tracey Turner – when in 1994 ITV Central broadcast a reconstruction of a recent murder, it incited the killer Alun Kyte to go out and commit the murder of Turner

ITV regional service
Preceded by ATV Network	Midlands; 1 January 1982 – present	Current provider as ITV Central
Preceded by ATV Network	Oxfordshire; 1 January 1982 – 3 December 2006 (on-air brand & franchise); 4 December 2006 – 31 December 2013 (franchise only)	Succeeded by ITV Thames Valley
