= Castle Haven (TV series) =

British TV soap (1969–1970)

- Genre: Soap opera
- Created by: Kevin Laffan
- Country of origin: United Kingdom
- No. of episodes: 100

Production
- Running time: 30 minutes
- Production company: Yorkshire Television

Original release
- Network: ITV
- Release: 4 April 1969 – 26 March 1970

Castle Haven is a British soap opera, set around the residents of two Victorian seaside houses that had been converted into a series of flats and bedsits. It was first broadcast on 4 April 1969, but cancelled just under a year later on 26 March 1970.

100 episodes were produced, but it is believed that only fifteen minutes of the series is still in existence; the rest were wiped after transmission, as per the (then commonplace) procedure of wiping videotape.

== Main cast ==
- Sally James as Jo Mercer
- Roy Barraclough as Harry Everitt
- Jack Carr as Philip Mercer
- Kathy Staff as Lorna Everitt
- Gretchen Franklin as Sarah Meeks
- Jill Summers as Delilah Hilldrup
- Sharon Campbell as Sylvia Everitt
- Alan Guy as Dickie Everitt
- George Waring as Tom Meeks
- Sidonie Bond as Fiona Morris
- Robin Ford as Eric Waters
- Lala Lloyd as Mabel Waters
- Colin Rix as Ivor Davies
- Ann Way as Alice Davies
- John Comer as Sid Buller
- Ray Gatenby as Edward Pack
