= Tiswas =

British children's TV series (1974–1982)

- The 'classic' version of the Tiswas logo as designed by Stuart Kettle, revised by Chris Wroe
- Genre: Children's entertainment
- Created by: Peter Tomlinson
- Presented by: Chris Tarrant; Sally James; Lenny Henry; Bob Carolgees; John Gorman; Gordon Astley; Den Hegarty; John Asher; Peter Tomlinson; Trevor East
- Country of origin: United Kingdom
- Original language: English
- No. of series: 8
- No. of episodes: 304

Production
- Production location: ATV Centre
- Production companies: ATV (1974–1981); Central (1982)

Original release
- Network: ITV
- Release: 5 January 1974 – 3 April 1982

Related
- O.T.T. Saturday Stayback

Tiswas (/ˈtɪzwɒz/; an acronym of "Today Is Saturday: Watch And Smile") is a British children's television series that originally aired on Saturday mornings from 5 January 1974 to 3 April 1982 and was produced for the ITV network by ATV.

It was created by ATV continuity announcer Peter Tomlinson (later to become a regular presenter on the show) following a test period in 1973 when he tried out a few competitions and "daft stuff" between the programmes.

== Overview ==
Tiswas began life as a 'links' strand between many 'filler' programmes, such as cartoons and old films. The popularity of the presenters' links soon eclipsed the staple diet of filler.

The correct meaning of the Tiswas initials – Today Is Saturday: Watch And Smile – was confirmed by host Chris Tarrant on the Tiswas Reunited special of 2007, although Today Is Saturday: Wear A Smile had also been often cited, albeit incorrectly. "Tiswas", as a word meaning "A state of nervous agitation or confusion ... physical disorder or chaos", is attested from 1960 by the Oxford English Dictionary.

It was originally produced as a Midlands regional programme by ATV, and was first broadcast live on 5 January 1974. The then federal structure of ITV, with its independent regional companies, meant that not all of these stations broadcast the show when it became available for networked transmission. Over time most ITV regions chose to broadcast it, with Granada Television and Southern Television being among the last to pick up the show, in 1979, the year of the ITV technicians’ strike. Tyne Tees and Ulster eventually decided to take Tiswas for its final series in 1981.

The show was hosted by Chris Tarrant between 1974 and 1981, with Sally James joining as co-host in 1977. Following Tarrant's departure, James became the show's main host. Regular performers included Lenny Henry, John Gorman (former member of 1960s cult band The Scaffold) and Bob Carolgees, the latter with his puppet, Spit the Dog. Jim Davidson also made occasional appearances. On the programme, Birmingham folk-singer and comedian Jasper Carrott was to introduce the nation to the "Dying Fly Dance". Like its cleaner BBC counterpart, Multi-Coloured Swap Shop, it had a running order but no script (with the exception of some specific sketches). The programme was broadcast from Studio 3 at ATV Centre in Birmingham; this was the weekday home for the company's regional news magazine, ATV Today.

The show was a stitch-together of competitions, film clips and pop promos, just about held together by sketches and links from the cast. The show also regularly featured spoofs of BBC children's programming.

A feature of Tiswas was "The Cage" wherein initially the child audience, later their parents and, finally, members of the public were confined and periodically doused in water (one spin-off of the series was the hit "The Bucket of Water Song", performed by the Four Bucketeers). This became so popular that the 100th show (broadcast from the Hednesford Hills Raceway) featured several hundred fans lining the racetrack whilst a fire-engine of the local brigade drove around the track and hosed them down with water.

Another feature of Tiswas was its spoof gardening segment Compost Corner, which Chris Tarrant later revealed was a ruse to get an audience callback in the style of Crackerjack. This feature regularly featured Lenny Henry – complete with khaki shorts; Hawaiian shirt; and ginger fake beard – performing an impersonation of David Bellamy, with gardening-based puns and jokes.

Lenny Henry also performed a regular slot of Newsflashes as Trevor McDoughnut – an impersonation of ITN newsreader Trevor McDonald – in which he performed news-based puns and jokes, punctuated by buckets of water being thrown at him. Henry also regularly performed an impersonation of Tommy Cooper, in which he either told a joke (which often ended with the Phantom Flan Flinger – standing behind Henry – slapping two flans into either side of Henry's head); or performed a spoof magic trick.

From the fourth series onwards, the series was frequently visited by the Phantom Flan Flinger, who would throw custard pies ("flans"), buckets of water, gunge, sprayers, etc. around the studio. Both Tarrant and the Flan Flinger would take great delight in trying to 'flan' cameramen who would go to great lengths to avoid being hit.

=== The logo ===
The original logo featured the word "TISWAS" in chunky letters. A later version of this logo featured a circle going round the edge with "Today Is Saturday Watch And Smile" embossed upon it. The classic "zig-zag" logo designed by Stuart Kettle appeared in 1977 – this initially featured a mechanical bird flying above it, but later, Chris Wroe (who drew all of the classic caricatures of the Tiswas team) replaced this with a drawing of the Phantom Flan Flinger.

== Timeline ==
=== Series 1 (1974) ===
The first series was intended to be eleven episodes, purely acting as links between the usual staple fillers of old films and cartoons that ATV would transmit on Saturday mornings. Presented by Chris Tarrant and John Asher from merely a desk in a continuity studio, the pair had to rely on ad-libs and jokes sent in by viewers. Within a few weeks, the show was moved to studio 3 at ATV Centre (a studio usually reserved for amongst other programmes, the news magazine programme, ATV Today) from which Tiswas was produced for the majority of its run.

Owing to an industrial dispute by technicians at ATV, this initial run was only nine programmes in length, but was so well-received that a second series was commissioned.

Billed in TV Times as "Today Is Saturday or the Tis-was Show", the title sequence features both "Today Is Saturday" and the original "Tiswas" chunky letters logo, shown over a background very similar to that of The Golden Shot. The sequence featured clips from various films and Disney cartoons, backed by a funky jazz number known as "Atomic Butterfly" (which also seems to have been used for Sports Arena, an HTV Wales sports programme in the early 1970s).

=== Series 2 (1974–1976) ===
The presenting team was doubled, and these were usually culled from ATV's presentation department. Chris Tarrant and John Asher retained their roles as the main presenters, although John would leave during this series. From the ranks at ATV, other regular presenters were established, notably sports reporter Trevor East (later director of sport at Setanta Sports) and announcer Peter Tomlinson (later to become managing director of Saga Radio West Midlands and High Sheriff of the West Midlands).

Producer Peter Harris left the show in the summer, to help produce fellow cult TV success The Muppet Show at ATV's London-orientated operation in Elstree.

=== Series 3 (1976–1977) ===
Chris Tarrant, Peter Tomlinson and Trevor East were the main presenters. Almost all these shows were produced by Sid Kilbey. The 2 April 1977 show was a landmark edition, as part of the programme was broadcast outside the Midlands for the first time, on HTV Cymru Wales and HTV West, filling up their 'round-the-regions' compilation of Saturday morning programmes called Ten on Saturday.

=== Series 4 (1977–1978) ===
This series marked an end to the provincial micro-budget shows of the previous series, as the initial edition of this series brought significant changes. Sally James was drafted in as the series' first regular female presenter. She had been the presenter of a regional Saturday morning show in London called Saturday Scene, produced by LWT. Comedian Jim Davidson was intended to be a regular presenter but left after only a few editions, although he would return for cameo appearances. Peter Tomlinson was axed as a regular, which came as a surprise to him.

Chris Tarrant was retained as the anchor presenter, and behind the scenes was annoyed with the changes, particularly the inclusion of a woman as presenter. However, he later retracted this view, having witnessed the progress Tiswas had made with James's contribution.

One significant change almost never happened. ATV management were displeased with the visual slapstick element – the hurling of custard pies and water. They believed this was setting a bad example to the young viewers. Newly drafted producer/director Glyn Edwards managed to retain this vital, messy element by drawing on his experience as a Punch & Judy puppeteer to create a 'villain' character called "The Phantom Flan Flinger", who would be the black-clad masked nemesis of the presenting team, and the main instigator of pie-throwing chaos. The "phantom" was later revealed to be Benny Mills, a taxi driver from Cheswick Green near Solihull.

John Gorman made his debut in this series, but with just four appearances, it would not be until series 5 that he became a regular visitor to the Tiswas studios. Likewise, child performer Paul Hardin made sporadic appearances.

The programme expanded its footprint further outside its home region. As well as appearing in part on HTV, Anglia, Border, Granada and Scottish Television began to screen Tiswas in its entirety. Anglia dropped the series a number of times to pick up other regions' Saturday morning programmes throughout Tiswas's history.

=== Series 5 (1978–1979) ===
John Gorman became a regular performer from November onwards. Scottish and Granada dropped the series in 1978 in favour of showing other programmes but began carrying the series again in 1979. HTV continued to opt in and out of the programme during Ten on Saturday.

Bob Carolgees made his debut in early 1979, having been told to go on the programme by Irish comic Frank Carson. Carolgees appeared again two weeks later, and Chris was so pleased with his contribution that he decided to make a regular fixture out of Bob.

Lenny Henry made sporadic appearances throughout this series, but was not established as a regular. Child performer Paul Hardin increased his visits to the studios, and could well be considered as a series 5 team member, likewise Sylveste McCoy (who added an "r" to his first name later in his career) who performed surreal comic interludes.

=== Series 6 (1979–1980) ===
Many ITV regions took the programme for the first time, establishing the show strongly in the nation's consciousness.

With an almost national audience, the show became inclusive of its increased viewership by making a bigger role out of specially invited viewer performances. Many of these were children who sang songs or performed dance routines. Chris Tarrant, now producer as well as presenter, found most of these contributions to be of little value, until he came across a unique act by a five-year-old boy, Matthew Butler. Encouraged by his Tiswas-obsessed mother, Butler auditioned for the series wearing a rabbit costume and sang the song "Bright Eyes" made famous by the animated film Watership Down, although his own singing ability was rather poor. Tarrant found this so amusing that he arranged for him to appear on the following Tiswas, as well as many subsequent editions.

Also appearing a number of times in this series was Norman Collier, the Yorkshire comedian best known for his broken microphone routine and chicken impressions.

Another by-product of Tiswas's increased audience was the boost to merchandise sales: an annual book was established, and there was a tour of universities (recognising their adult and teenaged audience) by the Tiswas team, under the name of the Four Bucketeers, which tied in with their spin-off album on CBS Records. This was all born out of one feature of the sixth series – "The Bucket of Water Song", which was such a hit with the viewers that it evolved from an intended one-off to an almost regular part of Tiswas.

Tiswas had been off air owing to the massive strike by ITV technicians, which lasted 11 weeks from August to October 1979.

=== Series 7 (1980–1981) ===
By now, ATV had increased the budget for Tiswas, and Chris Tarrant had more of a say in the programme's production than ever before. The most remembered theme tune was heard for the first time, and the studio set was based around ATV cartoonist Chris Wroe's caricatures of the presenting team.

This series can be considered as the definitive series, due to the material drawn from this era that usually gets an airing on documentaries and clips shows when Tiswas is the subject. In addition, the three video compilations that have been released for sale have been packaged around a seventh series theme, with the bulk of the clips also being from this age.

Midway through this series, Chris Tarrant decided to leave upon its conclusion. Bob Carolgees, Lenny Henry and John Gorman also left after the final edition of series 7. (28 March 1981) They had decamped to start work on O.T.T., a late-night version of Tiswas intended for an adult audience, which would debut in 1982. The only regular Tiswas presenter left was Sally James, who stayed on for series 8.

=== Series 8 (1981–1982) ===
The last series had its format heavily tinkered with by ATV management. They believed that the adult audience should be avid viewers of Chris' 'late-night' Tiswas, and therefore Tiswas itself should focus on its child audience. It was also the first time Tyne Tees and Ulster started to screen the series.

The new presenting team consisted of Midlands DJ Gordon Astley, former Darts frontman Den Hegarty and comic impressionist Fogwell Flax. Veteran Tiswas presenter Sally James stayed on and became the series' Music Editor, but decided to leave towards the series' end. This was likely to be a factor in Central Television's decision not to bring the programme back for a ninth series.

Semi-regulars were dwarf actor David Rappaport who played characters such as 'Green Nigel' (in a pastiche of BBC programme Blue Peter) and the Fonz-like 'Shades', Emil Wolk and puppeteer Trevor James with a giant parrot, presumably to fill the void left by Bob Carolgees.

At the end of 1981, a restructure of ITV's broadcast franchises saw ATV win back the franchise for the Midlands on condition of changes in management, regional output and branding. Thus, the first part of the series was produced by ATV and the second part by Central Television.

The decision by TVS, the new ITV station in the south and south-east of England, to drop the Central-produced half of the last series in favour of its own Saturday morning programme No. 73 saw fans of Tiswas picket outside its studios in Southampton. The eighth series was broadcast on TVS upon the conclusion of No. 73's first series.

During its ATV days the chairman of the station, Lew Grade, was said to have taken a personal dislike to the show but was persuaded to let it continue, even arguing in its defence to criticism from the IBA. It was believed that the new management at Central frowned upon the anarchy of Tiswas (and the common popularity of another production, the soap opera Crossroads) and in a desire to make the station more upmarket than its previous incarnation took the evidence of declining audiences for the new format as justification to axe Tiswas after series 8, the final episode of Tiswas was transmitted live on 3 April 1982, a day after the start of the Falklands War, ending the entire show with the cast singing "Auld Flang Syne."

== Transmissions ==
Series	Start date	End date	Episodes
1	5 January 1974	2 March 1974	9
2	14 September 1974	26 June 1976	94
3	4 September 1976	28 May 1977	36
4	10 September 1977	27 May 1978	38
5	9 September 1978	26 May 1979	38
6	27 October 1979	3 May 1980	28
7	6 September 1980	28 March 1981	30
8	5 September 1981	3 April 1982	31

=== Missing episodes ===
Almost every edition of Tiswas was transmitted live, and only recorded in case of any future IBA investigation (as was standard practice at the time). Accordingly, they suffered the same fate as a number of 1970s children's series, in that they were thought to have no further commercial use (the idea of home video entertainment was still in its infancy), and therefore many master tapes were wiped for re-use. As a result, very few programmes officially exist in their entirety. Those that were kept were often stored in poor conditions, which led to severe picture deterioration, so they are no longer of broadcast quality.

However, some did survive; many viewers made their own recordings and in many cases these are the only existing copies of the programmes. Members of the production team and performers on the show would also record their appearances, leading to many episodes existing in private hands. In 2006, ITV began a search for many missing ITV programmes, including Tiswas, for their Raiders of the Lost Archive series broadcast in 2007.

Their website reveals that only 22 episodes are known to officially exist in their entirety: episode 60 from 30 August 1975, four episodes from 1978, two episodes from 1979, two episodes from 1980, five episodes from 1981 and nine episodes from 1982. Incomplete segments from show 151 (broadcast on 10 December 1977), an episode from 1978 and two episodes from 1979 are also known to have survived.

The prolific TiswasOnline fansite features an in-depth episode guide for the whole series, detailing where an episode is known to exist, whether as a private home recording or in the official archive. ITV plc has confirmed to TiswasOnline that many more programme elements (other than those officially known to exist) have been kept, but as yet these have not been fully catalogued. This may include insert material such as animations and graphics or filmed clips. Furthermore, the Tiswas Reunited programme in 2007 resulted in the discovery of further footage.

== Related programmes ==
=== O.T.T. ===
On 2 January 1982, Tarrant, Carolgees, Gorman, Randolph Sutherland and Henry launched a late-night show – with the up-and-coming comics Alexei Sayle and Helen Atkinson-Wood called O.T.T. (standing for "Over the Top") which was effectively an "adult" version of Tiswas – in other words, it attempted to be just as anarchic, but with swearing and occasional topless women.

O.T.T. was not the success Tiswas had been, proving controversial and running for just one series. It is today chiefly remembered for the naked 'Balloon Dance' performed by The Greatest Show on Legs, including comedian Malcolm Hardee.

=== Saturday Stayback ===
Saturday Stayback was a short-lived (January–February 1983) late night comedy show based in a pub. Although intended as some sort of sequel to O.T.T., this differed quite a lot, for it was all recorded rather than the live chaos of its predecessor. It mainly consisted of comedy sketches, with some live music acts – usually Thin Lizzy and Roy Wood. Saturday Stayback received much less controversy than O.T.T., and also introduced new talent such as Phil Cool and Tony Slattery. However, it was not a ratings success and lasted only six episodes. Chris Tarrant and Bob Carolgees were the only ex-Tiswas personnel regularly seen on screen, and John Gorman helped out on writing duty.

=== Tiswas Reunion ===
A definitive line-up of Tiswas presenters regrouped for a resurrection of Tiswas on the ITV Telethon of 1988. This took place in LWT's South Bank studios in London, culminating in an outside performance of "The Bucket of Water Song".

=== Ministry of Mayhem ===
In late 2005, ITV's Saturday morning show Ministry of Mayhem had a special edition featuring presenters from past Saturday morning shows, including Tiswas. Representing Tiswas was Sally James, although Chris Tarrant did a video link-up for a brief interview during the show. Out of the cult Saturday morning shows that were focused on, Tiswas was significantly the most prominent, with many clips shown from it, and even a re-enactment of two Tiswas staples – the Cage and the Pass The Pie game.

=== Tiswas on Dick and Dom in da Bungalow ===
In December 2005, BBC Saturday morning show Dick and Dom in da Bungalow featured a thirty-year-old man singing "Bright Eyes" with his friends as part of a talent spot. This person was Matthew Lewis, formerly known as Matthew Butler, who performed his unique rendition of the song back in 1980 on Tiswas when he was aged five. Presenters Richard McCourt and Dominic Wood took the opportunity to praise Matthew, as they are fans of Tiswas, and also to dispel recent tabloid rumours of Dick and Dom resurrecting Tiswas on ITV. However, Wood did present one episode of Dick and Dom in da Bungalow wearing a Tiswas T-shirt.

=== Lenny Henry on It Started With Swap Shop ===
Lenny Henry appeared on the BBC's It Started With Swap Shop programme in 2006, in which he spoke to Noel Edmonds about Tiswas being the rival of Swap Shop during the entire era.

=== Tiswas Reunited – The 2007 Special ===
A new programme to celebrate 25 years since the final Tiswas show was broadcast by ITV1 on 16 June 2007, it started with the traditional ATV logo and jingle. This programme had been delayed from May in order to allow for an extended transmission slot. Celebrities and 'old Tiswas mates' alike joined in the fun. In an interview publicising this, Chris Tarrant put out an appeal to the public to submit any surviving video footage of the series to be included in the new programme – which resulted in the discovery of further footage.

A DVD release of the programme, featuring an extended edition plus a short featurette on the history of Tiswas, was released shortly after transmission.

From the official press release:

For one night only, ITV1 brings you TiSWAS REUNITED, a one-off special reuniting the stars of the iconic groundbreaking children’s show TiSWAS. With a wealth of clips and reminiscences from the many stars who appeared on the series, the team will recreate the chaos and mayhem of those heady days of the show that broke the mould. TiSWAS REUNITED is new and exclusive to ITV1, spring 2007.

The producers of the programme looked for people who were involved in the original series, whether they were in the audience, appeared as a guest, won a competition ("pulled up by the ears") or in any other capacity. The TiswasOnline website helped with these searches (and numerous other aspects of the new programme), and people could submit their details directly to the production team and apply to be in the cage.

A new logo for the programme was produced – it features the regular 'zig-zag' logo (including the Phantom Flan Flinger) with "Reunited" rubber-stamped across it.

The official Tiswas Reunited 'mini-site' features exclusive material about the making of the programme, as well as blogs by those who took part in the programme itself (guests and residents of the Cage!)

The ITV broadcast referred only briefly to John Asher and Trevor East, the programme's original presenters, and omitted to make any reference to the eighth and final series (possibly because it was the one series in which Reunited's Executive Producer Chris Tarrant was not involved.)

== Merchandise ==
Tiswas was a pioneer for children's television, making its way to shop shelves. Books, T-shirts, a regular magazine, an album, various singles and even a ceramic money box have all been daubed with the Tiswas logo.

=== Magazine ===
A magazine counterpart was produced with interviews with cast, quizzes and letters. This appeared initially as Tiswas Family Fun Book at the beginning of 1981 and developed into Tiswas Magazine from September 1981 to coincide with the final series.

=== Annuals ===
Four annual hardcover books were produced in Tiswas's later years. Presenter/performer John Gorman wrote the first three (published in the autumn of 1979, 1980, 1981), and Ollie Spencer the 1983 edition (prepared in spring 1982 and published that autumn, featuring presenters and characters from the final 1981–82 series).

=== Video compilations ===
In the early 1990s, three VHS compilations were made available. The majority of Tiswas never survived as recordings, but among collectors, some with the earliest domestic VCRs, and some studio copies of later editions.

These compilations were not like ordinary editions of Tiswas, in that 'non-original' content such as music videos, film clips and cartoons were stripped out. Original features like competition spots and pop interviews were also excluded, in favour of highlighting the show's legacy to comedy and visual slapstick.

==== Best of the Best Bits ====
The first compilation, lasting about an hour, and purely full of comedy sketches from the series. Some of the most repeated clips from the series have made the grade for this compilation – notably some News Flash sketches with Lenny Henry as 'Trevor McDoughnut' (including one where the target of the spoof – Trevor McDonald – takes over as a surprise) and the 'viewer's letters' clip where Sally James is pied and drenched in semolina, baked beans and custard. Moving slightly away from comedy, the music video for the Four Bucketeers' "Bucket of Water Song" is included.

==== More of the Best Bits ====
The second compilation continued in the same vein as the first. Frank Carson being soaked unexpectedly is a running gag, and there is a full rendition of 'Bright Eyes' from Matthew Butler. A music video for The Four Bucketeers' Water Is Wonderful ends the compilation.

==== Comedy Capers ====
This was targeted at the stand-up comedy VHS market at the time, and the inlay cover made great mention of comic legends' appearances, such as Spike Milligan, Michael Palin and Bernard Manning. Content-wise, it is very similar to the previous two compilations, with many sketches being performed by the Tiswas team. However, this compilation has no contribution from the Four Bucketeers.

=== DVD ===
Apart from the Tiswas Reunited DVD, released by ITV DVD a week after transmission of the 2007 programme, the only other Tiswas DVD available is The Best of Tiswas.

Issued in October 2005 by Network DVD, The Best of Tiswas was a straight DVD issuing of the three VHS compilations – Best of the Best Bits, More of the Best Bits and Comedy Capers. Being on DVD format, it has better picture quality than the VHS version. However, owing to the rarity of some Tiswas material (many episodes surviving only on off-air recordings) there is some understandably rough-looking footage here and there. Additionally, the More of the Best Bits compilation is entirely sourced from a VHS copy, for the original VHS release's master tape could not be located in time for transfer.
