= Pullover Productions =

Television production company

Pullover Productions Ltd was a television production company responsible for a number of UK children's programmes in the 1980s. The company specialised in puppetry using black light theatre techniques, particularly animating everyday objects such as umbrellas, dishcloths, balls or shoes.

== History ==
The company was founded by two Czech refugees from the 1968 invasion of Prague, Susan Kodicek and Rosta Cerny, along with producer Maggie Clarke. Kodicek and Cerny had worked together in the theatre for a number of years as the Black Theatre Group of Prague (as distinct from the better known Black Light Theatre of Prague), performing puppet-based Variety acts with Mike Yarwood and Paul Daniels, and two full-length shows, Plop and Big Me and the Wilting Witch for Greenwich Theatre. They moved into television when the BBC gave them a regular slot on the children's show Vision On. They moved to Granada TV for the series Daisy, Daisy where they performed black theatre segments and the in-show puppets Wriggle and Splodge, and eventually pitched a new idea for a further series Once Upon a Time, which featured a short black-theatre puppetry sequence accompanying a story with a similar theme. The show ran for several years, first with presenter Peter Davison, later with singer Mark Wynter; it transmuted into Sounds like a Story. They also contributed characters named Mr and Mrs Macaroni (notable for speaking a language consisting entirely of the names of Russian composers) to Our Backyard.

== Pullover ==
Keen to create something more of their own, Kodicek and Cerny created Pullover Productions to make a series for pre-schoolers called Pullover. The programme was about a stuffed toy that comes to life each night and has adventures in the bedroom of its owner (played by Kodicek's son Danny). In most of the episodes, Pullover would find himself in a different world, where he would meet a friend, get into some mild peril and finally return to his world and his bed.

The programme was notable for the fact that apart from a few lines spoken by the child at the beginning (he would read a short story to Pullover before going to sleep, introducing the subject of the episode), there was no speech. Instead, all episodes were scored with music throughout, providing a kind of 'narration'.

Only thirteen episodes of Pullover were produced. The series was part financed by ITC Entertainment, who also handled international distribution rights. The series was exported to several countries including Brunei, New Zealand, South Africa, Malaysia and Hong Kong. UK broadcast was by Central on the ITV Network. At its peak during its first broadcast in 1982 it reached number 3 in the children's viewing charts. It was later repeated in a lunchtime slot on ITV in 1986, but has not been seen on television since then.

A knitting pattern, produced by Robin, which if faithfully followed would result in a home-made Pullover toy, was released.

== FoxTales ==
Following Pullover, the company created a more mainstream programme, FoxTales, adapting a number of classic Eastern European folk tales to a cast of animal characters, narrated by Grandpa Fox (again Peter Davison). The show was well received but suffered from the fact that budgets for children's programming were being cut as imported animated series became increasingly cheaper to obtain. The series was also aired in Finland on YLE in 1986 narrated by Matti Ruohola and Norway on NRK in 1987 narrated by Lars Andreas Larssen.

== Later work ==
Kodicek and Cerny continued to produce programmes for a few more years, but eventually moved on. Kodicek went on to write and direct a feature film about her experiences as a child in Stalinist Czechoslovakia, and died in 2011. Cerny worked for the German-language branch of Czech radio and died in 2015.
