= Four Bucketeers =

The Four Bucketeers were an ad hoc music/water-throwing group from the ITV children's programme Tiswas.

Officially, the Four were Chris Tarrant, Sally James, John Gorman and Bob Carolgees; sometimes Lenny Henry contributed as well. Gorman was the musical talent in the group, having been part of The Scaffold and the Grimms. The musicians backing them up included Ollie Halsall (guitar), John Halsey (drums) and Clive Griffiths (bass).

The Four Bucketeers' best-known number (and also their highest-charting single) was "The Bucket Of Water Song", which reached No. 26 in the UK Singles Chart in 1980.

Originally the song was composed and performed as a sketch within the Tiswas programme. According to Sally James, "John came in one day and he said ‘I’ve sort of got this idea’. It’s a march basically, and we all sing this song. And it’s another excuse to chuck buckets of water! So obviously we didn’t do it in the studio. We had this little area outside the back of the studio where a camera would sort of poke out of the window, so we ended the show down there marching about, sploshing all this water from the buckets. And then the next week it was incredible, because the people were jamming the switchboard, ‘I’ve got to have this record!’. There was never any idea that it would be a record, but of course we did quickly make a record and it became a hit. It just all happened so left-of-field and so unplanned…but then that’s how a lot of things did happen in Tiswas. Things that you think would work, don’t, and things that you ‘Oh that’ll be good for a one-off’ end up being huge hits".

The moniker 'The Four Bucketeers' came about as a way of circumnavigating any potential copyright difficulties of using the 'Tiswas' brand when Tarrant and Co. performed the song outside of the TV show situation, and the initial record release. Ultimately though, a compromise was reached and thereafter, the phrase 'Tiswas presents The Four Bucketeers' was used.

The aquatic theme was carried through into a less successful follow-up single, the anthemic waltz-time "Water Is Wonderful", which eulogised:

'Water is wonderful, water's superb
'Water's too powerful to conquer or curb
'Water's at its best when you can chuck it
'Over yourself from out of a bucket.'

An album, entitled Tiswas Presents The Four Bucketeers, was also released. This included both singles (albeit a different version of "Water Is Wonderful") together with other skits from the television series. Contrary to the impression given by the singles, these were not all concerned with pailborne aquatic antics. All of The Four Bucketeers' records were produced by Neil Innes.

A third single was released from the album featuring Matthew Butler (the 6 year old who dressed as a rabbit) singing "Bright Eyes".
