= Bob Carolgees =

British comedy entertainer (born 1948)

- Born: Robert Frederick Johnson; 12 May 1948 (age 78)
- Years active: 1979–2006
- Known for: Spit the Dog

Bob Carolgees (born Robert Frederick Johnson; 12 May 1948) is a British comedy entertainer who appeared on the Saturday morning TV series Tiswas and later in its adult versions O.T.T. and Saturday Stayback. He is best known for appearing with a canine puppet named Spit the Dog. Carolgees also worked for eight years on the TV show Surprise Surprise and on children's game show Concentration. In popular culture, he has cameo roles with Spit the Dog.

== Career ==
In the early 1970s, Carolgees ran a DJ and modelling school in Liverpool. After a five-week course, DJs and models were tested in front of an audience at the Sportsmans Club in central Liverpool. However, it was Carolgees himself who was spotted at these events by agents, who offered him the chance to appear on TV. He first appeared in a guest spot on Tiswas on 31 March 1979.

Clowning around with a monkey puppet named Charlie, Carolgees went down well with the viewing audience and, after being invited back for several guest spots, he soon became a team presenter. Carolgees, in pyjamas and headband, was also the Tiswas character Houdi Elbow, a comedy psychic and small-time magician.

As well as gaining national fame with these and Spit the Dog (plus Cough the Cat), he was also part of The Four Bucketeers who made the UK Top 30 in 1980, even making a Top of the Pops appearance.

Carolgees went on to work for eight years alongside Cilla Black on Surprise Surprise, and for nearly two decades he entertained British armed forces around the world. He also fronted pop/game show Hold Tight!, produced by Granada Television for Children's ITV and game show Concentration.

Throughout the 1980s, Carolgees appeared in a series of TV adverts for Hellmann's Mayonnaise.

Carolgees was the subject of This Is Your Life in 1994 when he was surprised by Michael Aspel at the Lyceum Theatre in Crewe.

Carolgees used to own a candle shop, Carolgees Candles, in Frodsham, Cheshire. He temporarily came out of show business retirement to appear with all his former colleagues in Tiswas Reunited on ITV on 16 June 2007.

Carolgees appeared in pantomime at Hull New Theatre for the 2013 run of Jack and the Beanstalk, replacing an unwell Keith Harris. Carolgees was quoted as saying: "What I had missed most was panto". In 2017 Carolgees again came out of retirement for pantomime.

== Spit the Dog ==
Spit the Dog is a puppet best known, as his name suggests, for his spitting. An early Spit the Dog puppet raised more than £5,000 at a Christie's auction in 2004.

== Stage name ==
The name Carolgees comes from friends Carole and George Dunmore who owned a record shop called Carolgees Records & Cassettes. Carole Gee was his assistant in an earlier stint as a youth leader in what is now the mac in the late 1960s. Carole and George also operated a mobile disco called Carolgees Cabaret Disco around Merseyside, which is where Carolgees developed his act.

== In popular culture ==
Carolgees received a mention in every episode of That Peter Kay Thing, and appeared in the episode "Leonard". He and Spit the Dog can briefly be seen hosting a Trisha style early morning discussion show in Peter Kay's follow-up comedy Phoenix Nights. He can also be seen on the back of a leaflet in the toilets in the first episode. Carolgees and puppet Spit the Dog appeared in a 2015 episode of ITV series Who's Doing the Dishes?
