= 2012 in Scottish television =

This is a list of events in Scottish television from 2012.

== Events ==
=== March ===
- 5 March – ITV and STV sign a deal which (if approved by Ofcom) could see more networked programmes appearing on television in Scotland. The agreement would end a three-year hiatus which has seen many major ITV programmes absent from schedules in Scotland.
- 14 March – 60th anniversary of BBC One Scotland.
- 28 March – Debut of Watching Ourselves: 60 Years of TV in Scotland, a BBC documentary series celebrating the best of television in Scotland as television in Scotland celebrates its 60th anniversary.

=== April ===
- 18 April
  - In a rare move for British courts, television cameras are allowed into High Court of Justiciary to film the sentencing of David Gilroy for the murder of Suzanne Pilley.
  - STV announces a boost to its production arm.
- 27 April
  - A poll conducted by Scottish Legal News indicates that two-thirds of Scottish lawyers, advocates and academics are in favour of allowing television cameras into courtrooms after 65% of those who responded to the survey responded positively to the idea.
  - STV's Edinburgh operation is moved from George Street in the city centre to a new studio at Fountainbridge.

=== May ===
- 1 May – Television executive Richard Horwood expresses concern that television companies bidding for licences to run city-based television services in Scotland may be sidelined because of BBC Alba. In England Freeview has assigned Channel 8 for use by such channels, while in Scotland they have assigned Channel 45 since 8 is designated for Alba.
- 10 May – Prince Charles presents the lunchtime weather forecast during a visit to the BBC Scotland headquarters in Glasgow.
- 27 May – BBC Scotland holds a televised debate on the future of Scotland as part of the United Kingdom. The debate comes two days after First Minister Alex Salmond launches his Party's "Yes" campaign for the 2014 referendum on independence.
- 29 May – BBC Director-General Mark Thompson tells the Scottish Parliament's Education and Culture Committee the BBC has no plans in place for the scenario of an independent Scotland.

=== June ===
- 14 June – The Daily Record reports that BSkyB has threatened to cancel their contract to air games from the Scottish Premier League if Rangers F.C. are relegated from the division.

=== July ===
- 6 July
  - Global Television is awarded the contract to broadcast the 2014 Commonwealth Games which will be staged in Glasgow. The footage will be distributed to television companies worldwide, including the UK's BBC.
  - Editworks, a television editing company that has been involved in producing series such as Eggheads and The Sarah Millican Television Programme announces a £200,000 expansion of its operations in Scotland after receiving a £68,000 government grant.
- 19 July – The Scottish Football League approaches broadcasters with a package to show up to 25 live Rangers matches during the 2012–13 season. However, any deal cannot be finalised until the Scottish Football Association grants a transfer of membership to a new company, which replaced The Rangers Football Club Plc after it went into liquidation earlier in the year.
- 31 July – BSkyB signs an agreement for coverage of the Scottish Premier League and Scottish Football League for the next five seasons.

=== August ===
- 2 August – ESPN announces a five-year agreement with the Scottish Premier League to air matches. The deal also includes broadcast rights to Rangers games form the Irn-Bru Third Division.
- 13 August – The deadline for applications to run proposed local TV stations in Glasgow and Edinburgh expires with no major company declaring a public interest in the two licences.
- 14 August – The Digital Spy website reports that Glasgow Caledonian University and Edinburgh Napier University have teamed up with STV to launch bids for local television stations in Glasgow and Edinburgh, which would be called GTV and ETV.

=== September ===
- 4 September – A£30m Scottish Government campaign to raise cancer awareness will include the first ads in the UK to show real pictures of women's breasts that have been affected by cancer.

=== October ===
- 2 October – One of Scotland's leading QCs, Donald Finlay warns MSPs he is "totally and always will be against" television cameras filming criminal trials in Scotland.

=== November ===
- 16 November – The Scottish Premier League and BBC Alba confirm a new two-year deal to continue coverage of matches on the Gaelic TV channel.

=== December ===
- 8 December – STV becomes the first broadcaster to air singer Rod Stewart's Christmas Special a day ahead of its ITV counterparts after securing the worldwide premiere of the show.
- 25 December – The annual Royal Christmas Message is broadcast in 3D for the first time.

== Television series ==
- Reporting Scotland (1968–1983; 1984–present)
- Sportscene (1975–present)
- The Beechgrove Garden (1978–present)
- Only an Excuse? (1993–2020)
- River City (2002–2026)
- The Adventure Show (2005–present)
- Daybreak Scotland (2007–present)
- Trusadh (2008–present)
- STV Rugby (2009–2010; 2011–present)
- Sport Nation (2009–present)
- STV News at Six (2009–present)
- Limmy's Show (2010–2013)
- The Nightshift (2010–present)
- Scotland Tonight (2011–present)

== Ending this year ==
- Gary: Tank Commander (2009–2012)

== Deaths ==
- 4 January – Kerry McGregor, 37, singer-songwriter and actress
- 10 March – Marjorie Thomson, 98, actress (Take the High Road)

== See also ==
- 2012 in Scotland
