= 2019 Canterbury Cup NSW results =

The 2019 Canterbury Cup NSW is the 1st season since the name change, and is the current season of professional rugby league in New South Wales, Australia.

== Regular season ==
=== Round 1 ===
Home	Score	Away	Match Information			
Home	Score	Away	Date and Time	Venue	Referee	Attendance
Newcastle Knights	24–4	Newtown Jets	15 March 2019, 15:45	McDonald Jones Stadium		
Mount Pritchard Mounties	28–28	St. George Illawarra Dragons	15 March 2019, 18:00	Aubrey Keech Reserve		
New Zealand Warriors	14–19	Canterbury-Bankstown Bulldogs	16 March 2019, 12:45	Mount Smart Stadium		
Western Suburbs Magpies	23–4	Blacktown Workers Sea Eagles	16 March 2019, 15:15	Leichdhardt Oval		
South Sydney Rabbitohs	18–14	North Sydney Bears	17 March 2019, 13:10	Redfern Oval		
Penrith Panthers	22–12	Wentworthville Magpies	17 March 2019, 13:50	Panthers Stadium		

=== Round 2 ===
Home	Score	Away	Match Information			
Home	Score	Away	Date and Time	Venue	Referee	Attendance
Newtown Jets	16–32	Mount Pritchard Mounties	23 March 2019, 12:45	Shark Park		
South Sydney Rabbitohs	24–20	St. George Illawarra Dragons	23 March 2019, 14:00	Redfern Oval		
Newcastle Knights	4–20	Penrith Panthers	23 March 2019, 15:15	McDonald Jones Stadium		
Blacktown Workers Sea Eagles	12–32	North Sydney Bears	23 March 2019, 17:20	Lottoland		
Canterbury-Bankstown Bulldogs	22–24	Wentworthville Magpies	24 March 2019, 13:10	Leichhardt Ovall		
Western Suburbs Magpies	48–10	New Zealand Warriors	24 March 2019, 15:55	Campbelltown Stadium		

=== Round 3 ===
Home	Score	Away	Match Information			
Home	Score	Away	Date and Time	Venue	Referee	Attendance
Penrith Panthers	26–24	St. George Illawarra Dragons	30 March 2019, 12:45	Panthers Stadium		
Mount Pritchard Mounties	36–12	Newcastle Knights	30 March 2019, 15:00	Aubrey Keech Reserve		
Blacktown Workers Sea Eagles	18–18	New Zealand Warriors	31 March 2019, 13:00	HE Laybutt Field		
South Sydney Rabbitohs	28–26	Newtown Jets	31 March 2019, 13:10	Redfern Oval		
Western Suburbs Magpies	24–26	Canterbury-Bankstown Bulldogs	31 March 2019, 13:50	Campbelltown Stadium		
Wentworthville Magpies	20–21	North Sydney Bears	31 March 2019, 15:00	Ringrose Park		

=== Round 4 ===
Home	Score	Away	Match Information			
Home	Score	Away	Date and Time	Venue	Referee	Attendance
New Zealand Warriors	22–24	Penrith Panthers	6 April 2019, 11:00	Mount Smart Stadium		
Blacktown Workers Sea Eagles	32–12	South Sydney Rabbitohs	6 April 2019, 12:45	Lottoland		
North Sydney Bears	42–0	Canterbury-Bankstown Bulldogs	7 April 2019, 13:10	North Sydney Oval		
Mount Pritchard Mounties	52–6	Western Suburbs Magpies	7 April 2019, 15:00	Aubrey Keech Reserve		
Wentworthville Magpies	42–10	Newtown Jets	7 April 2019, 15:00	Ringrose Park		
Newcastle Knights	16–34	St. George Illawarra Dragons	7 April 2019, 15:55	McDonald Jones Stadium		

=== Round 5 ===
Home	Score	Away	Match Information			
Home	Score	Away	Date and Time	Venue	Referee	Attendance
New Zealand Warriors	14–18	South Sydney Rabbitohs	13 April 2019, 11:00	Mount Smart Stadium		
Newcastle Knights	16–14	Blacktown Workers Sea Eagles	13 April 2019, 12:45	McDonald Jones Stadium		
Newtown Jets	32–30	North Sydney Bears	13 April 2019, 15:00	Henson Park		
Western Suburbs Magpies	32–12	Penrith Panthers	14 April 2019, 13:10	Leichhardt Oval		
St. George Illawarra Dragons	28–14	Canterbury-Bankstown Bulldogs	14 April 2019, 13:50	Netstrata Jubilee Stadium		
Mount Pritchard Mounties	32–16	Wentworthville Magpies	14 April 2019, 15:55	GIO Stadium		

=== Round 6 ===
Home	Score	Away	Match Information			
Home	Score	Away	Date and Time	Venue	Referee	Attendance
North Sydney Bears	22–10	Newcastle Knights	19 April 2019, 15:00	North Sydney Oval		
Canterbury-Bankstown Bulldogs	6–36	South Sydney Rabbitohs	20 April 2019, 15:15	Belmore Sports Ground		
St. George Illawarra Dragons	44–6	Blacktown Workers Sea Eagles	20 April 2019, 17:15	WIN Stadium		
Newtown Jets	16–18	Penrith Panthers	21 April 2019, 13:10	Henson Park		
Mount Pritchard Mounties	28–22	New Zealand Warriors	21 April 2019, 15:40	GIO Stadium		
Wentworthville Magpies	20–14	Western Suburbs Magpies	22 April 2019, 15:30	Bankwest Stadium		

=== Round 7 ===
Home	Score	Away	Match Information			
Home	Score	Away	Date and Time	Venue	Referee	Attendance
Penrith Panthers	20–18	South Sydney Rabbitohs	26 April 2019, 17:45	Panthers Stadium		
North Sydney Bears	24–50	St. George Illawarra Dragons	26 April 2019, 19:30	North Sydney Oval		
Canterbury-Bankstown Bulldogs	22–16	New Zealand Warriors	27 April 2019, 15:05	Belmore Sports Ground		
Western Suburbs Magpies	32–22	Newtown Jets	28 April 2019, 13:10	Lidcombe Oval		
Newcastle Knights	24–20	Wentworthville Magpies	28 April 2019, 13:50	McDonald Jones Stadium		
Blacktown Workers Sea Eagles	22–24	Mount Pritchard Mounties	28 April 2019, 15:00	HE Laybutt Field		

=== Round 8 ===
Home	Score	Away	Match Information			
Home	Score	Away	Date and Time	Venue	Referee	Attendance
Blacktown Workers Sea Eagles	10–38	Canterbury-Bankstown Bulldogs	4 May 2019, 12:45	Lottoland		
Newtown Jets	26–24	South Sydney Rabbitohs	4 May 2019, 15:00	Henson Park		
New Zealand Warriors	28–12	Newcastle Knights	5 May 2019, 11:45	Mount Smart Stadium		
North Sydney Bears	18–6	Western Suburbs Magpies	5 May 2019, 13:10	North Sydney Oval		
Wentworthville Magpies	30–14	St. George Illawarra Dragons	5 May 2019, 13:50	Bankwest Stadium		
Mount Pritchard Mounties	22–30	Penrith Panthers	5 May 2019, 15:00	Aubrey Keech Reserve		

=== Round 9 ===
General Bye

=== Round 10 (Magic Round) ===
Home	Score	Away	Match Information			
Home	Score	Away	Date and Time	Venue	Referee	Attendance
Canterbury-Bankstown Bulldogs	10–10	Western Suburbs Magpies	Saturday 18 May	Panthers Stadium		
Penrith Panthers	28–10	New Zealand Warriors	Saturday 18 May	Panthers Stadium		
Mount Pritchard Mounties	32–18	South Sydney Rabbitohs	Saturday 18 May	Panthers Stadium		
North Sydney Bears	34–20	Wentworthville Magpies	Sunday May 19	Henson Park		
Newtown Jets	44–28	Blacktown Workers Sea Eagles	Sunday May 19	Henson Park		
St. George Illawarra Dragons	32–6	Newcastle Knights	Sunday May 19	Henson Park		

=== Round 11 ===
Home	Score	Away	Match Information			
Home	Score	Away	Date and Time	Venue	Referee	Attendance
	–					
	–					
	–					
	–					
	–					
	–					

=== Round 12 ===
Home	Score	Away	Match Information			
Home	Score	Away	Date and Time	Venue	Referee	Attendance
	–					
	–					
	–					
	–					
	–					
	–					

=== Round 13 ===
Home	Score	Away	Match Information			
Home	Score	Away	Date and Time	Venue	Referee	Attendance
	–					
	–					
	–					
	–					
	–					
	–					

=== Round 14 ===
Home	Score	Away	Match Information			
Home	Score	Away	Date and Time	Venue	Referee	Attendance
	–					
	–					
	–					
	–					
	–					
	–					

=== Round 15 ===
Home	Score	Away	Match Information			
Home	Score	Away	Date and Time	Venue	Referee	Attendance
	–					
	–					
	–					
	–					
	–					
	–					

=== Round 16 ===
Home	Score	Away	Match Information			
Home	Score	Away	Date and Time	Venue	Referee	Attendance
	–					
	–					
	–					
	–					
	–					
	–					

=== Round 17 ===
Home	Score	Away	Match Information			
Home	Score	Away	Date and Time	Venue	Referee	Attendance
	–					
	–					
	–					
	–					
	–					
	–					

=== Round 18 ===
Home	Score	Away	Match Information			
Home	Score	Away	Date and Time	Venue	Referee	Attendance
	–					
	–					
	–					
	–					
	–					
	–					

=== Round 19 ===
Home	Score	Away	Match Information			
Home	Score	Away	Date and Time	Venue	Referee	Attendance
	–					
	–					
	–					
	–					
	–					
	–					

=== Round 20 ===
Home	Score	Away	Match Information			
Home	Score	Away	Date and Time	Venue	Referee	Attendance
	–					
	–					
	–					
	–					
	–					
	–					

=== Round 21 ===
Home	Score	Away	Match Information			
Home	Score	Away	Date and Time	Venue	Referee	Attendance
	–					
	–					
	–					
	–					
	–					
	–					

=== Round 22 ===
Home	Score	Away	Match Information			
Home	Score	Away	Date and Time	Venue	Referee	Attendance
	–					
	–					
	–					
	–					
	–					
	–					

=== Round 23 ===
Home	Score	Away	Match Information			
Home	Score	Away	Date and Time	Venue	Referee	Attendance
	–					
	–					
	–					
	–					
	–					
	–					

=== Round 24 ===
Home	Score	Away	Match Information			
Home	Score	Away	Date and Time	Venue	Referee	Attendance
	–					
	–					
	–					
	–					
	–					
	–					

== Finals Series ==
Home	Score	Away	Match Information	
Home	Score	Away	Date and Time	Venue
QUALIFYING AND ELIMINATION FINALS
	–			
	–			
	–			
	–			
SEMI-FINALS
	–			
	–			
PRELIMINARY FINALS
	–			
	–			
GRAND FINAL
	–			Bankwest Stadium

Qualifying and elimination finals
1
4
5
8
6
7
2
3

Semi-finals

Preliminary finals

Grand final
Bankwest Stadium

== Grand Final ==
TBD	v	TBD
