= The Verdict (2007 TV series) =

- Genre: Court show Legal drama
- Created by: RDF Media
- Country of origin: United Kingdom
- No. of episodes: 5

Production
- Running time: Varies

Original release
- Network: BBC2
- Release: 11 February – 15 February 2007

The Verdict is a 2007 BBC television programme produced by RDF Media in which twelve celebrities form the jury in the trial of a fictional rape case. The programme was filmed with real legal and medical professionals, but with actors playing the victim, defendants, and witnesses. The jury considered their verdict in front of cameras.

== Synopsis ==
The case features the fictitious trial of a famous international footballer, Damien Scott (played by Javone Prince), and his friend, James Greer (Mark Wood), charged with the rape of a young woman named Anna Crane (Alice O'Connell). The twelve jurors sit in judgement on a four-day unscripted trial in a real courtroom, presided over by a real judge - the recently retired Common Serjeant of London, His Honour Neil Denison QC - with real barristers prosecuting and defending. Jane Humphryes QC and George Carter-Stephenson QC appeared for the Defence, whilst Joanna Greenberg QC appeared for the Prosecution. The jury retired to begin their deliberations, with TV cameras to observe the jury as it reached its verdict.

The jury eventually reaches either unanimous or majority verdicts of not guilty on all counts. Several members of the jury stated that they believed the rapes had taken place, but that insufficient evidence prevented a conviction.

== Criticisms ==
The show has been criticised by a number of organisations, including the End Violence Against Women campaign group, who condemned the BBC2 programme. End Violence Against Women is a coalition whose members include Amnesty International UK, Refuge and Women's Aid. Professor Liz Kelly, the campaign chairwoman, said: "The Verdict is guilty of trivialising rape. This is reality television that misses much of the reality of rape - for example, the fact that most women are raped by someone they know. With rape rarely dealt with at any length by broadcasters, The Verdict is a missed opportunity to show the facts on rape. The bleak truth about rape is that little support or justice exists for women in this country".

Others have criticised the decision of the programme producers for including Jeffrey Archer, as he would not currently be able to sit in a jury in real life due to his criminal conviction for perjury (and as a peer, because juries are selected from amongst those on the Electoral Register, he would not be considered for selection irrespective of his perjury conviction), and Stan Collymore who was accused of violence by his former girlfriend Ulrika Jonsson, in the jury. The programme is also viewed as having selected women jurors who were dominated by the male jurors, and many felt they were simply going along with these men's views. Defenders of the programme claim that - far from trivialising rape - the programme brought the difficult and complex issues surrounding rape trials into the public consciousness, and highlighted the reasons why the conviction rate for rape cases in the UK remains so low.

== The Jury ==
- Jeffrey Archer - author and former Conservative MP
- Honor Blackman - actress
- Stan Collymore - former footballer
- Jennifer Ellison - actress, singer and model
- Jacqueline Gold - businesswoman
- Alex James - musician
- Megaman - musician
- Dominic McVey - entrepreneur
- Patsy Palmer - actress
- Sara Payne - News of the World campaigner for the introduction of Sarah's Law
- Michael Portillo - former Conservative MP and Secretary of State for Defence. Chosen as foreman.
- Ingrid Tarrant - journalist, former wife of broadcaster Chris Tarrant
