= Editworks =

British post-production company

- Type: Post production
- Industry: Media
- Headquarters: London and Glasgow
- Key people: Graham Hutchings; Roger Cumner; Andrew Barrett (CEO)
- Website: www.editworks.co.uk

editworks was a post-production company located in The Hub, Pacific Quay, Glasgow. It specialised in long form broadcast programmes in a variety of genres, such as light entertainment, comedy, documentary, children's, factual and sport. It also did corporate work.

== Company info ==
=== History ===
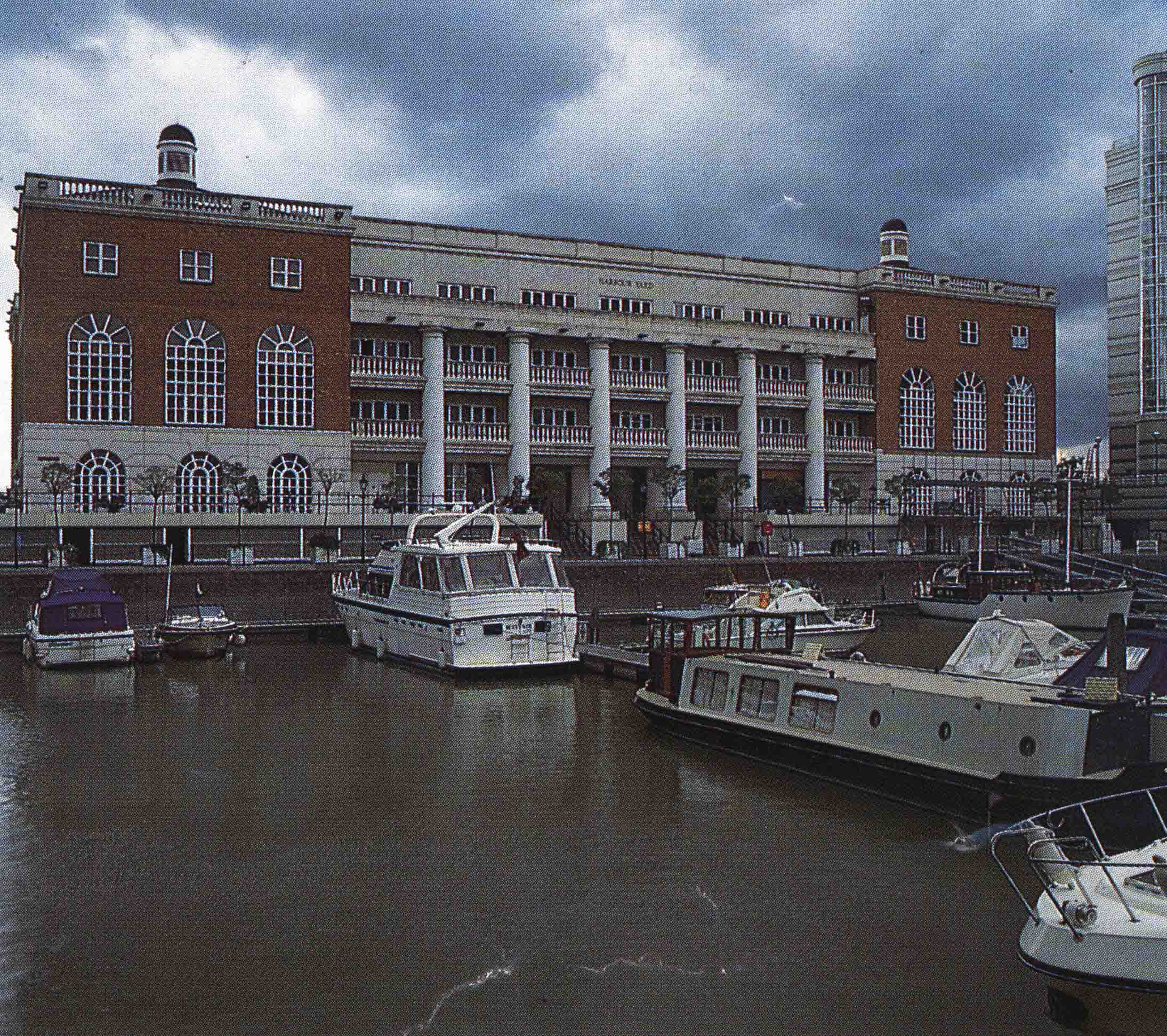
Chelsea Harbour 1992

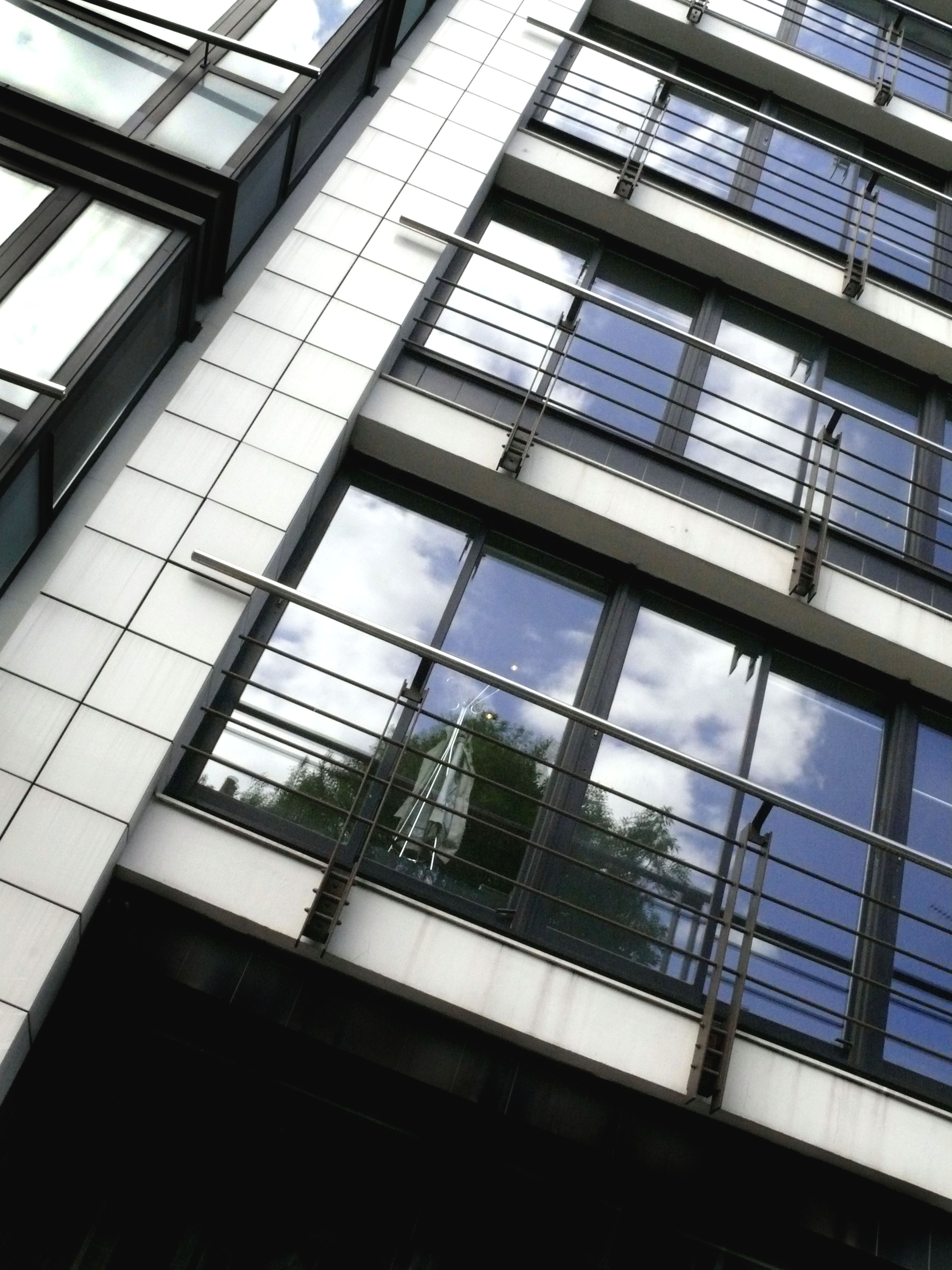
Charlotte Street – London Location

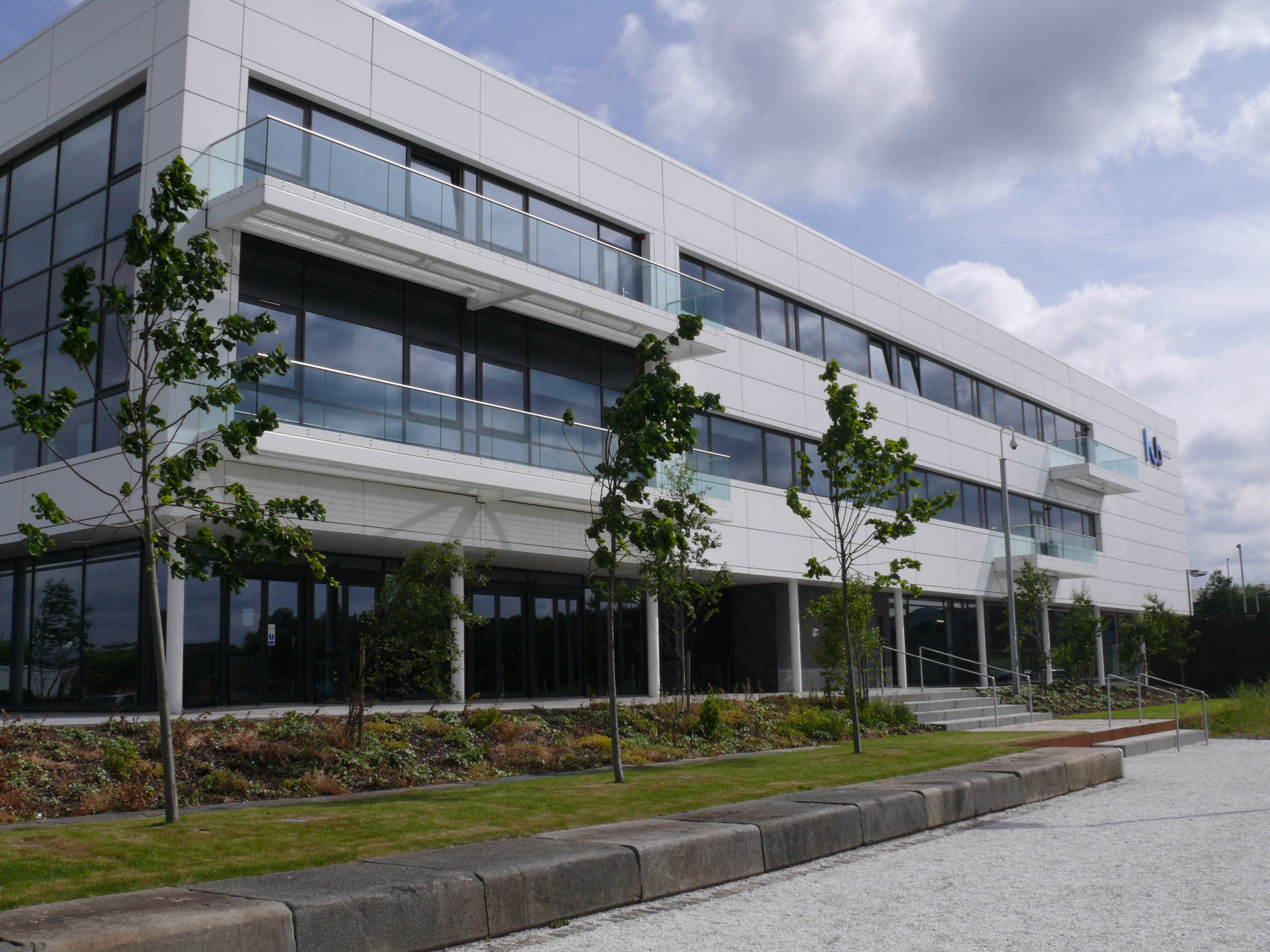
The Hub – Scotland Location

Editworks Locations

Editworks was founded in 1990 by Paul Smith, of Complete Communications, as a broadcast offshoot from Complete Video, which targeted mostly short form commercial work. It was originally based at Chelsea Harbour along with The Shooting Crew, which provided cameras and crew for location productions. Editworks was initially run by Geraint Owen, with Graham Hutchings and Perry Widdowson as editors. The Shooting Crew was run by Barry Noakes. Mark Sangster joined the company in 1992, from Thames Television. Originally, there were two linear online edit suites and one U-matic offline suite, based at Chelsea Harbour. Any extra sound work usually went to be finished at Complete Video in Covent Garden. In 1993, editworks used Avid for the first time to cut a Paul McCartney documentary and the non-linear system soon became the editors and Producers preferred tool. Expansion continued and in 1995 it was decided to build an audio dubbing suite at Chelsea and Adrian Smith joined the company as dubbing mixer from TVS. The U-matic offline suite became a third linear online and three dedicated Avid offline suites were built. Ex-BBC editor Steve Murray joined the company on 18 September 1995. During that period, James Thomas and Paul Richmond were promoted to editors from the Technical Staff. Following the success of Who Wants to Be a Millionaire?, Paul Smith decided to divest himself of editworks and invited the management team to buy the company from him. In 2000, Jim Boyers (then General Manager), together with Roger Cumner (Chief Engineer), Graham Hutchings, Mark Sangster, Adrian Smith and Perry Widdowson formed editworks 2000 ltd. The company was relocated from Chelsea Harbour to its present location in Charlotte Street, London. In 2005, Nick Dixon was promoted to on-line DS Editor as well as continuing to supervise the technical area along with Steve Willey, and Matt Ramsay joined as Dubbing Mixer. In 2008, a formal in-house editor training scheme commenced with three technical assistants, Brendon Blackshaw, Rebecca Bowker and John Foxen taking part. In 2010, Andrew Barrett (Ex-Heinz CEO) became Editworks' Company Chairman to assist the company's growth into the Scottish Television market. In June 2010, Editworks Scotland opened in The Hub, Pacific Quay, Glasgow. On 12 September 2012 Editworks 2000 Ltd entered administration. Editworks Scotland Ltd continued to trade until it entered administration in August 2019.

=== Early Shows ===
- Red Dwarf
- Talking Telephone Numbers
- The Detectives
- This is Your Life
- Strike It Rich
- Audiences with Shirley Bassey, Bob Downe, Ken Dodd and Ricky Martin
- Ruby Wax Meets
- Brass Eye
- Back Date
- The Hypnotic World of Paul McKenna
- Blankety Blank
- Commercial Breakdown
- Sean's Show
- Catchphrase
- All Rise for Julian Clary
- All Talk (Clive Anderson chat show)
- Play Your Cards Right
- The Day Today
- Reeves and Mortimer
- Heroes of Comedy
- The Tweenies
- Roadhog
- Disney's Night of Magic
- Cirque du Monde
- Fort Boyard
- The South Bank Show Special on Cliff Richard
- The Last Voyage of the Thistlegorm
- The Weakest Link
- Dog Eat Dog
- Friends Like These
- Paul Merton's History of The London Palladium
- Man O Man
- Night Fever
- Foot in the Door
- The Vicar of Dibley
- Delia Smith's Summer Collection
- My Hero
- Birds of a Feather
- Goodnight Sweetheart
- The Trial of Jasper Carrott
- Vic & Bob's Families at War
- The Jeremy Clarkson Chat Show
- Grudge Match
- The Laureus World Sports Awards
- Toyota Corporate Videos
- Hipnosis
- The Royal Variety Performance
- The Frank Skinner Show
- So Graham Norton

=== Recent Work ===
- The Graham Norton Show
- Harry Hill's TV Burp
- Al Murray's Happy Hour
- Baddiel and Skinner Unplanned
- The Frank Skinner Show
- Russell Howard's Good News
- Take Me Out
- Who Wants to Be a Millionaire?
- In It to Win It
- Who Dares Wins
- Eggheads
- The King is Dead
- National Television Awards
- The National Movie Awards
- The Colour of Money
- Dancing on Ice: The Tour
- Cliff Richard and The Shadows
- Jamie Saves Our Bacon
- American Idol Inserts
- You Are What You Eat
- Jack Dee in Siberia
- America Unchained
- Duel
- The Price is Right
- All Star Family Fortunes
- Kids Behind Bars

=== Recent clients ===
- 10 Star Entertainment
- 12 Yard
- 2Entertain
- 2waytraffic
- Alan King Productions
- Avalon TV Ltd
- Baby Cow Productions
- Baker Coogan Productions
- Banana Split Productions
- BBC
- BBC Scotland
- Big Bear Films
- Big Kahuna Productions
- British Forces Foundation
- Cactus TV
- Channel 4
- Channel 5
- Cineflix Productions
- CPL
- Darlow Smithson
- David Paradine Productions
- Diverse Media
- Endemol UK
- Eyeworks
- Fox Television
- Fox World UK
- Fremantle Media
- Fresh One Productions
- Gallowgate TV
- Granada Television
- Green Bay Media Ltd
- Hamma & Glamma Productions
- Hat Trick Productions
- Hotsauce TV
- Indigo Television
- ITN Factual
- ITV Sport
- ITV Studios
- Knight Ayton Management
- Kudos Film and Television
- Latitude Productions
- Lemon Mouse Ltd
- Magnum TV
- Mandate
- Medialink
- MEM Television
- Mentorn
- MTV Networks
- Objective Productions
- Octagon CSI
- On the Box Television
- One Arm Bandit Ltd Trading
- Open Mike Productions
- Optomen Television
- Paradine Productions
- Phil McIntytre Productions
- Pozzitive Television
- Pretzel Films
- Prime Suspects
- Princess Productions
- Rainmark Films
- Red Havok Media
- Rex Entertainment
- Ricochet Ltd
- Rockhopper TV
- Ruggie Media
- Shepperton Studios
- Shine Ltd
- Silver River Productions
- So Television
- Solutions TV
- Sony Pictures
- Spun Gold
- Talent Television Ltd
- talkbackTHAMES
- Target Entertainment
- The Prince's Trust
- The Walt Disney Company
- Tiger Aspect Productions
- TWI London
- Two Four Broadcast
- Universal Pictures
- Virgin Media
- Visual Voodoo
- Vixpix
- Warner Music
- Wised Up Ltd
- Zenith Entertainment
- Zip Television
- Zodiak Entertainment
- Zone Content
