= The Secret Barrister =

2018 book by The Secret Barrister

Stories of the Law and How It's Broken
- First edition cover
- Author: "The Secret Barrister"
- Cover artist: Two Associates
- Language: English
- Genre: non-fiction
- Publisher: Picador (imprint of Pan Macmillan)
- Publication date: 2018
- Publication place: England and Wales
- Media type: Print
- Pages: 376
- ISBN: 978-1-5098-4110-3

The Secret Barrister: Stories of the Law and How It's Broken is a 2018 book by an anonymous author with the pen name "The Secret Barrister". It is a critical first-hand account of the state of the criminal justice system in England and Wales. The subtitle is a play on words: the book is not about criminal lawbreaking, but about how the legal system is failing in its purpose.

== Author ==
The book's dustjacket states that the author, "The Secret Barrister", is a junior barrister practising criminal law before the courts of England and Wales. "The Secret Barrister" is also a blogger who in 2016 and 2017 was named Independent Blogger of the Year at the Editorial Intelligence Comment Awards. As of the book's publication date in March 2018 the author had a following on Twitter of nearly 88,000.

== Principal themes ==
The book is loosely structured to follow the life of a criminal case from magistrates' court, through to sentence and appeal. It mixes first-hand accounts of the author as advocate, acting at different times for the prosecution and the defence, with a discussion of how the system in practice fails to deliver justice on a daily basis: "Access to justice, the rule of law, fairness to defendants, justice for victims – those fine emblems which we purport to hold so dear – are each day incarnated in effigy, rolled out in the Crown and magistrates' courts and ritually torched".

The author argues that the public should be outraged by the chronic underfunding of the criminal justice system: "In every crumbling, decaying magistrates’ court and leaking Crown Court in the land, we see every day the law's equivalent of untreated, neglected patients on hospital trolleys. And every day it is met by a wall of silence".

The almost insuperable difficulties of ensuring that defendants are defended properly and prosecuted fairly are laid out: "The magistrates' court is the accident and emergency department of criminal justice: any moment a problem will walk through the door and the prosecutor will have to deal with it blind. Much prosecuting in the magistrates’ court takes the form of someone getting to their feet and presenting a case they have never set eyes on before".

The author is particularly critical of reforms to legal aid under LASPO (the Legal Aid, Sentencing and Punishment of Offenders Act 2012), called in the book "The Innocence Tax", under which a defendant can be wrongly accused of a crime by the state, denied legal aid and – when acquitted – find themselves out of pocket by tens or even hundreds of thousands of pounds in legal fees that the state will not repay.

The author also addresses policy issues, and argues that "a working criminal justice system, properly resourced and staffed by dedicated professionals ... serves to protect the innocent, protect the public and protect the integrity, decency and humanity of our society. This should be a societal baseline. Not a luxury".

The criminal justice system, the author argues, has suffered grievously in recent years from chronic underfunding. Its flaws are not those of the people who work within it, but are imposed from without: by the state. Each flaw is "either deliberately designed – such as the Innocence Tax, or the restriction of compensation for miscarriages of justice – or is the product of populist, tough-on-crime, anti-defendant posturing, or betrays warped spending priorities where politicians persuade voters that one penny off a pint of lager is a better investment than a working justice system".

The author calls for proper resources to be made available to the legal system to enable it to deliver justice, for better public legal education including case law and statutes that are freely available online to the public to counter widespread public complacency ("it will never happen to me"), and for better education for backbench MPs to enable them to challenge government ministers or Ministry of Justice officials who use fallacious or dissembling arguments to gain support for a particular change in the law.

The author pays tribute to the great dedication of the professionals who work within the system: the police officers, CPS prosecutors and caseworkers, defence solicitors, judges and magistrates, court staff, probation staff, prison officers and barristers. But "It is not the enemy within, betraying our ideals of justice ... but the enemy outside. Today's danger is not the actors, but the director; the state moving the pieces and pulling the strings ... The end result is the same. When we lose sight of justice, it unfastens and floats away, leaving us with a nominal legal system; but not a justice system".

== Parliament ==
On the day of the book's publication it was commended in the House of Commons by the shadow Leader of the House, Valerie Vaz: "I suggest that the Leader of the House and all members of the Government read the book by "The Secret Barrister", who states: 'Walk into any court in the land, speak to any lawyer, ask any judge and you will be treated to uniform complaints of court deadlines being repeatedly missed, cases arriving underprepared, evidence lost, disclosures of evidence not being made, victims made to feel marginalised and millions of pounds of public money wasted'".

The suggestion was taken up by the Criminal Bar Association and Young Legal Aid Lawyers who launched a campaign "Help us tell every MP criminal justice is in crisis" to fund the provision of a copy of the book for every Member of Parliament. The target of £10,000 was reached in three days, and it was reported that the book's publisher has pledged to match the donation.

== Critical reception ==
In the week after its publication in March 2018 the book was number 14 in Amazon's top 20 bestsellers list and reached The Sunday Times top five. It remained in the Sunday Times Top 10 Bestsellers list for twenty-four weeks.

The reception of professional book reviewers was uniformly positive.

Writing in The Observer, Alexander Larman called the book "terrifying and occasionally hilarious", an eye-opening if depressing account of the practice of law today. "The Secret Barrister" paints a picture of chaos in the courts, "from trials being endlessly postponed to unprepared barristers struggling through an underfunded and unfit system ... The author leaves us in no doubt that urgent reform is needed".

Hannah Summers, in The Guardian, noted that the author paints a damning picture of a legal system in which violent abusers walk free because evidence has gone missing and in which lawyers do hours of unpaid work to keep the system from collapse. According to the author, "the courts in England and Wales have been brought to their knees by government cuts and left so plagued by daily errors they are no longer fit for purpose".

For The Times, Imran Mahmood called the book both a lament and a celebration, carrying a message that is delivered with great skill. In reading it, he confessed to being surprised again and again at how damaged the criminal system is. The book tells us that "the liberty of the individual depends on us regarding the justice system as not just for criminals and victims but for all of us – it is the symbol of our nation's humanity". It is "a devastating indictment", said Daniel Finkelstein, "telling tale after tale of cases that are not prosecuted properly and are not tried properly".

Stephen Bates of the Literary Review called the book "a truly shocking account of the working of the English courts today". Fluently and engagingly written by an anonymous junior criminal barrister, according to Bates, the book tells of underfunded, dilapidated buildings, ever-lengthening trial delays and miscarriages of justice. Bates noted that "in a staggering 87 per cent of cases" audit trails show the disclosure of evidence to defence lawyers from the police or by the hassled, overworked and understaffed Crown Prosecution Service to be unsatisfactory.

In Criminal Law and Justice Weekly (CL&J), Jon Robins wrote that the book "shines an unflinching light on the nightmare of our courts", with chronic underfunding, staggering inefficiency and deathly managerialism being endemic within the system. He noted that austerity has hit the criminal justice system hard, and quoted the book's author as making it evident how dangerous a place the courts have become should you have the misfortune to end up there. That fate could happen to anyone, a thought that Robins considered "terrifying". He noted that the author lays bare the risk posed to all of us by a chronically underfunded justice system, politicians rarely having "to live with the consequences of their ill-thought out and occasionally cynical criminal justice policies".

In The Times publication The Brief, Catherine Baksi called the book a rallying cry against short-sighted governments and an apathetic public who luxuriate in the misplaced confidence that they will never be wrongly accused of a crime. The book's author, she wrote, sets out with clarity and eloquence in a dozen angry, passionate and frustrated chapters a damning verdict on a system "close to breaking point", and "lays bare the result of the wrong-headed, short-sighted, politically expedient and dishonest drive to prosecute and defend on the cheap". She cited the author's view that the inexcusable "bargain basement retail model of justice" is no more than "roulette framed as justice" where decisions are "inconsistent, irrational and, at times, plainly unlawful".

Theo Barclay set out for readers of The Daily Telegraph the author's principal allegation: "that successive governments have neglected and wilfully abused what was the jewel in the crown of the British constitution. The verdict? Guilty as charged". He noted that "Day-in, day-out, the innocent are punished and the guilty walk free because the system is underfunded, neglected, and failing those for whom it was designed to work". He expressed hope that "this excellent book will ... raise awareness of what has been, until now, a silent crisis".

In the New Law Journal, Chris Dale wrote that the book would "make you hate politicians", pointing out that the conditions described are the result of decisions which "are the product of more than just budget-cutting; ideology and ignorance play their part, along with a cynical calculation about who votes for what".

According to Mary Cowe for Counsel magazine, "this book is no rant. It is passionate advocacy of the highest standard, with all the sweary asides you can't say in court".

This is "One of the best legal books of modern times" according to Kapil Summan of Scottish Legal News: "A panoptic account of its subject, measured and forensic throughout. [It is] the signal in a world of noise on justice matters and – it is hoped – a spur to action".

== Nominations and awards ==
- Books Are My Bag Readers' Awards 2018: Winner in the non-fiction category.
- Waterstones Book of the Year 2018: nominee.
- British Book Awards, narrative non-fiction book of the year 2019: shortlisted.

== Subsequent books ==
In 2020 the Secret Barrister published Fake Law: The Truth About Justice in an Age of Lies. A third book, Nothing but the Truth, was published in 2022 and serialised as BBC Radio 4's Book of the Week in April. The author's first work of fiction (published under the pseudonym S. J. Fleet) was the 2025 novel The Cut Throat Trial.

== Bibliography ==
- Anonymous ("The Secret Barrister") (2018). Stories of the Law and How It's Broken. London: Macmillan (Pan Macmillan). ISBN 978-1-5098-4110-3.
