= Giochi24 =

Italian online betting organisation

Giochi24 S.r.l. is an Italian online betting organisation. It runs the official website, which offers lottery, bingo and casino games in Italy. The company was founded in 2008 and has the licence provided by the Italian Customs and Monopolies Agency (ADM).

== History ==
Giochi24 was registered in the Milan business register on 14 September 2009. Then the company received authorisation from the Italian gambling regulator, the Agenzia delle Dogane e dei Monopoli (ADM).

On 8 May 2018, Lottoland acquired a majority stake in Giochi24.

In 2024, Giochi24 reported revenue of about €5.6 million, compared with €5.5 million in 2023 and €5.1 million in 2022. Net profit of the company was about €490,000, and it has 9 employees. In 2025, Giochi24 has a revenue of about €5.9 million, which is 5% more than 2024, and net profit of about €541,000.

In June 2025, Giochi24 submitted an application for a remote gaming concession in the tender run by ADM, along with 45 other companies. In July 2025, the company was included in the list of operators, which were approved by the evaluation committee. On 17 September 2025, Giochi24 got the remote gaming concession as part of ADM's decision to grant 52 concessions to 46 operators.
