= Show Me the Telly =

- Genre: Game show
- Presented by: Richard Bacon
- Starring: Chris Tarrant (team captain)
- Country of origin: United Kingdom
- Original language: English
- No. of series: 1
- No. of episodes: 20

Production
- Running time: 60 minutes (inc. adverts)
- Production company: Shiver Productions

Original release
- Network: ITV
- Release: 25 November – 20 December 2013

Show Me the Telly is a British game show that aired on ITV from 25 November to 20 December 2013 as a winter replacement for Tipping Point and was hosted by Richard Bacon with Chris Tarrant as team captain.

== Format ==
The game consists of four rounds; the first three rounds see the 'TV Lovers' compete with the 'TV Legends' in order to win additional time for the fourth round; the fourth round then sees one of the 'TV Lovers' compete against the clock to win the daily £3,000 prize.

=== Switch On ===
The first round, Switch On, is a clip-based round. An on-the-buzzer question is asked to the team captains to determine the order of play. The teams then alternately pick from six programme categories given. Behind each category is a programme clip, and this is followed by three questions - though they are not necessarily always directly related to the clip shown (for instance, episode one featured a clip from Made in Chelsea followed by questions about The Valleys and The Only Way is Essex). Each player plays once in this round, and if the total score (out of nine questions given) achieved by the 'TV Lovers' exceeds that of the 'TV Legends', ten seconds are added to the time for the endgame; if the 'TV Legends' beat or equal the Lovers' score, no time is added.

=== Interactive Viewing ===
The second round is played in three parts, each worth five seconds added to the endgame if the 'TV Lovers' can better the score achieved by the 'TV Legends'.

The first part of the game sees a board of six options shown, and the teams alternately pick one of the options and give the appropriate answer. For instance, the six options may be TV catchphrases, and the players have to give the character or show that the phrase is associated with; other versions of this game have asked contestants to fill in missing words in programme titles, or to determine whether a programme title given really existed as a programme. If the Lovers get more right than the Legends, five seconds are added to the endgame. At the end of this game, a clip from one of the featured shows or stars is played.

The second round is a clips-based round: each team gets a clip and associated question, for instance working out which programme, personality or event a series of people taking part in vox pops are talking about, or determining which musician a Celebrity Stars in Their Eyes contestant is going to perform as. If the Lovers answer correctly and the Legends are wrong, five seconds are added to the endgame.

The third part of the round sees a TV programme, character or actor shown, along with nine potential answers to a given question, of which five are correct (for instance, an actor may be shown alongside nine programme titles, or a sitcom alongside nine potential episode titles, or a reality show alongside nine potential participants), and the contestants have to identify which five of the nine options are correct (in the manner of Wipeout). If the Lovers get more right than the Legends, five seconds are added to the endgame. At the end of each round, a clip from one of the featured shows or stars is screened.

=== Close Up ===
The third round, Close Up, is a head-to-head quiz game which sees each of the Lovers take on one of the Legends in a series of seven on-the-buzzer questions. Each Legend has a specialist subject related to their common TV role (for instance, Ricky Tomlinson's is 'comedy and drama' and Jeremy Kyle's is 'Daytime'; Chris Tarrant's is 'Entertainment' in all episodes). The playing Lover and Legend join Bacon at a podium and face an initial four questions on the subject at hand, then a clip is played, which is followed by a further three questions derived from the featured programme or personality. If the Lover gets more questions right than the Legend they are facing, five seconds is added to the endgame.

=== Screen Time ===
The final round does not feature the 'TV Legends'. In this round, one of the 'TV Lovers' is chosen by the team captain to sit in the 'telly chair' in front of the main screen and play for the £3,000 daily prize fund. The selected player has 60 seconds plus any time won in the earlier rounds to play through the endgame. The player has to answer, without help from their teammates, a sequence of eight questions correctly in order to access the 'Prime Time Question', and then answer this ninth question, all within the available time, in order to win the prize. Whilst playing through the eight-question sequence, the player has three 'lifelines' - 'Record', which can be used on any question, allows them to skip to the next question, though all recorded questions have to be dealt with before the Prime Time question is unlocked. 'Live Pause', which can be used only once, stops the game clock to allow the player up to ten seconds of conferring with the other Lovers on the current question; and 'Delete' allows one question of the sequence to be junked (this will often be used alongside the Record function, to allow the contestant to decide which question they find most troublesome.) The lifelines cannot be used on the Prime Time question. At the end of the round, Bacon runs through the answers of any question not correctly resolved by the player during their time, and closes the show. Unlike on some other quiz shows, such as Pointless, unwon prizes do not roll over to future programmes.
