= Joanna Greenberg =

The Honourable Mrs Justice Greenberg KC
- Royal coat of arms of the United Kingdom

Circuit judge
- In office 15 July 2014 – 29 November 2025
- Appointed by: Elizabeth II

Personal details
- Born: 28 November 1950 (age 75)

Joanna Elishever Gabrielle Greenberg (born 28 November 1950) is a British retired judge who sat on the circuit court.

== Biography ==
In 1972, she was called to the bar at Gray's Inn. In 1997, she was appointed to the police appeals tribunal. She was a judge involved in the trial of MEP Ashley Mote. In 2007, she appeared on the BBC programme The Verdict.

Greenberg was appointed a circuit judge by Queen Elizabeth II in 2014. During the COVID-19 pandemic, she ruled for a defendant with reported symptoms to appear in person. She retired from the circuit bench in 2025.
