= The Race (TV series) =

- Genre: Reality
- Presented by: Denise van Outen
- Country of origin: United Kingdom
- Original language: English
- No. of series: 1
- No. of episodes: 7

Production
- Running time: 60 minutes
- Production company: TownHouse Productions

Original release
- Network: Sky One
- Release: 6 November – 12 November 2006

The Race is a reality game show broadcast on Sky One in the UK from 6 to 12 November 2006, hosted by Denise van Outen.

== Format ==
The show pitted two teams of celebrities (one all-male, one all-female) against one another; each led by a professional Formula One racing driver in a battle of the sexes.

== Contestants ==
The Boys (team captain Eddie Irvine):

- Nigel Benn
- Les Ferdinand
- Gary Numan
- Brian Johnson
- Nick Moran

The Girls (team captain David Coulthard):

- Ms. Dynamite
- Jenny Frost
- Tamara Ecclestone
- Melissa Joan Hart
- Ingrid Tarrant
