= The Great Pretender (game show) =

- Genre: Game show
- Presented by: Chris Tarrant
- Country of origin: United Kingdom
- Original language: English
- No. of series: 1
- No. of episodes: 35

Production
- Running time: 60 minutes (inc. adverts)
- Production company: RDF Television

Original release
- Network: ITV
- Release: 5 November – 21 December 2007

The Great Pretender is a British game show that aired on ITV from 5 November to 21 December 2007 and is hosted by Chris Tarrant.

== Format ==
Six contestants compete through six rounds to accumulate money in a prize pot by answering questions. However, they are not told whether any of their answers are correct or incorrect, and the total in the pot is kept secret until after the sixth round. The correct answers and pot total are displayed on-screen for the viewer's benefit, and after every second round, the number of correct answers given by each contestant is also shown. A different category is used for all the questions in each round.

Each contestant receives a single question in the first round, and a pair of questions in the second. After the second round, the contestants secretly cast one vote apiece as to whom they want to eliminate from the game. If one contestant receives more votes than all others, they must leave the game with no winnings; if not, all contestants remain active.

Questions in the third round are asked on the buzzer, one for every contestant remaining. Each contestant then receives one question in turn during the fourth round, after which a second elimination vote is taken. The fifth and sixth rounds are played identically to the first and second, but no further votes are taken afterward.

Correct answers in the first two rounds add £75 to the pot; whenever a contestant is eliminated, the value of all subsequent questions doubles. The maximum potential pot total is £6,450.

After the sixth round, the host informs the contestants as to the final prize pot and sends them to a room to discuss which of them is the day's "Great Pretender" – the one who has given the most correct answers. They are allowed to bluff as they see fit. The host calls one contestant at a time back to the stage for a brief private talk and informs each one as to whether or not he/she is the Pretender. After these meetings are complete, he calls all of them to the stage and gives them a final 60 seconds to try and reach a consensus on the Pretender's identity. Once time is up, they each vote and the host publicly reveals the Pretender. If all of the other contestants have chosen correctly, they split the pot equally and the Pretender wins nothing. Otherwise, the Pretender wins the entire pot.

== Similar formats ==
The show's format is similar to that of Ant & Dec's PokerFace, in which contestants answer questions to build up prize money for themselves and then try to bluff one another out of the game in order to win the day's jackpot. On PokerFace, each contestant tries to make the others believe he/she has outperformed them in giving correct answers. The Great Pretender, conversely, requires contestants to do the opposite and present themselves as having done poorly in order to have a chance at the jackpot.
