= The Cut Throat Trial =

2025 novel by S. J. Fleet

- First edition cover
- Author: "The Secret Barrister", writing as S. J. Fleet
- Language: English
- Genre: Legal thriller
- Publisher: Picador (imprint of Pan Macmillan)
- Publication date: 2025
- Media type: Print
- Pages: 426

The Cut Throat Trial is a 2025 legal thriller by the anonymous author "The Secret Barrister", writing as S. J. Fleet. It is the author's first novel.

== Author ==
S. J. Fleet is the pen name of "The Secret Barrister", a junior barrister practising criminal law before the courts of England and Wales. Other books by the same author include The Secret Barrister: Stories of the Law and How It's Broken, Fake Law, and Nothing But The Truth.

== Plot ==
The story follows the trial of three seventeen-year-old boys in the English Crown Court, charged with the brutal murder of an older man. Each of the defendants, Craig, Arron and Jamal, advances a "cut-throat defence", namely that the murder was carried out by the other two. The trial is depicted through the perspectives and private reflections of the judge, the prosecuting counsel, one of the defence counsel, and two of the defendants.

== Critical reception ==
A pre-publication review for the Legal Action Group praised the novel's legal accuracy and authenticity, and considered the finale to be unexpectedly thought-provoking, raising the question of whether the outcome reflected the flawed characters or a flawed legal system.

In a review on the online platform Substack, the legal affairs commentator and journalist Joshua Rozenberg said that the novel "exposes some profound and necessary truths about a system that struggles against the odds to deliver the criminal justice on which we all rely."

Selecting the novel as Book of the Month, Mark Sanderson for The Times called it "a warty portrait of a crumbling judiciary" that rings horribly true, and praised the author's "hugely entertaining and disturbing debut."

== Bibliography ==
- Anonymous ("The Secret Barrister") (2018). Stories of the Law and How It's Broken. London: Macmillan (Pan Macmillan). ISBN 978-1-5098-4110-3.
