= Tarrant Lets the Kids Loose =

- Presented by: Chris Tarrant
- Country of origin: United Kingdom
- Original language: English
- No. of series: 1
- No. of episodes: 8

Production
- Camera setup: Multi-camera
- Running time: 60 minutes

Original release
- Network: Watch
- Release: 4 October – 22 November 2009

Tarrant Lets the Kids Loose is a television programme shown in 2009 on the UKTV channel Watch. It was produced by UKTV along with North One (a division of All3Media), and hosted by Chris Tarrant. It gave children aged three to six the chance to fulfil an ambition, by undertaking a task or challenge, such as shopping in a supermarket or running a sweet shop. The children believe they were completing the task by themselves, when in reality they are closely watched by their parents and filmed on hidden camera. The series began filming in front of a live studio audience in July 2009 and debuted on Watch on 4 October 2009.
