= It's Not What You Know =

2008 British game show

- Genre: Game show
- Created by: Kevin Ball
- Presented by: Chris Tarrant
- Country of origin: United Kingdom
- Original language: English
- No. of series: 1
- No. of episodes: 30

Production
- Running time: 60 minutes (inc. adverts)
- Production company: Granada in association with CTTV

Original release
- Network: Challenge
- Release: 28 April – 6 June 2008

It's Not What You Know (also known as Chris Tarrant's It's Not What You Know) is a game show hosted by Chris Tarrant, which aired on the British digital TV channel Challenge from 28 April to 6 June 2008.

== Gameplay ==
=== Phase one ===
The game is played by a team of two (friends, relatives, etc.). To start, each team is given three games to play, labelled A, B or C. To help them, one celebrity "expert" and their specialist subject from each game is displayed. The players must choose one of the games and, once they have, the other four celebrities and their specialist subjects in the chosen game are revealed. Each game contains 15 questions with each question being specific to one of the celebrity's specialist subject.

=== Questions and answers ===
Each question comes up with four possible answers; these answers are shown to all but the specialist celebrity. After the right answer is displayed (the players' answer are not recorded), the players then decide on which celebrity was "stumped" (got the question wrong; there were at least four occasions of the specialist celebrity being stumped). Once the players have chosen, their chosen celebrity gets "locked in". Afterwards, the celebrities who got the question correctly and those were stumped are identified. Following, the players' chosen celebrities are identified; if the celebrity chosen was one of the non-specialist celebrities and were stumped, the players’ jackpot increases by the prize amount of the level they are on. If they were the specialist celebrity and were stumped, the players also move up a level with a potential for winning higher amounts of money. The studio changes colour to reflect this (level 1 is purple, level 2 is yellow, level 3 is blue, level 4 is green and level 5 is left unknown because no couple has reached that point in the game).

Level 1 is played for £1,000 per question. This amount increases through each level to £5,000, £10,000, £15,000 and £25,000 (per question).

=== Back to zero ===
If the players make an incorrect guess (meaning that their chosen celebrity, specialist or non-specialist, got the question right), they lose what they have accumulated so far. They will still be allowed to continue playing at their current prize level, restarting their jackpot from zero. However, if they make an incorrect guess twice in a row, they'll go down a level (unless they are still on the first level).

=== Passing ===
If at any point the players are uncertain of correctly guessing a stumped celebrity, they can pass on the question they are on and keep their winnings safe (they are only allowed to pass on a question once, though), but they cannot pass on Question 15 (the last question) because "that would be too easy", stated by Chris Tarrant.

=== Final phase ===
The players then get offered between 20% and 50% of how much they had amassed in the game after Question 14. If the players accept the offer, they'll take home with them the amount of money offered and still go on to Question 15, just to see what would have happened. If the players reject the offer, they'll go on to Question 15 and try to make a correct guess. If they select a stumped celebrity, their jackpot goes up by £1,000, £5,000, £10,000, £15,000 or £25,000 (depending on which ever level they were on) and the players take home with them whatever they have banked. If they select a celebrity who answered the question correctly, they'll leave empty-handed.

== Celebrity Experts ==
- Johnny Ball
- Michael Buerk
- Garry Bushell
- Kelly Cates
- Sarah Cawood
- Giles Coren
- Dougie Donnelly
- Mark Eccleston
- Jenni Falconer
- Frederick Forsyth
- Neil Fox
- Muriel Gray
- Ian Hyland
- Joe Inglis
- Dr Hilary Jones
- Miranda Krestovnikoff
- Rod Liddle
- Carol McGiffin
- Lawrence McGinty
- Ray Mears
- Brian Moore
- Marc Morris
- Nina Myskow
- Nicholas Owen
- Brian Paddick
- John Parrott
- Prof. Colin Pillinger
- Ingrid Seward
- Brian Sewell
- Brian Turner
- Reggie Yates
- Tim Yeo
- Andrew Motion
