= Millie Clode =

British television presenter

- Born: Camilla Clode; 1 September 1982 (age 43); London, England
- Occupation: TV presenter
- Spouse: Kingsley Ford (m. 2011)

Camilla Clode (born 1 September 1982) is an English former television presenter. She worked for Sky Sports News and also provided statistical analysis on ITV's The Colour of Money.

== Education ==
Clode attended St Leonards School in St Andrews before graduating from Oxford Brookes University with a 2:1 in English Studies.

== Career ==
Her initial forays into the world of presenting included hosting a show on Oxford Brookes Radio Station Obsession FM and presenting the Great Big British Quiz for Quiz TV.

She co-hosted The Colour of Money on ITV in early 2009. In July 2010, she presented The Poker Lounge on Channel 4.

== Personal life ==
She married Kingsley Ford in February 2011.
