= Ingrid Tarrant =

English television presenter

- Born: Ingrid Dupre; 15 October 1954 (age 71); Elstree, Hertfordshire, England
- Occupation: Television personality
- Years active: 2000–2010
- Known for: This Morning
- Spouses: Tony Walsh (m. 1980; div. 1985); Chris Tarrant (m. 1991; div. 2007)
- Children: 4, including Toby

Ingrid Dupre Tarrant (born 15 October 1954) is a British television personality and former wife of Chris Tarrant. She has appeared on such programmes as TV Mail, Wish You Were Here? and This Morning. She has also appeared on a special version of What Not to Wear where she received a makeover from fashion advisors Trinny and Susannah.

She had two children with her first husband, Tony Walsh, and two with her second husband Chris Tarrant, including Toby. Her marriage with Chris crumbled in 2006 after the exposure of his adultery, she received considerable media attention, and she has since gone on to appear in a number of reality television programmes which include The Race, The Verdict, Deadline and Celebrity Coach Trip partnered with friend Carol Harrison.

== See also ==
- Capital Radio
