= Toby Tarrant =

Radio presenter and broadcaster

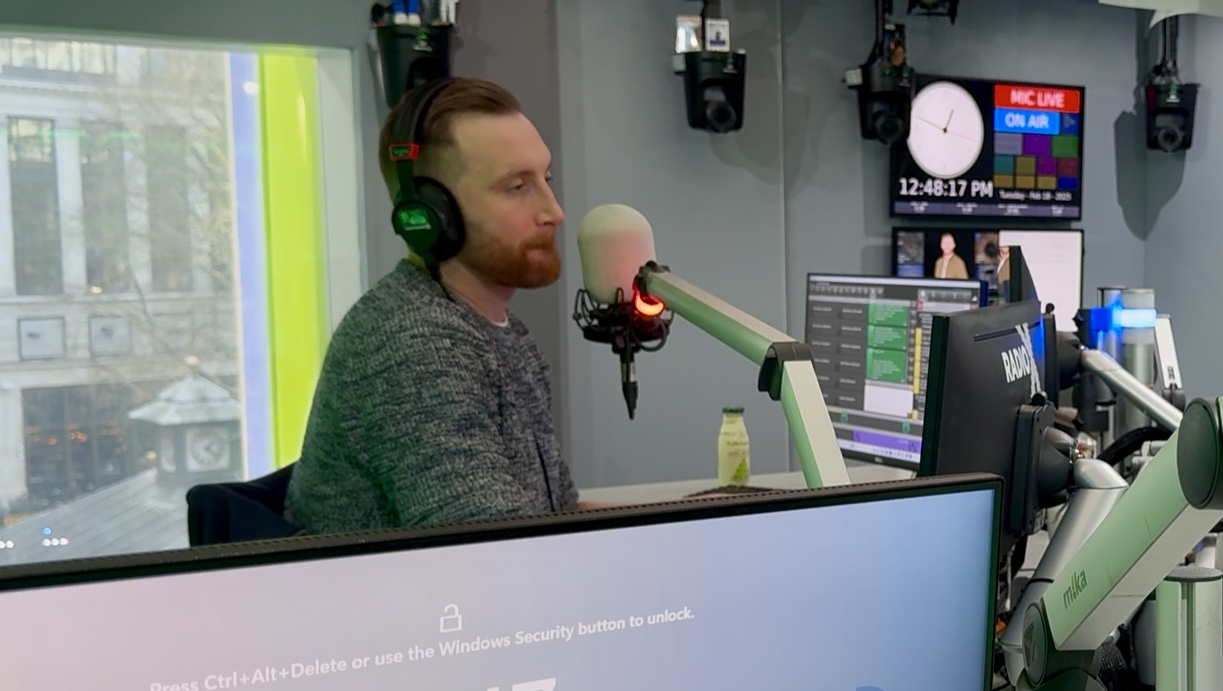
- Toby Tarrant in 2025 at Radio X during his 10am to 1pm Show
- Born: Tobias Charles Tarrant; 29 October 1991 (age 34); Chertsey, Surrey, England
- Occupation: Broadcaster
- Years active: 2014–present
- Spouse: Pippa Taylor (m. 2022)
- Parents: Chris Tarrant (father); Ingrid Dupre (mother)
- Website: Radio X Profile

Tobias Charles Tarrant (born 29 October 1991) is an English radio broadcaster on Radio X.

== Early life ==
Tarrant is the youngest son of broadcaster Chris Tarrant, who previously presented the breakfast show on Capital FM between 1987 and 2004, and his former wife Ingrid.

Tarrant attended Parkside School and Reed's School in Cobham, Surrey.

== Career ==
Tarrant started his national radio broadcasting career on Capital FM, presenting the early breakfast show in 2014.

In October 2016, he moved to the same time slot on Radio X, presenting from 4am to 6:30am. He also began covering The Chris Moyles Show when Chris Moyles was on leave.

Due to his profile being raised after increasing the listener figures on his early show by 29%, and also by appearing on Moyles' show, Tarrant moved to the mid-morning slot (10am-1pm) in April 2018, taking over from Jack Saunders. The first hour of the show is the request hour.

In October 2018, Tarrant won an episode of the BBC One show Pointless with fellow Radio X DJ Johnny Vaughan (who replaced his father on the Breakfast Show at Capital).

In May 2025, Tarrant appeared on an episode of Katie Piper 's Weekend Escapes (Series 1, Episode 3) - the episode featured Tarrant participating in making cocktails and some Belly Dancing whilst wearing fairy wings.

== Personal life ==
Tarrant is married to Pippa Taylor, the former executive producer of The Chris Moyles Show. Taylor announced the pair's engagement on The Chris Moyles Show on 20 July 2020. They married on 16 September 2022.

Tarrant ran the London Marathon for the charity "Make Some Noise" in 2018, achieving a time of 04:20:27. He raised over £31,000 for his efforts. One of the main reasons for the high total was due to his agreement with Moyles that he would cycle around Leicester Square naked if he raised over £30,000. In 2024, he rode a unicorn pedalo, again for Global's Make Some Noise, this time raising over £250,000.
