= Chris Tarrant: Extreme Railways =

British television documentary series

- Genre: Travel documentary
- Presented by: Chris Tarrant
- Theme music composer: David Lowe, Simon Darlow
- Country of origin: United Kingdom
- Original language: English
- No. of series: 6
- No. of episodes: 28

Production
- Running time: 45 minutes

Original release
- Network: Channel 5
- Release: 5 December 2012 – 3 December 2020

Chris Tarrant: Extreme Railways, also known as Chris Tarrant: Extreme Railway Journeys, is a British television documentary series presented by Chris Tarrant for Channel 5. In the series, Tarrant travels worldwide to visit railways that go through the harshest terrain. He also travels on railways that are some of the world's oldest and most scenic, and finds out their history. Six series of the programme aired from 5 December 2012 to 3 December 2020.

== History ==
Chris Tarrant was approached by Channel 5 to present three railway documentary episodes in 2012, and the result was Tarrant's trips to Congo, Australia and India, under the name Extreme Railways. Radio and television composers David Lowe and Simon Darlow provided music for the series. Three years later, a second series was aired, titled Chris Tarrant: Extreme Railway Journeys. As of 2020, six series have been produced.

On 12 March 2014, it was reported that Tarrant had suffered a mini stroke during a flight from Bangkok to London on 1 March 2014 while returning from overseas shooting for the programme. Upon landing, he was rushed to Charing Cross Hospital where doctors did emergency surgery to remove a blood clot from his right leg.

== Series overview ==
Series	Episodes	Originally released	
Series	Episodes	First released	Last released
1	3	5 December 2012	19 December 2012
2	6	1 October 2015	5 November 2015
3	5	31 October 2016	19 December 2016
4	5	6 November 2017	21 October 2018
5	4	7 January 2019	28 January 2019
6	5	25 November 2019	3 December 2020

== Episodes ==
=== Season 1 (2012) ===
No. overall	No. in season	Title	Original release date
1	1	"Congo's Jungle Railway"	5 December 2012
2	2	"Australia's Outback Railway"	12 December 2012
3	3	"India's Monsoon Railway"	19 December 2012

=== Season 2 (2015) ===
No. overall	No. in season	Title	Original release date
4	1	"Railroad to Mandalay"	1 October 2015
5	2	"Crossing the Andes"	8 October 2015
6	3	"One Way Ticket to Siberia"	15 October 2015
7	4	"Slow Train to Guantanamo Bay"	22 October 2015
8	5	"The Great Japanese Train Ride"	29 October 2015
9	6	"The Railway That Created Canada"	5 November 2015

=== Season 3 (2016) ===
No. overall	No. in season	Title	Original release date
10	1	"Ice Train to Nowhere"	31 October 2016
11	2	"Night Train to Patagonia"	7 November 2016
12	3	"The Diamond Railway"	14 November 2016
13	4	"Trans-Caucasus Railway"	21 November 2016
14	5	"On the Xmas Express"	19 December 2016

=== Season 4 (2017–18) ===
No. overall	No. in season	Title	Original release date
15	1	"Destination Timbuktu"	6 November 2017
16	2	"Crossing The Baltics"	13 November 2017
17	3	"Return To Yugoslavia"	20 November 2017
18	4	"Railway To The Holy Land"	27 November 2017
19	5	"Railways of the Holocaust"	28 October 2018

=== Season 5 (2019) ===
No. overall	No. in season	Title	Original release date
20	1	"Conquering the Alps"	7 January 2019
21	2	"The Train in Spain"	14 January 2019
22	3	"A Railway Too Far?"	21 January 2019
23	4	"The Reunification Express"	28 January 2019

=== Season 6 (2019) ===
No. overall	No. in season	Title	Original release date
24	1	"Railways of the Western Front"	25 November 2019
25	2	"Last Train to Transylvania"	2 December 2019
26	3	"The Eastern Express"	9 December 2019
27	4	"Crossing the Emerald Isle"	16 December 2019
28	5	"The Lunatic Express"	3 December 2020

== Home media ==
So far, series 1 to 6 of Chris Tarrant: Extreme Railways have been released on DVD.
