= Man O Man (British game show) =

- Genre: Game show
- Presented by: Chris Tarrant
- Country of origin: United Kingdom
- Original language: English
- No. of series: 2
- No. of episodes: 22

Production
- Running time: 60 minutes (inc. adverts)
- Production companies: Reg Grundy Productions and Anglia (1996); Grundy (1998–9)

Original release
- Network: ITV
- Release: 4 May 1996 – 7 August 1999

Related
- Man O Man

Man O Man was a British game show that aired on ITV from 4 May 1996 to 7 August 1999 and was hosted by Chris Tarrant.

== Format ==
Each show had ten men compete in front of audience of 400 women, in a spoof of male beauty pageants. They would compete in a series of challenges such as posing in swimming trunks, or trying to impress the women with the best pickup lines. The audience then voted for which one they liked the best, with a number of eliminations in each round, and each man eliminated was pushed into a swimming pool by one of the show's models. The last man left standing won a motorcycle.

== Transmissions ==
| Series | Start date | End date | Episodes |
|---|---|---|---|
| 1 | 4 May 1996 | 3 August 1996 | 12 |
| Specials | 8 August 1998 | 15 August 1998 | 2 |
| 2 | 12 June 1999 | 7 August 1999 | 8 |
