= Brookvale Oval =

Sports venue in Brookvale, New South Wales, Australia

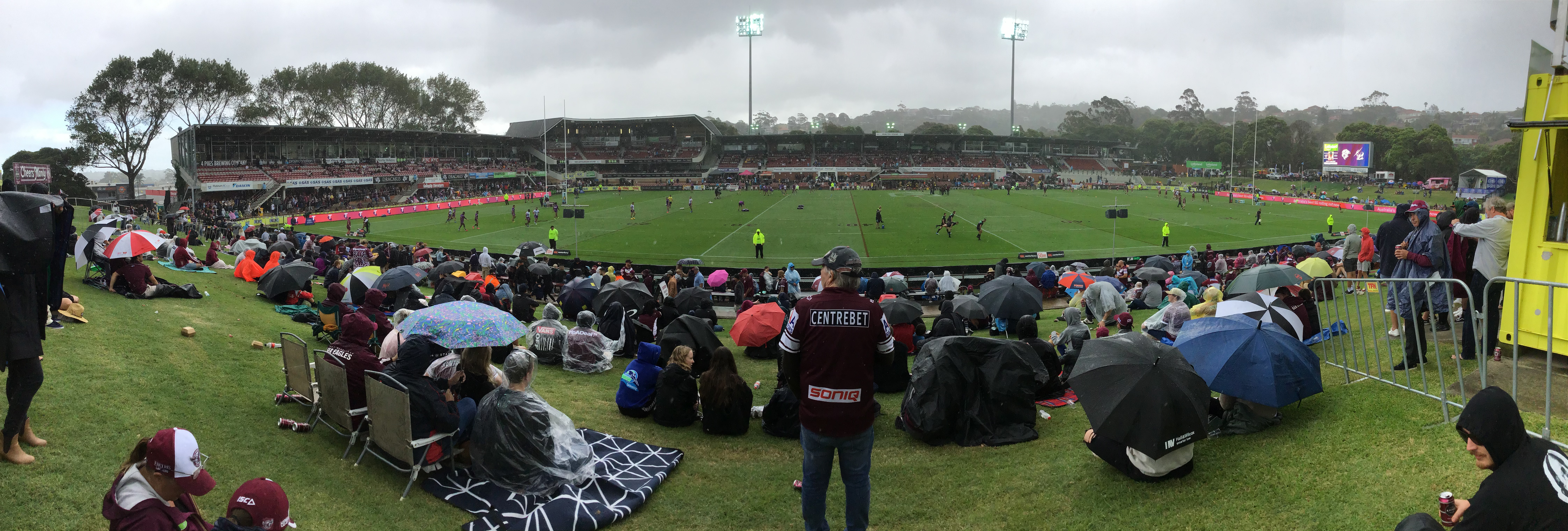
- Brookvale Oval in March 2020
- Interactive map of Brookvale Oval
- Former names: Lottoland (2017–2021)
- Location: Pittwater Road, Brookvale, New South Wales
- Coordinates: 33°45′36″S 151°16′24″E
- Owner: Northern Beaches Council
- Capacity: 18,000
- Surface: Grass
- Record attendance: 27,655 (Manly vs Parramatta, 31 August 1986)
- Public transit: Warringah Mall

Construction
- Opened: 1911

Tenants
- Manly Warringah Sea Eagles (NSWRL/ARL/NRL) (1947–1999, 2003–present); North Harbour Rays (NRC) (2014); Northern Eagles (NRL) (2000–2002)

Brookvale Oval, known fornaming rights as 4 Pines Park, is a stadium located in the Sydney suburb of Brookvale. It is primarily used for rugby league as the home ground of the Manly Warringah Sea Eagles in the National Rugby League (NRL).

Established in 1911, the site originally served as a public recreation reserve and showground. Rugby league became its primary use from 1947, and the venue has since hosted more than 760 top‑grade premiership matches. The ground has since undergone multiple redevelopment phases, including the reshaping of the playing field in the early 1970s, the construction of the Ken Arthurson Stand in 1995, and the completion of the 3,000‑seat Bob Fulton Stand and Centre of Excellence in 2022. The stadium's current capacity stands at 18,000 spectators. Locally based craft beer company 4 Pines Brewing Company has owned and operated the naming rights since 2021.

== History ==
=== Early development (pre–1911) ===
The area now known as Brookvale was originally called Greendale in the late nineteenth century. The suburb later adopted the name Brookvale after “Brookvale House”, the residence built by early land grantee William Francis Parker.

In the early 1900s, local resident Dan Farrell constructed a stone house named Inverness on nearby land. The surrounding paddocks, informally known as Farrell’s Paddock, were used for community gatherings, including an event in April 1910 celebrating the extension of the Manly tram line to Brookvale.

=== Establishment of Brookvale Park (1911) ===
In 1911, the New South Wales Government and Warringah Shire Council agreed to acquire land for a public recreation reserve adjacent to the Shire Offices. A significant portion of the site was donated by local landowner Jane Malcolm (later Jane Try) under the condition that it be used solely for public recreation. The reserve was formally opened as Brookvale Park later that year.

=== Showground era (1911–1930s) ===
During its first decades, Brookvale Park functioned primarily as a showground. The Brookvale Show was established in 1921 and featured agricultural, horticultural and sporting displays. The park also hosted school sports days, Arbor Day tree plantings, and community celebrations such as Empire Day.

=== World War II ===
During World War II, Brookvale Park was used by the Australian Defence Force for training and drill activities.

=== Construction of Centre of Excellence and grandstand ===
In February 2019 it was announced Brookvale Oval would receive a $36.1 million facelift including a 3000-seat grandstand and centre of excellence after securing a Government of New South Wales grant. The facility, which will be located at the northern end of the oval, began construction in October 2020 and was funded by the NSW Government (contributing $20 million) the Federal Government ($12.5 million) and Manly Sea Eagles ($600,000). Construction by ADCO Constructions began in March 2021.

== Attendance ==
The single record attendance for any event at Brookvale was set during a regular season clash between the Manly-Warringah Sea Eagles and Parramatta Eels on 31 August 1986 which drew 27,655 fans. Given changes to the configuration of the ground undertaken in the 1990s it is unlikely that this record will ever be broken. The game is officially declared sold out when crowds creep around the 20–22 000 mark, although no official cut-off is continuously used.

In 2006, the ground saw its largest average attendance over an entire season, with an average of 15,484 patrons watching each of the club's 11 matches played there. Since the club started playing in 1947, over seven million spectators have visited the ground.

In 2013, the ground was marred by claims of racism and aggressive behaviour by fans, including recent taunting and racist slurs towards the wife and young daughter of Kiwis and Bulldogs forward Frank Pritchard.

The largest known attendance per decade at Brookvale Oval are as follows:

- 1947–49 – 3,600* – Manly vs Balmain, Round 6, 1947
- 1950–59 – 10,908* – Manly vs Western Suburbs, Round 6, 1958
- 1960–69 – 13,644 – Manly vs Newtown, Round 1, 1964
- 1970–79 – 25,876 – Manly vs Balmain, Round 11, 1976
- 1980–89 – 27,655 – Manly vs Parramatta, Round 26, 1986
- 1990–99 – 26,168 – Manly vs Canberra, Round 22, 1994
- 2000–09 – 20,163 – Manly vs Canterbury, Round 25, 2006
- 2010–19 – 20,510 – Manly vs South Sydney, Round 7, 2013
- 2020–29 – 17,385 – Manly vs Wests, Round 9 - 2022 / Manly vs Sydney, Round 18, 2023 / Manly vs Parramatta, Round 8, 2024

* Attendance records for most games played at Brookvale Oval not known from 1947 to 1956.

== Top 10 attendances ==
Year	Round	Date	Result	Attendance
1986	26	31 August	Parramatta Eels def. Manly Warringah Sea Eagles 22–6	27,655
1994	22	28 August	Canberra Raiders def. Manly Warringah Sea Eagles 21–18	26,168
1976	11	30 May	Manly Warringah Sea Eagles def. Balmain Tigers 14–0	25,876
1995	11	4 June	Manly Warringah Sea Eagles def. Brisbane Broncos 23–4	25,549
1987	13	24 May	Manly Warringah Sea Eagles def. Balmain Tigers 48–14	25,448
1993	16	18 July	Manly Warringah Sea Eagles def. North Sydney Bears 26–10	24,381
1983	10	1 May	Parramatta Eels def. Manly Warringah Sea Eagles 24–6	24,156
1982	19	4 July	Manly Warringah Sea Eagles def. Parramatta Eels 31–14	24,031
1978	1	26 March	Manly Warringah Sea Eagles def. St George Dragons 19–5	23,168
1990	16	15 July	Manly Warringah Sea Eagles def. Balmain Tigers 24–10	23,102

== Configuration for Sea Eagles games ==
Seating at the ground is in one of three linked grandstands. The Jane Try stand houses those season-ticket holders of the Manly-Warringah Sea Eagles and is located on the western side of the ground. The Jane Try Stand opened in 1971 and was built at a cost of $250,000.

The second grandstand addition to Brookvale Oval was the Southern Stand built in 1979, located at the Southern end of the ground. The Southern Stand houses some corporate facilities. This stand was renamed at the end of the 2008 season. It became the Fulton-Menzies Stand after club legends Bob Fulton and Steve Menzies. The name was again changed in 2022 with the opening of the Manly Centre of Excellence and the 3,000 seat Bob Fulton Stand fronting it at the northern end of the ground. The Fulton-Menzies Stand became the Lyons-Menzies Stand honouring the combination between Cliffy Lyons and Steve "Beaver" Menzies who scored many of his early tries running off the Sea Eagles mercurial 5/8.

The third structural addition to the ground is the Ken Arthurson Stand. The stand was officially opened on Sunday 14 June 1995. It was built at a cost of $3.3 million and seats 1,250 people. The stand is named for the greatest administrator in the club's history and contains corporate boxes as well as reserved seating for fans. The Ken Arthurson Stand is located in the south-western corner of the ground between the Jane Try and Fulton-Menzies stands. In its early days it was often referred to as the link stand as it linked the two grandstands at the ground.

The fourth structural addition to the ground which opened in 2022 was the aforementioned, 3,000 seat Bob Fulton Stand replacing the old Family Hill at the north end of the ground. Fronting the club's new $36.1 million Centre of Excellence. Construction of the new stand and centre began in 2020 and was officially opened in 2022 (construction was delayed by the COVID-19 pandemic).

There is some limited general admission seating around the perimeter concourse of the ground with a depth of between 3 and 5 rows. Other general admission areas include the Eastern Hill, which spans the length of the eastern side of the ground.

Ground improvements over the off-season following the 2011 premiership win included extending the Jane Try Stand to run the full length of the western touchline and the inclusion of corporate facilities. Delays in the completion of these works forced the Sea Eagles to play away for the first 5 games of the 2012 season.

== Other uses ==
=== Rugby union ===
In 2014, the North Harbour Rays announced Brookvale Oval as their home ground for the inaugural National Rugby Championship season.

The NSW Waratahs played their 2019 season opener Super Rugby game against New Zealand's Hurricanes on 16 February 2019 and attracted a sellout 17,111 crowd. The Waratahs played preseason matches at Brookvale Oval against the New Zealand's Highlanders in 2017 and the Melbourne Rebels in 2018.

=== Soccer ===
In June 2014, A-League club Central Coast Mariners announced its intention to play at least one home game per season at Brookvale Oval. The Mariners scheduled the 2014–15 round 16 match against Adelaide United at Brookvale Oval, however it was relocated to the Mariners normal home ground Central Coast Stadium due to the poor condition of the grass at Brookvale Oval.

== Playing surface ==
Brookvale Oval turf cover is predominantly Kikuyu grass.

In March 2019 Northern Beaches Council CEO Ray Brownlee said "Council is committed to providing as safe a playing surface as possible at Brookvale Oval and has continued to invest around $160,000 each year in its ongoing maintenance". Council in its draft 2019–20 budget, allocated $1.2 million to upgrade the playing surface at Brookvale Oval.

This was originally to commence at the end of 2019 Sea Eagles season, but will now delay this resurfacing project until the end of the 2020 NRL playing season. This will allow sufficient time to consider other key factors such as optimal surface positioning and levels for the Centre of Excellence and Sea Eagles home game scheduling towards the back end of the 2020 season and front end of the 2021 season.
