= Chris Tarrant =

English broadcaster (born 1946)

Chris Tarrant OBE
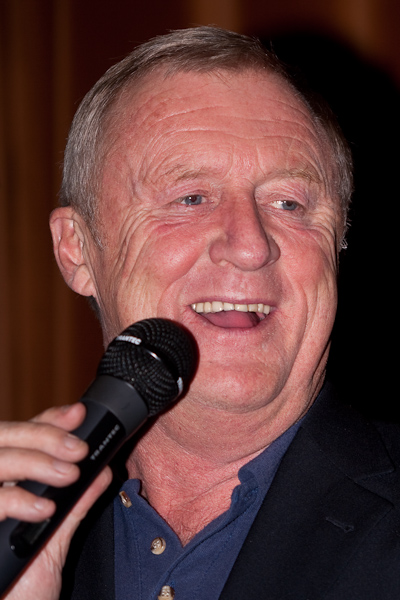
- Tarrant doing stand-up comedy in 2009
- Born: Christopher John Tarrant; 10 October 1946 (age 80); Reading, Berkshire, England
- Education: King's School, Worcester; University of Birmingham
- Occupations: Broadcaster; comedian; television personality
- Years active: 1972–2024
- Known for: Tiswas; Who Wants to Be a Millionaire? Chris Tarrant: Extreme Railways
- Spouses: Sheila Robertson (m. 1976; div. 1982); Ingrid Dupre-Walsh (m. 1991; div. 2007)
- Partner: Jane Bird (2008–present)
- Children: 4, including Toby

Christopher John Tarrant (born 10 October 1946) is an English retired broadcaster, television personality, radio DJ, and comedian. He is best known for presenting the ITV children's television show Tiswas from 1974 to 1981 and the game show Who Wants to Be a Millionaire? from its inception in 1998 until 2014.

Tarrant's career began in 1972 when he was hired by the television broadcaster ATV. He presented ATV Today, a current affairs programme serving the Midlands area of England, until 1982. Tarrant rose to prominence after becoming a co-host on Tiswas, the children's television show broadcast on Saturday mornings from 1974 to 1981. Tarrant was a member of the Four Bucketeers group, whose single "Bucket of Water Song" reached No. 26 in the UK Singles Chart in 1980. In January 1982, along with Bob Carolgees, John Gorman, Randolph Sutherland and Lenny Henry, Tarrant launched a late-night show, O.T.T. ("Over the Top"), thought of as an "adult" version of Tiswas, which despite being short-lived, was popular among adults. His co-host Sally James presented the concurrent and final series of Tiswas alone.

Tarrant was a Capital Radio host from 1984 to 2004, presenting the early-morning show Capital Breakfast. The show was highly popular, increasing Capital Radio's audience share in London. Tarrant presented the ITV game show Who Wants to Be a Millionaire? from 1998 to 2014, while also providing audio recordings for some console games, and a tabletop game made by Tiger Electronics based on the show. He recorded a total of 592 episodes across 30 series, in which five contestants won the top cash prize of £1 million. In 2012, Tarrant began a travel documentary series, Chris Tarrant: Extreme Railways, with locations including the Congo-Ocean Railway, the Ghan across Australia and the Konkan Railway in India.

Tarrant's other television credits include Tarrant on TV, a programme that shows clips featuring a number of unusual television programmes from around the world, and Tarrant Lets the Kids Loose, a programme which gives three- to six-year-olds the chance to fulfil their greatest ambitions in the adult world. He also hosted several other game shows, including It's Not What You Know and The Colour of Money, The Main Event 1993. Tarrant was appointed an OBE in 2004 for his charity work, in particular his campaigning on behalf of disadvantaged children. In 2006, he was ranked number 38 in ITV's poll of TV's 50 Greatest Stars. Tarrant announced his retirement in December 2024, after 52 years in television.

== Early life ==
Christopher John Tarrant was born on 10 October 1946 in Reading, England, to Basil Avery Tarrant (1919–2005) and Joan, née Cox. His father, who would become marketing and sales director of biscuit tin manufacturer Huntley & Bourne & Stevens, had joined a territorial unit of the Royal Army Ordnance Corps in 1936 and was among those evacuated from Dunkirk in the retreat of May 1940. He was also active in the Normandy landings. He ended his military career, having joined the Royal Berkshire Regiment, with the rank of Major.

Tarrant was educated as a boarder in Choir House at the King's School, Worcester from 1960 to 1964. He represented the school at hockey and cricket and gained A, B and D grades at A-level in English, history and ancient history. He then studied English at the University of Birmingham, graduating in 1967.

Tarrant worked as a schoolteacher and also briefly as a film director for the Central Office of Information before joining ATV in 1972 as a newsreader on ATV Today, a current affairs programme serving the Midlands area of England, until 1982.

== Career ==
=== Tiswas and O.T.T. ===
Tarrant rose to prominence after becoming a co-presenter on Tiswas, a children's television show broadcast on a Saturday morning from January 1974 to March 1981, alongside Sally James. It also featured the young Lenny Henry and occasionally Jim Davidson together with Bob Carolgees and his puppet, Spit the Dog. John Gorman, former member of The Scaffold, was also a presenter.

In 1982, along with Bob Carolgees, John Gorman, Randolph Sutherland and Lenny Henry, Tarrant hosted the short-lived Saturday late-night show O.T.T. ("Over the Top"), which was billed as an adult version of Tiswas but was not such a success. Despite being short-lived, the show was popular amongst adults. After this, Tarrant did a stint on the breakfast television station TV-am. Sally James presented the concurrent and final series of Tiswas alone.

=== Capital Radio ===
In 1984, Tarrant joined Capital Radio as a presenter, initially presenting the station's Sunday lunchtime show before moving to a late-morning weekday slot, following David Jensen. From March 1987 until April 2004 he hosted Capital Breakfast. The show was highly popular, increasing Capital Radio's audience share in London. Tarrant had regular co-presenter Kara Noble (eventually replaced by Zabe Newsome for a very short duration) as his sidekick for the early years until Noble moved to Heart FM in 1995 with regular contributions from Flying Eye traffic reporter Russ Kane and newsreader Howard Hughes.

At 9:00 am on 2 April 2004, after hosting 4,425 shows, 20 years on Capital Radio and giving away prizes to the value of £3.5 million, Tarrant said his farewell to the station.

=== Who Wants to Be a Millionaire? ===
Tarrant began hosting the television quiz show Who Wants to Be a Millionaire? in 1998. The format was sold to over 100 other countries. Tarrant coined the format's catchphrase, "But we don't want to give you that," and continued his older catchphrase, "Is that your final answer?", contributing it to the format. Tarrant presented the ITV game show Who Wants to Be a Millionaire? from 1998 to 2014, while also providing some audio recordings for some console games, and a tabletop game made by Tiger Electronics based on the show. He recorded a total of 592 episodes across 30 series, in which a total of five contestants won the cash prize of £1 million.

One contestant, Charles Ingram, won the £1 million cash prize (and was declared by Tarrant as "the most amazing contestant we have ever, ever had") but was denied his winnings when it was determined that he had cheated. Tarrant attended the trial regarding the Ingram fraud case. When called to testify, he stated that he had not noticed anything amiss during the filming and had not heard any coughing. He said that following the win the Ingrams had been behaving "as normal as people who had just won £1m would be in that situation." Tarrant also said that he would not have signed the cheque if he had had suspicions of cheating and was "shocked" when he heard about the allegations.

In subsequent interviews about the Ingram case, Tarrant has always said he was completely unaware of any coughing around him at the time of Ingram's run, but realised something was not right after viewing the tape afterwards. He has also said he was very sad about the whole situation, saying: "This was a very cynical plan, motivated by sheer greed. It is hugely insulting to the hundreds and hundreds of other contestants who have come on the show, just hoping for much smaller amounts of money but prepared to try and win their money honestly."

In July 2000, Tarrant signed a contract with ITV to present the show until December 2002. This contract was later extended to 2013. On 22 October 2013, Tarrant announced that, after fifteen years of hosting the programme, he would be leaving Who Wants to Be a Millionaire?, which consequently led ITV to cancel the programme once his contract was finished; no more specials would be filmed after this announcement, leaving only those made before it to be aired as the final episodes. After the final celebrity editions, Tarrant hosted a clip show entitled "Chris' Final Answer", which aired on 11 February 2014 and ended the original series.

In 2018, ITV commissioned a new series of Who Wants to be a Millionaire?, to be presented by new host Jeremy Clarkson. In a television interview, Tarrant said he had chosen not to watch the revived series. He said he would have "politely turned down" an offer by the network to return to the show had he been approached.

In 2020, a TV mini-series, Quiz, about Ingram's attempt to win a million pounds on Who Wants to Be a Millionaire? by cheating, was released. Tarrant was portrayed by the actor Michael Sheen.

=== Other work ===
Tarrant narrated the schools programme Stop, Look, Listen, made by ATV and later Central Television.

Tarrant hosted Everybody's Equal in 1989, although the programme came to an end in 1990 (the format was revived in 1997 by Channel 5 as Whittle, with Tim Vine as host). In 1991 he hosted the second series of Cluedo which was part panel quiz and part murder drama, based on the board game of the same name. Also in 1989 he hosted the non-televised pilot series of Stars in Their Eyes. On 1 January 1993, after Thames Television lost its ITV franchise and been replaced by Carlton Television, Tarrant hosted the first programme of the new contractor, A Carlton New Year. Also in 1993, Tarrant hosted Lose a Million, in which contestants started off with a (fictional) million pounds and were required to lose it by aiming to answer a set of questions incorrectly. Tarrant would later host Who Wants To Be A Millionaire?, in which the objective of the game is to do the opposite. From 1996 to 1999 Tarrant hosted the UK edition of Man O Man.

In 1994, Tarrant hosted a revival of Pop Quiz, previously hosted by Mike Read. It ran one series and eight episodes in total, airing again on Saturday nights (as Read's version did).

Tarrant was also the long-term host of Tarrant on TV, a programme which shows clips featuring a number of unusual television programmes from around the world. He presented the show from 1990 to 2006. In 1998, Tarrant released a compilation album entitled Ultimate Party Megamix on PolyGram Television's record label. A second edition entitled Ultimate Summer Party was also released. Both albums contain songs compiled by Tarrant himself in the form of a megamix.

In 2003, Tarrant did voice over work on the film Johnny English, where he starred as himself hosting a radio presentation of Sauvage's coronation. In 2008, he presented the game show It's Not What You Know on Challenge. In January 2009, Tarrant began hosting a new ITV show, The Colour of Money, which was cancelled after seven episodes after failing to perform well in the ratings.

In June 2008 it was announced he would return to radio, hosting a weekly Saturday morning show for the GMG Radio network of stations including London's 102.2 Smooth Radio, Real Radio in Scotland and the North West's Century Radio. The show would air in direct competition to Jonathan Ross's show on BBC Radio 2 and began on 26 July. It was aired for 12 months until July 2009.

In 2009, UKTV signed Tarrant to present a show for Watch called Tarrant Lets the Kids Loose. The eight-part series, beginning on 4 October, gave three- to six-year-olds the chance to fulfil their greatest ambitions in the adult world, whether running a photographic studio, a radio station or an ice-cream van. The show was executively produced by Lisa Perrin and Tess Cumming.

In April 2010, Tarrant become one of the first three celebrities to be subjected to the British version of the American institution of a comedy roast, on Channel 4's A Comedy Roast. In August 2010, Tarrant launched the Fishing with Chris Tarrant application for iOS devices in association with Angling Times magazine. Also in 2010 he presented ITV1's The Door, a game show in which celebrities faced unpleasant challenges to win money for charity.

In 2012, Tarrant filmed the Chris Tarrant: Extreme Railways series for Channel 5, which has been compared with similar programmes presented by Michael Palin and Michael Portillo and features locations including the Congo-Ocean Railway, the Ghan across Australia and the Konkan Railway in India. The series was aired in December 2012. A second series was shown in 2015. In 2013, Channel 5 aired a new series called Chris Tarrant Goes Fishing. A year later Tarrant began appearing in the ITV daytime game show Show Me the Telly as the TV legends team captain.

Since 2014, Tarrant has appeared in commercials for Lottoland.

On 25 April 2022, Tarrant released his book It's Not A Proper Job: Stories from 50 Years in TV.

In December 2024, after 50 years in television, Tarrant announced his retirement. He said the COVID-19 pandemic led him to reconsider how he wanted to spend his time, stating: "I don't need the money."

== Personal life ==
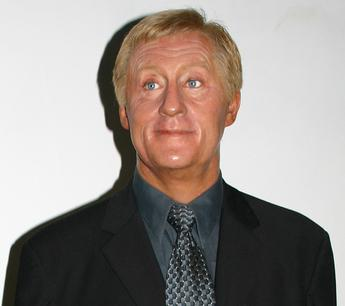
Wax statue of Tarrant at Madame Tussauds

Tarrant had two children from his marriage to Sheila Roberton. The couple married in Southend-on-Sea in 1976 and divorced in 1982. Tarrant met his second wife, Ingrid Dupre-Walsh, when they both worked for TV-am. The couple married in 1991 and divorced in 2007. After a series of tabloid stories, on 18 September 2006 the couple announced that they were separating. The couple previously lived with their two children, including Toby, in Esher, plus two children from Ingrid's previous marriage. In a statement in September 2006, Tarrant said: "I am deeply sorry for the hurt I have caused to my loyal wife and wonderful children, all of whom I adore. I have only myself to blame for the breakdown of my marriage." Since 2008, Tarrant has been in a long-term relationship with legal assistant Jane Bird.

In June 2000, Tarrant's River Thames launch boat the Ben Gunn was vandalised and burnt at its mooring in East Molesey. Tarrant later said he was "absolutely disgusted" by the arson attack, stating that it had potentially put his family in danger because they regularly slept in the boat.

Tarrant's father died in 2005 and his mother died in 2012. Whilst Tarrant was preparing for his mother's funeral, he discovered his father's war diary in an open desk. Tarrant stated, "For the first time, I had his own record of his wartime experiences."

On 12 March 2014, it was reported that Tarrant had suffered a mini stroke whilst on board a return flight from Bangkok to London Heathrow on 1 March 2014, returning from overseas shooting for Chris Tarrant: Extreme Railways. Upon landing, he was rushed to Charing Cross Hospital where doctors undertook emergency surgery to remove a blood clot from his right leg.

In October 2014, Tarrant criticised the "instant naming and shaming" of entertainers during police sex crime investigations, highlighting that Jimmy Tarbuck, Jim Davidson, Michael Le Vell and William Roache were eventually vindicated but suffered "a huge cost financially, emotionally and personally" from being named in the media. Tarrant described the televised raid on the home of Cliff Richard as "outrageous", stating "What has happened to innocent till proven guilty?"

Tarrant is a supporter of Reading F.C. He is a fan of the rock group Status Quo.

=== Charity work ===
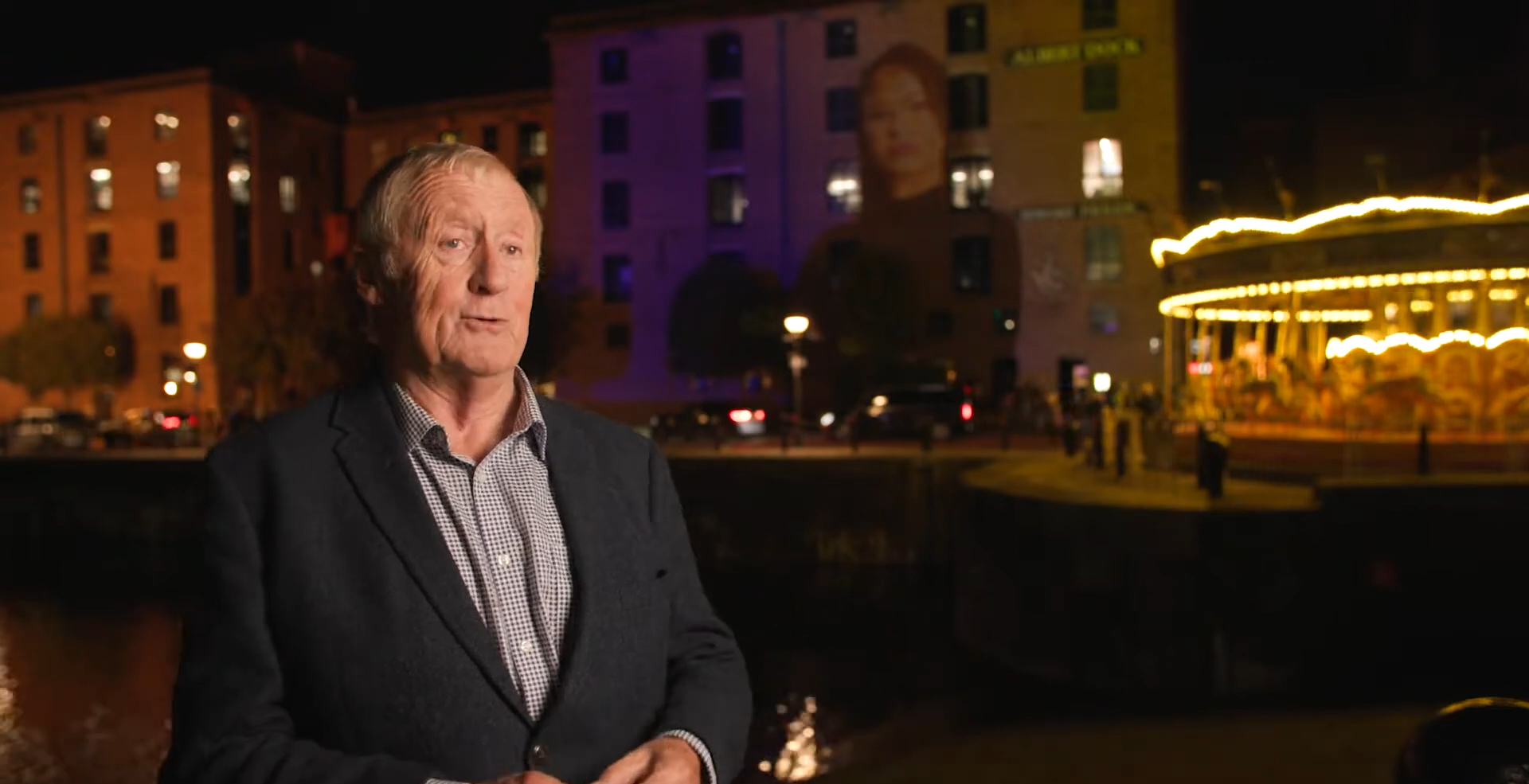
Tarrant promoting the National Lottery's 'People's Portraits' series of Ukrainian refugees at the Royal Albert Dock, Liverpool

Tarrant's charity work, for which he received an OBE in 2004, includes: being an ambassador for the homeless charity, Centrepoint; trustee/patron of West Heath School for disadvantaged children; patron of Milly's Fund, set up in memory of murdered Surrey teenager Amanda Dowler; patron of Swings & Smiles, a charity for children with special needs.

He was a patron of the Headway Thames Valley, until he left in 2006 due to "work commitments".

Tarrant is a patron of the Trooper Potts VC Memorial Trust, Reading, as well as Berkshire Vision, a charity that supports the visually impaired in the Berkshire County.

=== Legal issues ===
On 13 May 2007, Tarrant was arrested on suspicion of assault at an Indian restaurant and was released on police bail. The incident took place at the MemSaab Restaurant on Maid Marian Way, Nottingham, where Tarrant, who had been joking with a couple dining at an adjacent table, threw an item of cutlery towards the man. Tarrant admitted to the BBC that he did jokingly "lob" some cutlery onto the couple's table after asking them to leave him alone to discuss work with his colleagues. He said: "I've no idea what his [the accuser's] motives were – it genuinely makes no sense. I got back from the station at 1 am and to this minute I am completely bemused by what happened." On 25 May 2007, Tarrant was formally cautioned by Nottinghamshire Constabulary with regard to the incident.

On 5 March 2009, Tarrant was arrested on suspicion of assault at his home in Esher. He was later released without charge.

On 18 December 2017, Tarrant appeared in court charged with drink-driving. He returned to court on 18 January 2018 and received a £6,000 fine and a 12-month driving ban.

== Filmography ==
=== Television ===
Year	Title	Role	Channel	Notes
1972–1981	ATV Today	Presenter	ATV	Regular presenter
1974–1981	Tiswas	Presenter	ATV, ITV	272 episodes
1982	O.T.T.	Presenter	ITV Central, ITV	12 episodes
1983	Saturday Stayback	Presenter	ITV Central, ITV	6 episodes
1988	Prove It!	Presenter	TVS, ITV	10 episodes
1989	The Euro Disney Christmas Special	Presenter	ITV	1 episode
1989–1991	That's Showbusiness	Panelist	BBC1	4 episodes
1989–1991	Everybody's Equal	Host	ITV	3 series
1990–2006	Tarrant on TV	Host	ITV	15 series
1991	Cluedo	Host	ITV	6 episodes
1993	Lose a Million	Host	ITV	1 series
1994	Pop Quiz	Host	BBC1	7 episodes
1996–1999	Man O Man	Host	ITV	12 episodes
1998–2014	Who Wants to Be a Millionaire?	Host	ITV	30 series
2007	The Great Pretender	Host	ITV	30 episodes
2008	It's Not What You Know	Host	Challenge	30 episodes
2009	The Colour of Money	Host	ITV	7 episodes
2009	Tarrant Lets the Kids Loose	Host	Watch	1 series
2010	The Door	Host	ITV	2 episodes
2011	The Magicians	Contestant	BBC One	1 episode
2012–2020	Chris Tarrant: Extreme Railways	Presenter	Channel 5	6 series
2013	Show Me the Telly	Team captain	ITV	20 episodes
2017	The Railways That Built Britain with Chris Tarrant	Presenter	Channel 5	3 episodes
2018	Intercity 125: The Train That Changed Britain	Narrator	Channel 5	2 episodes
2019	World's Busiest Train Stations	Narrator	Channel 5	4 episodes
2021	Britain Biggest 1970s Hits	Talking head 'expert'	Channel 5	various episodes

=== Television advertisements ===
Year	Title	Role
1982	Bassett's Liquorice Allsorts	Himself
1983	Kellogg's Rice Krispies	Himself
1990	Kentucky Fried Chicken	Himself
1991–2001	Capital London	Himself
1992	Pontin's	Himself, voice only
1994	Daily Express	Himself
1997	101 Dalmatians	Himself, voice only
1998–2001	ONdigital	Himself
2000	McDonald's	Himself
2005	Tesco	Himself, voice only
2012	Morrisons	Himself, voice only
2014–2016	Lottoland	Himself

== Bibliography ==
- 2008, Millionaire Moments: The Story of Who Wants to Be a Millionaire
- 2023, It's Not A Proper Job: Stories From 50 Years in Television
- 2025, For The Love Of Bears

== Discography ==
- Album Tiswas presents The Four Bucketeers
- Single "The Bucket of Water Song/Smello"
- Single "Water is Wonderful/Raspberry Rock"
- Album Saturday Scene
- Album Ultimate Party Megamix
- Album Ultimate Summer Party

== Awards and honours ==
Year	Award		Work	Result	Notes
1981	British Academy Television Awards	'Harlequin' (Drama/Light Entertainment)	Tiswas	Nominated	
2000	Broadcasting Press Guild Awards	Best Performer (Non-Acting)	Who Wants to Be a Millionaire?	Won	
2000	National Television Awards	Most Popular Entertainment Presenter	Tarrant on TV	Nominated	
2000	National Television Awards	Special Recognition Award	—N/a	Won	
2001	RTS Television Award	Best Presenter	Who Wants to Be a Millionaire?	Nominated	
2006	British Comedy Awards	Lifetime Achievement	—N/a	Won	

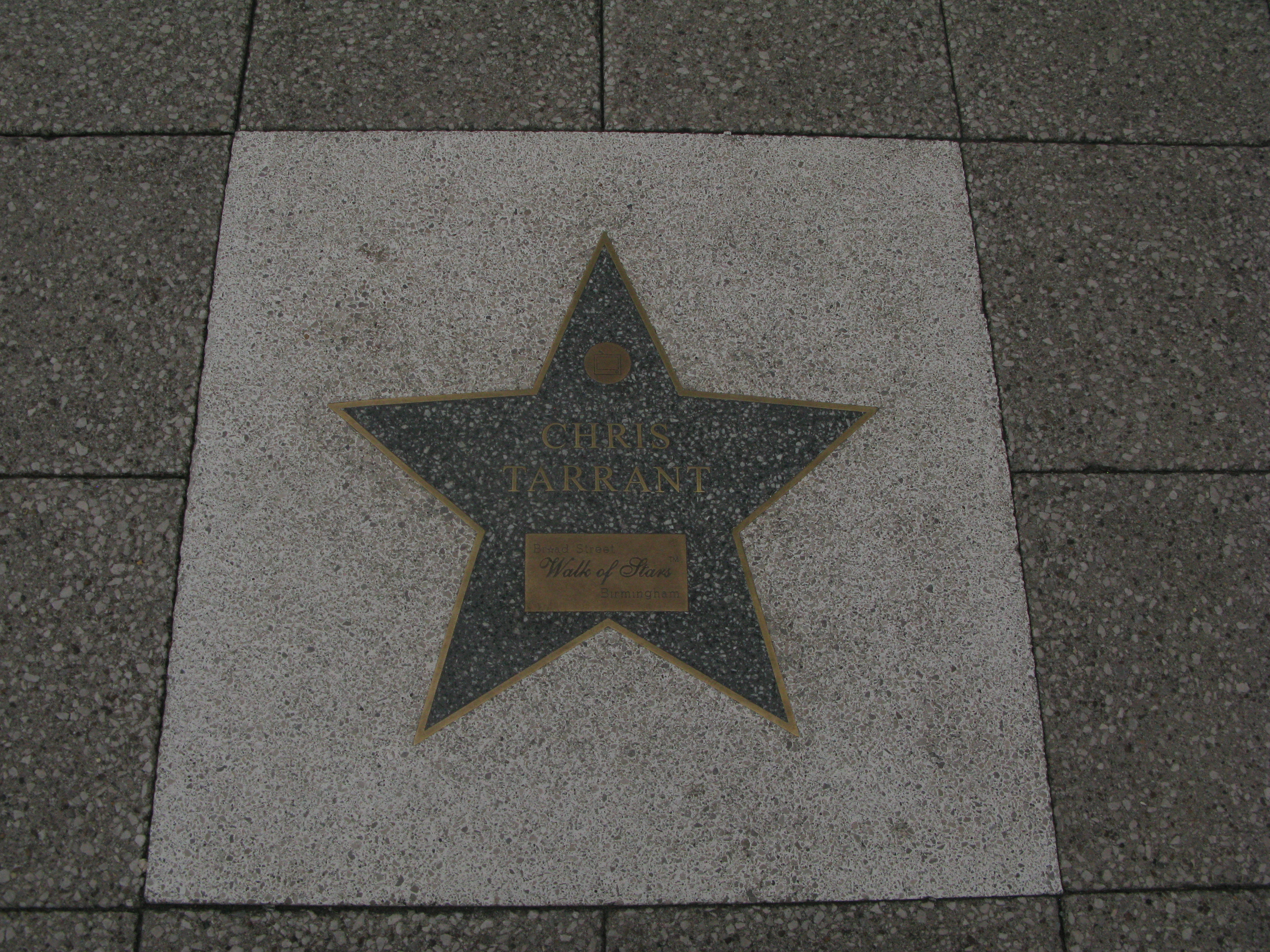
Tarrant's star on Broad Street, awarded to him in 2010

Tarrant was ranked number 38 in ITV's TV's 50 Greatest Stars poll of 2006.

In August 2010, Tarrant was awarded a place on Birmingham's Walk of Stars, and made an honorary citizen of Birmingham. On receiving the award, he said, "I love it here. I'm an honorary Brummie. I owe everything that has happened in my career to my start in Birmingham with ATV and Tiswas. I'm very proud to have my own bit of pavement on Broad Street in Brum."
