= The Colour of Money (game show) =

2009 British game show

- The Colour of Money logo
- Genre: Game show
- Created by: Paul Brassey; Daniel Moody
- Developed by: Jim Cannon; Andy Culpin; Sam Pollard; David Young
- Directed by: Paul Kirrage
- Presented by: Chris Tarrant
- Starring: Millie Clode
- Narrated by: Jon Strickland
- Composer: Will Slater
- Country of origin: United Kingdom
- Original language: English
- No. of series: 1
- No. of episodes: 7 (Originally 8, one episode unaired)

Production
- Executive producers: Andy Culpin; Michael Mannes; Matt Walton; David Young
- Production location: The London Studios
- Editors: Mark Sangster; Mark Goodwin; Tim Clack
- Running time: 60 minutes (including adverts)
- Production company: 12 Yard

Original release
- Network: ITV
- Release: 21 February – 11 April 2009

The Colour of Money is a British game show, broadcast on ITV between 21 February and 11 April 2009. The programme was produced by 12 Yard, and hosted by Chris Tarrant and Millie Clode. The format was originally devised by Paul Brassey and Daniel Moody in 2006, and developed by Jim Cannon, Andy Culpin, Samuel Pollard and David Young.

A total of eight episodes were produced but only seven of these were broadcast, due to poor viewing figures. Subsequently, the programme was axed by ITV on 12 June 2009. The show later survived as a board game manufactured by Drumond Park.

== Format ==
Twenty stylised "cash machines" stand on the stage, each with a screen displaying a different colour. Each machine is loaded with a different cash amount ranging from £1,000 to £20,000 in increments of £1,000; the amounts are kept secret from everyone. At the beginning of the game, the contestant selects one of three "cash cards", each of which has been credited with a value of £50,000 or higher in multiples of £1,000. The contestant runs the selected card through a reader to reveal its value, which becomes their target for the game.

On each turn, the contestant selects a machine and the host starts it. The screen displays a starting value of zero and begins to count up slowly in £1,000 steps. As long as the machine has not exceeded its limit, the contestant may shut it off any time by calling "Stop!", at which point the displayed amount is added to their total. However, if the machine reaches its limit and continues to run without being stopped, it shuts itself off and the contestant banks no money for that turn. After the contestant stops a machine, the amount it contains is revealed by allowing it to keep running until shutoff occurs.

In order to win the target amount, the contestant must bank enough money to reach it within 10 turns; failure to do so forfeits all the money. In addition, if it becomes mathematically impossible to reach the target with the remaining machines, the game ends immediately and the contestant leaves with nothing.

Co-host Millie Clode provided the contestant with a statistical rundown between turns. informing them of the accumulated total, the amount they still needed to bank, the number of turns remaining, and the average amount they needed to bank per turn in order to reach the target.

Each episode of the show featured two games.

== Series ==
The series was filmed at The London Studios, with the first episode airing at 6:35 PM on Saturday, 21 February 2009. The second, third (postponed on Saturday, 7 March) and fourth episodes were broadcast at the slightly later time of 6:45 PM. The fifth episode aired on Saturday, 28 March at 8:20 PM. The sixth episode aired on Saturday, 4 April at 7:55 PM. The seventh episode aired on Saturday, 11 April at 9:15 PM. The eighth and final episode that was scheduled to air on 18 April was rescheduled for 29 December, but again was not shown.

== Reception ==
=== Ratings ===
Episode viewing figures from BARB:

Show	Date	Audience (millions)	Viewing share (%)
1	21 February 2009	3.99	18
2	28 February 2009	4.43	20
3	14 March 2009	4.24	20
4	21 March 2009	4.23	20
5	28 March 2009	2.71	12.3
6	4 April 2009	2.50	12.1
7	11 April 2009	2.86	12.5

Prior to the show going on air, former ITV controller of Entertainment Duncan Gray, writing in The Independent, suggested that ITV executives were hoping for an audience of around 5 million viewers.

=== Critical reaction ===
The programme received a largely negative response from critics. The Times said that it was "tedious", while The News of the World branded it "exactly the kind of cynical crowd-pleasing guff we’ve come to despise ITV for". One of the few positive reviews came from Charlie Brooker, writing in The Guardian, who called the show "so compelling, tense and yet ultimately random, it's likely to be a huge worldwide hit.". In his review of 2009, Brooker described this as the "most off-the-mark prediction" of the year. Readers of ukgameshows.com named it the worst new game show of 2009 in their "Hall of shame" poll.

== International versions ==
The TV format was sold in Italy with the title Il colore dei soldi aired on Italia 1, hosted by Enrico Papi in September 2009. Papi also hosted the short-lived Italian adaptation of The Weakest Link in 2001.

It was also sold in Lithuania, with the title Švarūs pinigai (Clean money), which aired on LNK in 2009–10, first hosted by Ridas Žirgulis using the original format, later replaced by Vitalijus Cololo, with the format changing to remove cash cards, and reducing the number of cash machine selections per game from 10 to 5.

Country	Name	Presenter(s)	Channel	Date of transmission
Italy	Il colore dei soldi	Enrico Papi	Italia 1	2009
Lithuania	Švarūs pinigai	Ridas Žirgulis; Vitalijus Cololo	LNK	2009–2010
