= Lottoland =

Gibraltar lottery betting company

Lottoland Ltd.
- Trade name: Lottoland
- Type: Limited
- Industry: Lottery betting and sweepstakes
- Founded: May 2013; 13 years ago
- Founder: David Rosen
- Headquarters: Ocean Village Marina, Gibraltar
- Area served: Australia; Gibraltar; Ireland; Italy; United Kingdom; South Africa; India; Brazil
- Key people: Nigel Birrell (CEO)
- Revenue: over EUR 300 million (2016)
- Number of employees: over 350 (April 2017)
- Website: www.lottoland.com

Lottoland Limited is a company based in Gibraltar. One of its main areas of business is offering online bets on the results of more than 30 lottery draws.

Lottoland experienced significant growth in revenue and customer base from 2013 to 2017, but amid the UK's increased remote betting duty, the company confirmed it was considering redundancies in mid-2026 as part of an “organisational restructure".

== History ==
Lottoland was founded by David Rosen in May 2013. Based in Gibraltar, the company originally started with seven employees.

Chris Tarrant, who hosted the British quiz show Who Wants to Be a Millionaire? has been the brand ambassador for Lottoland UK since 2014. The company has been the name sponsor of Brookvale Oval in Sydney, the home stadium of the National Rugby League team the Manly Warringah Sea Eagles, since the start of 2017 .

The legally independent Lottoland Foundation, which is based in the German city of Hamburg and is funded by Lottoland, has existed since autumn 2016.

== Products ==
The company provides digital scratchcards, online table games, card games and slot games, whereby customers can win cash and non-cash prizes. Since 2019, the company also offers sports betting.

=== Lottery betting ===
To be able to pay out large cash prizes at any time, the company has completed a guaranteed insurance transaction (Insurance-Linked Securities (ILS)) that insures it against high bet payouts.

== Licenses and legal background ==
Lottoland currently has licenses from national supervisory bodies for lotteries in Gibraltar, Italy, the United Kingdom, Ireland, Australia — where it has a wagering license — South Africa, where it has a fixed-odds contingencies license along with B2C and B2B licenses — and Sweden, where it has an online gambling and betting license.

In April 2018, the Australian government stated that it was considering banning Lottoland. Draft laws passed by the Australian parliament in June 2018 will see "synthetic lotteries" such as Lottoland banned in Australia from 2019, with concerns about companies such as Lottoland hurting family-operated newsagencies, being misleading about prizes and contributing to problem gambling. Lottoland then filed a complaint against the Australian Communications and Media Authority, and the Supreme Court of New South Wales ruled in favour of the company.

The lottery companies from the 16 federal states of Germany that have joined to form the Deutscher Lotto- und Totoblock consider betting on lottery results offered by providers such as Lottoland or Tipp24 to be a violation of the German Inter-State Gambling Treaty (Glücksspielstaatsvertrag). In March 2024, Lottoland received a lottery brokerage licence from Germany's gambling regulator GGL, allowing it to distribute state-licensed online lotteries.

In 2019, the Swedish Gambling Authority fined United Lottery Solutions, an owner of lottoland.se, for providing the lottery Eurojackpot, which was not covered by Swedish gambling license. In 2020 Lottoland lost its first appeal.

In September 2021, The UK gambling commission (UKGC) announced they would be taking regulatory action against Lottoland. The company was fined £760,000 ($1 million) by the UKGC and cited the reasoning behind the fine as social responsibility and anti-money laundering rule breaches between October 2019 and November 2020.

== Figures and structures ==
=== Customers and turnover ===
The company claims a customer base of more than 6 million people from twelve countries (as of June 2017). It generated sales of over 300 million euros in 2016.

Lottoland's growth in sales of 820 percent between 2012 and 2015 enabled it to be placed at number 128 in the Financial Times FT1000 report on the fastest-growing companies in Europe.

=== Acquisitions and investments ===
Lottoland took over the German lottery portal Lottohelden at the end of 2015. The company had shares in Jumbo Interactive, an online provider of lottery tickets listed on the Australian Securities Exchange, but sold them in July 2017, two months after their purchase. The company has shares in LottoGopher, a provider of lottery tickets from Los Angeles listed on the Canadian Stock Exchange.

In May 2018, the company acquired the majority share of Giochi24.

== Criticism ==
The business model of Lottoland has been criticised for taking away money from good causes and charities: many lotteries such as the British National Lottery give a sizeable percentage of ticket prices to charity, while secondary lotteries such as Lottoland do not.
