= Scottish Legal News =

E-mail newsletter for the Scottish legal sector

- Website type: News
- Headquarters: Dundee, Scotland, UK
- Editors: Kapil Summan; Graham Ogilvy (managing)
- Website: www.scottishlegal.com
- Commercial: Yes
- Users: 17,000
- Launched: June 2008

Scottish Legal News (SLN) is a free online news service for the Scottish legal sector.

Established in 2008, its daily content, distributed online and by email, includes a blackletter case law report as well as law firm announcements, such as appointments and promotions; legislative changes; international human rights stories; and events and job opportunities.

A poll commissioned by the Law Society of Scotland in 2012 found that 76 percent of Scottish solicitors regularly read Scottish Legal News.

The publication's editorials and surveys of the legal profession, on wide-ranging issues including Brexit, lawyers' safety, and major legal reforms, regularly attract wider press attention.

The publication is edited by Kapil Summan and the managing editor is Graham Ogilvy.
