= Mike McCartney =

British musician and photographer (born 1944)

Mike McGear BEM
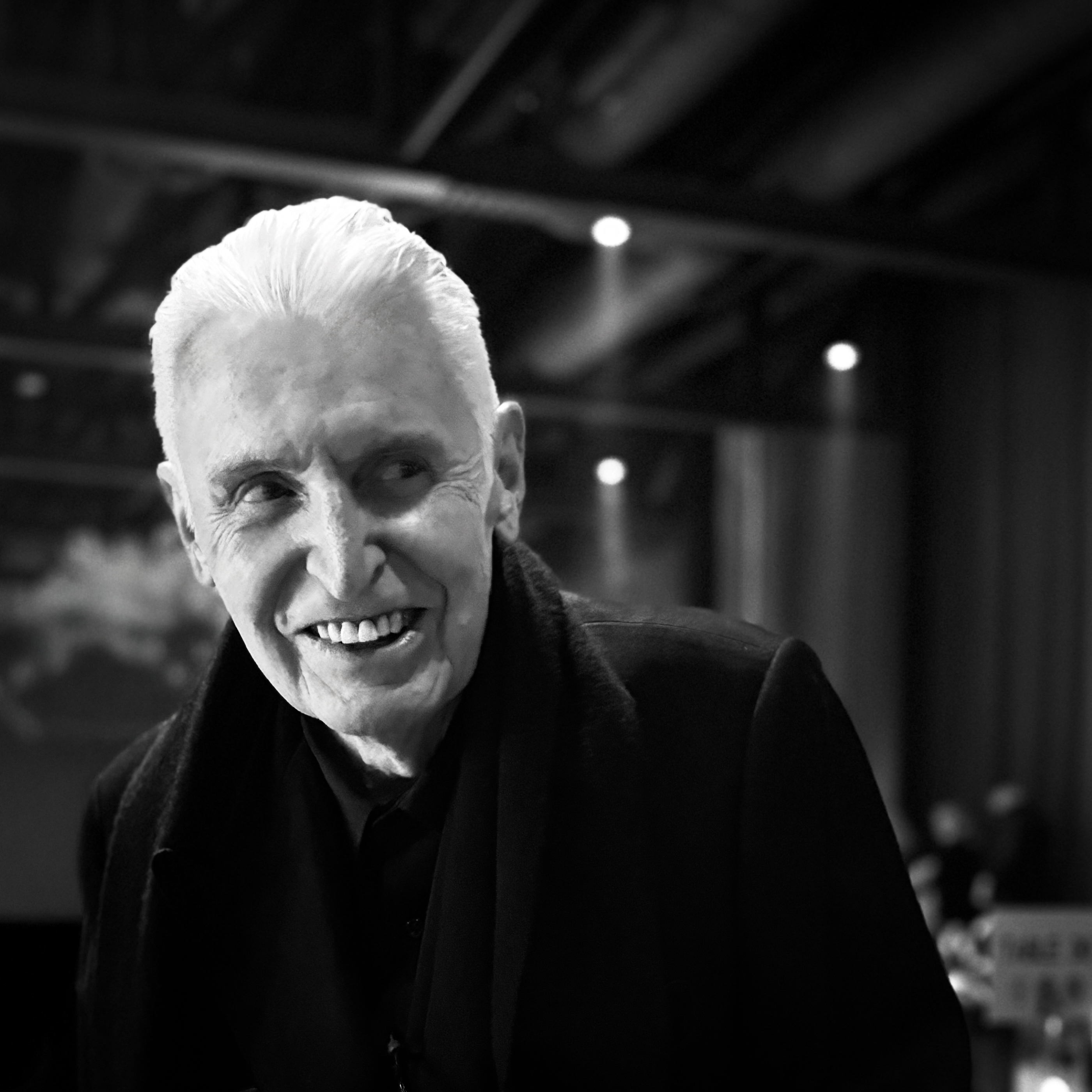
- McGear at the Wirral Life Awards, Titanic Hotel, in Liverpool, 2024
- Born: Peter Michael McCartney; 7 January 1944 (age 82); Liverpool, England
- Other name: Mike McGear
- Occupations: Musician; photographer
- Years active: 1966–present
- Spouse(s): Angela Fishwick (m. 1968, divorced) Rowena Horne (m. 1982)
- Children: 6
- Relatives: Paul McCartney (brother); Heather McCartney (niece); Mary McCartney (niece); Stella McCartney (niece); James McCartney (nephew)
- Musical career
- Genres: Rock; pop rock; comedy
- Instruments: Vocals; piano; guitar
- Labels: Parlophone; Island; Warner Bros.; Carrere
- Formerly of: The Scaffold; Grimms

Peter Michael McCartney (born 7 January 1944), also known professionally as Mike McGear, is an English musician and photographer who was a member of the groups the Scaffold and Grimms. He is the younger brother of former Beatle Paul McCartney.

== Early years ==
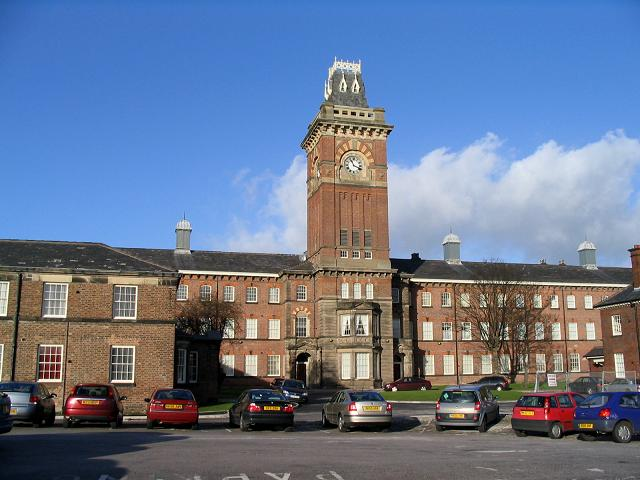
Walton Hospital, Paul and Mike's birthplace.

Michael and his brother Paul were both born in the Walton Hospital in Walton, Liverpool, England, where their mother, Mary McCartney, had previously worked as a nursing sister in charge of the maternity ward. Michael was not enrolled in a Catholic school because his father, Jim McCartney, believed that they leaned too much towards religion instead of education. At age 17, McCartney started his first job at Jackson's the Tailors in Ranelagh Street, Liverpool. The year after, he took an apprenticeship at Andre Bernard, a ladies' hairdresser in the same street.

== Musical career ==
At the time the Beatles became successful, Mike McCartney was working as an apprentice at a ladies’ hairdresser, where the staff included future actor Lewis Collins and budding comedian Jimmy Tarbuck. Simultaneously, he was a member of the Liverpool comedy-poetry-music group The Scaffold (along with Roger McGough and John Gorman). The group formed in 1962 (the year of the Beatles' first hit). Mike decided to use a stage name, so as not to appear to be riding his brother's coattails. After first dubbing himself "Mike Blank", he settled on "Mike McGear", "gear" being the Liverpudlian equivalent of "fab". The band was subsequently signed to Parlophone.

The Scaffold recorded a number of UK hit singles between 1966 and 1974, the most successful being the 1968 Christmas number one single, "Lily the Pink". McGear composed the band's next biggest hit, 1967's "Thank U Very Much". In 1968, he and McGough released a "duo" album (McGough & McGear) that included the usual Scaffold mix of lyrics, poems, and comedy. The Scaffold ended up hosting a TV programme, Score with the Scaffold, which limited the musical portion of their career, and they were dropped by Parlophone. McGear then signed to Island Records and released a solo musical album entitled Woman in 1972, which again included many tracks co-written with McGough, and The Scaffold subsequently released their own album on the label, Fresh Liver.

The Scaffold then added several other members and released two albums on Island in 1973 as GRIMMS (an acronym for Gorman-Roberts-Innes-McGear-McGough-Stanshall). However, McGear quit GRIMMS after the second album out of tension between himself and one of the poets added to the group.

McGear then signed to Warner Bros. Records and in 1974 released his second non-comedy musical album, McGear, in which he collaborated with his brother Paul and his band Wings. Although four singles were released from these sessions, only "Leave It" enjoyed any moderate chart success (No. 36 UK). However, also recorded during McCartney's sessions with Wings was a Scaffold "reunion" song, "Liverpool Lou", which became The Scaffold's last top-ten hit. This led to the group's re-formation in 1974, and they recorded and performed together through to 1977.

Individually, McGear released a few more singles. His final release, while still using the name Mike McGear, was the 1981 release "No Lar Di Dar (Is Lady Di)". This was a satirical tribute to Lady Diana Spencer, released at the time of her wedding to Prince Charles.

In the 1980s, after retiring from music, Mike McCartney decided to end his use of the "McGear" pseudonym and revert to using his family name.

== Photography career ==
McCartney was a photographer during his entire musical career, and has continued with photography since then. Beatles' manager Brian Epstein nicknamed him "Flash Harry" in the early 1960s because he was always taking pictures with a flash gun. He has published books of pictures that he took of the Beatles backstage and on tour and, in 2008, brought out a limited edition book of photos that he had taken spontaneously backstage at Live8. In 2005, McCartney premiered and exhibited a collection of photographs that he had taken in the 1960s, called "Mike McCartney's Liverpool Life", both in Liverpool and other venues, such as the Provincial Museum of Alberta. In addition, an exhibition book of the collection was published. He also took the cover photograph for Paul McCartney's 2005 solo album Chaos and Creation in the Backyard. Mike McCartney's North Highlands, a collection of his photographs taken in the Scottish Highlands, was published in 2009, with a foreword by King Charles III.

== Personal life ==
The McCartney brothers also have a sister named Ruth whom their father Jim adopted in 1964 when he married her mother, Angela Williams. Mike McCartney married Angela Fishwick on 7 June 1968 and they had three daughters: Benna, Theran, and Abigail Faith; they later divorced. He married Rowena Horne on 29 May 1982 and they have three sons: Joshua, Max, and Sonny.

In 2019, McCartney was awarded the British Empire Medal in the Queen's Birthday Honours for "services to the community in Merseyside".

== Solo discography ==
=== Albums ===
UK releases

- McGough and McGear (Parlophone PMC 7047 [mono], PCS 7047 [stereo]) [LP] May 1968
- Woman (Island ILPS 9191) [LP] April 1972
- McGear (Warner Bros. Records K 56051) [LP] September 1974
- McGough and McGear (Parlophone PCS 7332) [LP] April 1989 [Reissue of the 1968 album]
- McGough and McGear (EMI CDP 7 91877 2) [CD] April 1989 [Reissue of the 1968 album]
- McGear (See For Miles SEECD 339) [CD] April 1992 [reissue of the 1974 album, with two additional tracks]
- Woman (Edsel EDCD 507) [CD] February 1997 [reissue of the 1972 album, with four short tracks omitted]
- A Collection of Songs for the Young Homeless of Merseyside (Merseyside Accommodation Project), [CD] December 1996 [Multi-artist commemorative release, including one newly recorded track by McGear]

US releases

- McGear (Warner Bros. BS 2825) [LP] October 1974
- McGear (Rykodisc RCD 10192) [CD] September 1990 [Reissue of the 1974 album, with one additional track]
- McGough and McGear (Real Gone Music RGM-0025) [CD] Feb. 2012 [Reissue of the 1968 album]

=== Singles ===
UK releases

- "Woman" / "Kill" (Island WIP 6131) April 1972
- "Leave It" / "Sweet Baby" (Warner Bros. K 16446) September 1974 – UK #36
- "Sea Breezes" / "Giving Grease a Ride" (Warner Bros. K 16520) February 1975
- "Dance the Do" / "Norton" (Warner Bros. K16573) July 1975
- "Simply Love You" / "What Do We Really Know" (Warner Bros. K 16658) November 1975
- "Do Nothing All Day" / "A to Z" (EMI 2485) June 1976
- "All the Whales in the Ocean" / "I Juz Want What You Got – Money!" (Carrere CAR 144) May 1980
- "No Lar Di Dar (Is Lady Di)" / "God Bless Our Gracious Queen" (Conn CONN 29781) July 1981

US release

- "Leave It" / "Sweet Baby" (Warner Bros. WBS 8037) October 1974

=== Discography notes ===
- The album McGough and McGear was by Roger McGough and Mike McGear. Guest musicians, uncredited on the original pressing, include: Jimi Hendrix, Mitch Mitchell, Zoot Money, Paul Samwell-Smith, Gary Leeds and Paul McCartney. Paul's then-girlfriend, Jane Asher, also uncredited, contributed backing vocals on the song "Living Room."
- The single "No Lar Di Dar (Is Lady Di)" is by Mike McGear (McCartney) and The Monarchists.
- The track "Take It into Your Hearts," on the Merseyside Accommodation Project release, is billed as by Mike McCartney.
- All other releases billed as by Mike McGear.
- See also The Scaffold Discography.
- See also Grimms Discography.
