= Anderson Jacobson =

Vendor of communications equipment

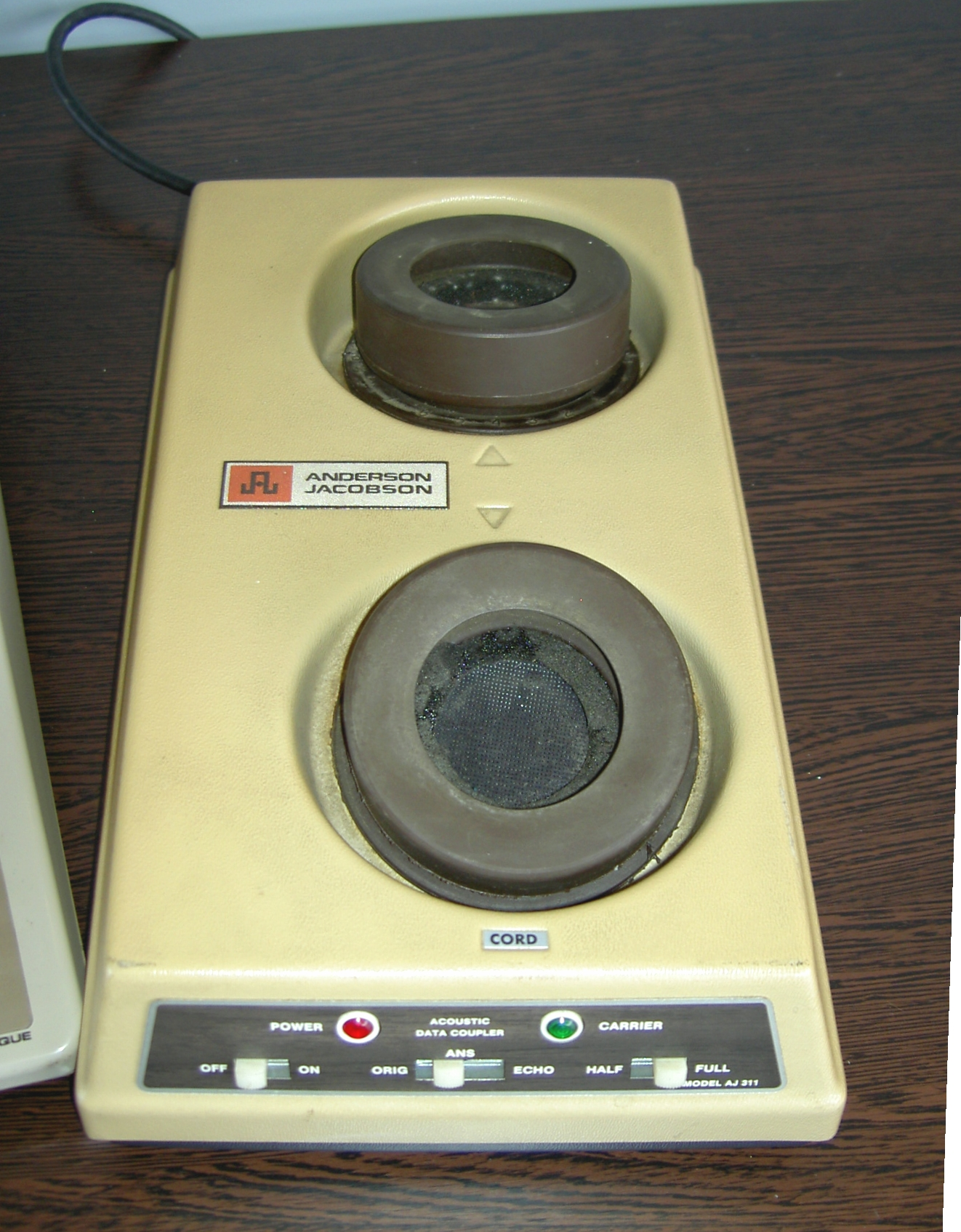
Acoustic modem AJ 311 (Anderson Jacobson)

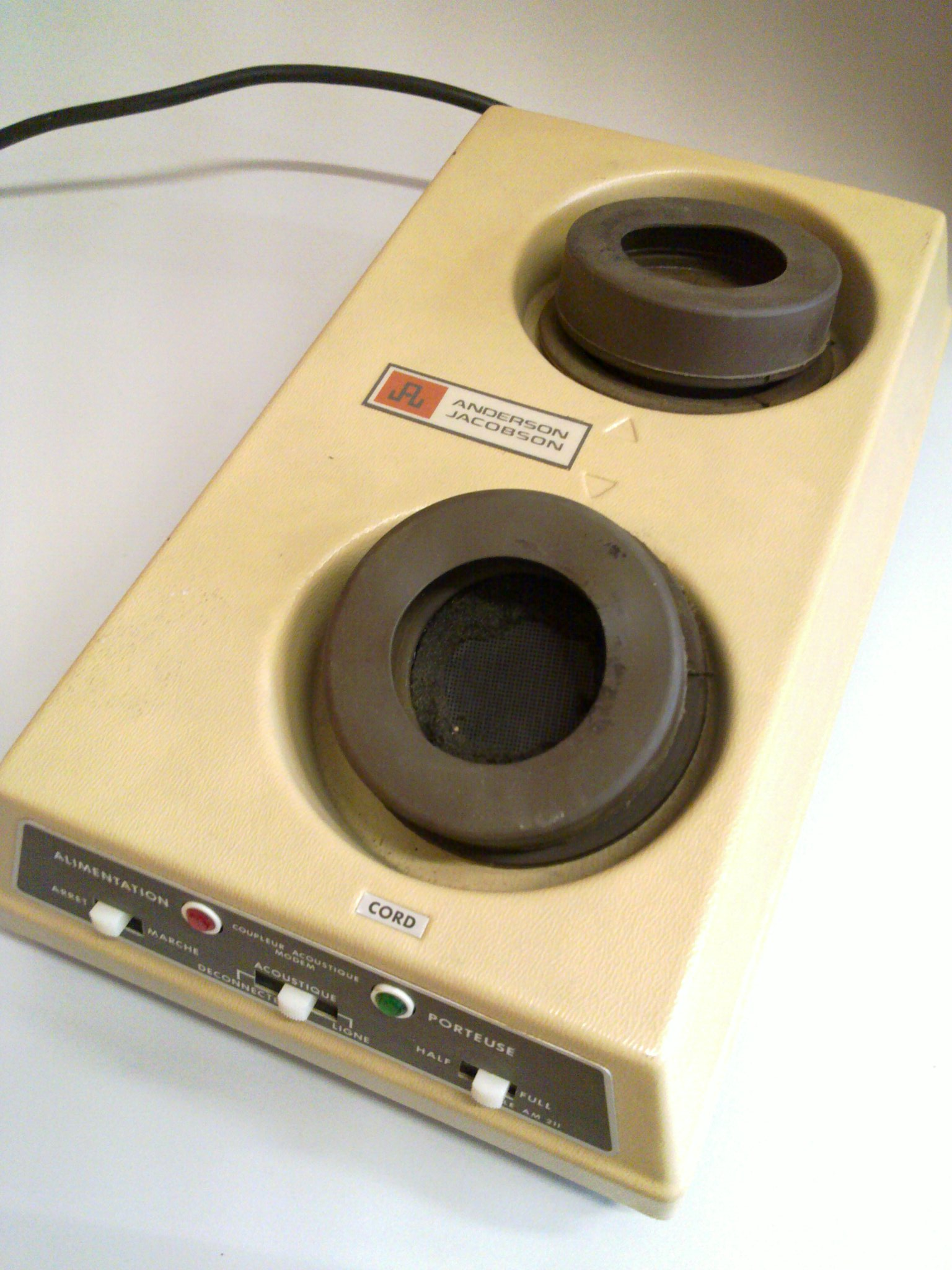
An AM211 Andersen Jacobson

Anderson Jacobson, also known for a time as CXR Anderson Jacobson and today as CXR Networks, is a vendor of communications equipment.

Anderson Jacobson formed in California in 1967 as a spin-off from SRI International (then the Stanford Research Institute), to commercialize its acoustic coupling modem designs. In the 1970s and 1980s, the company manufactured modems, some intended for consumers. The introduction of the Hayes Smartmodem in 1981 led to many early vendors, including Anderson Jacobson, being forced from the market as newer companies entered at ever lower price points.

The company was acquired by CXR Telecom in 1988, at which time The Times was following Anderson Jacobson's earnings reports. The flow of new products continued.

Today the company is a privately owned communication equipment vendor supplying products to Telecom Carriers, Service Providers, and the Defense, Transport and Utility markets. The company is headquartered in Abondant, France.

== History ==
Anderson Jacobson was primarily a California-based manufacturer of acoustic coupler modems. They also manufactured printing terminals designed to replace teletypes.

=== Modems ===
Anderson Jacobson began early in 1967 as a manufacturer of one of the first acoustic data couplers. This technical advancement was a step beyond directly wiring to phone lines. By 1973, the company had acoustic coupler products that transmitted at 150, 300 and 1200 baud. Their early designs were the size of a modern desktop computer, with the coupler on the front under a hinged wooden cover that swung shut over the handset to insulate it from external sounds. Over time the size of the required electronics shrank and later models were only slightly larger than the handset alone.

=== Terminals ===
Some of its terminals were CRTs and others were Printer/Keyboard devices.

==== Historical Table of Anderson Jacobson terminals ====
Among the terminals that were marketed by Anderson Jacobson are:

Model	Type	Announced	Price	Image(s)	Notes
AJ 510	CRT	May 1979	$1,995		
AJ 841	KB/Printer	February 1973	$2,995		printer uses IBM Selectric electric typewriter mechanism

== CXR ==
After the merger, industrial references varied, including "Anderson Jacobson (CXR)"

CXR was purchased by Emrise Corporation an international manufacturer of defense and aerospace electronic devices and subsystems and telecommunications equipment. and, in 2016 sold for 690,000 British pounds to its former chairman/CEO.

CXR, described as "manufactures network telecommunications equipment," was still operating as of 2017, albeit not in the areas for which AJ had begun in 1967.

== See also ==
- SRI International
- List of SRI International spin-offs
