= The Scaffold =

English performance group (since 1964)

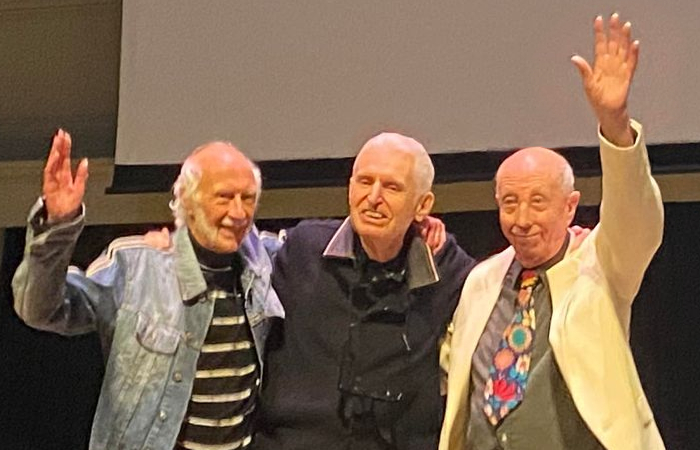
- (L–R): Roger McGough, Mike McGear and John Gorman in Bristol, 2023

Background information
- Origin: Liverpool, England
- Genres: Music hall; comedy rock
- Years active: 1964–1977 (Note: Reunions: 2008–2010, 2018, 2020, 2022–present)
- Labels: Parlophone; Island; Warner Bros.; Bronze
- Members: Mike McGear; Roger McGough; John Gorman

The Scaffold are a comedy, poetry and music trio from Liverpool, England, consisting of musical performer Mike McGear, poet Roger McGough and comic entertainer John Gorman. They are perhaps most notable for their successful singles "Thank U Very Much" (1967) and the UK Christmas number 1 "Lily the Pink" (1968). Since initially disbanding in 1977, the group have occasionally re-formed for performances and projects. In 1970, they starred in their own weekly BBC children's television series, Score with the Scaffold.

== Career ==
=== Overview ===
The members of the Scaffold were originally part of a performing revue group known as The Liverpool One Fat Lady All Electric Show. ("One Fat Lady" is the bingo call for the number 8 and the performers mostly lived in the Liverpool 8 postal district of the Toxteth area of Liverpool.) McGough's fellow Liverpool poet Adrian Henri was also a founding member of this early configuration.

Working almost exclusively as a trio under the name The Scaffold from 1964, Gorman, McGear and McGough performed a mixture of comic songs, comedy sketches and the poetry of McGough (as evidenced on their 1968 live album), and they released a number of singles and albums on Parlophone and EMI between 1966 and 1971, with several more on Island, Warner Bros. and Bronze thereafter.

"Lily the Pink" topped the UK charts in 1968, becoming that year's Christmas number one. The group also composed and sang the theme tune to the popular BBC TV comedy The Liver Birds, which aired from 1969 to 1978.

The group's more musical endeavours were usually augmented with contributions by session musicians. Elton John, Jack Bruce and Graham Nash were among the session musicians who performed on The Scaffold's early records. Tim Rice, who was at that time an assistant to their producer Norrie Paramor, also contributed backing vocals to some of their material. Additionally, although not officially credited as a permanent member of the group during its heyday, guitarist Andy Roberts was a frequent musical collaborator from as far back as 1962, acting as musical director and arranger in a live setting throughout their career and playing on a large number of their releases.

The Scaffold achieved Top 10 success in the UK with:

- "Thank U Very Much" (No. 4), composed by McGear. (McGear has been reluctant to explain the reference in the song to "Aintree Iron".)
- "Lily the Pink" (No. 1), based on a traditional song about Lydia Pinkham. It sold over one million copies, was the Christmas number 1 in 1968 and was awarded a gold disc.
- "Liverpool Lou" (No. 7) (written by Dominic Behan), recorded during the 1974 McGear sessions with Wings.

In addition to the hit singles, The Scaffold's output included four albums: The Scaffold on Parlophone in 1968, L. the P. on Parlophone in 1969, Fresh Liver on Island in 1973, and Sold Out on Warner Brothers in 1975. As a rule their early albums contained a higher ratio of live material and were less musically driven than their singles, often focusing on McGough's poetry and Gorman and McGear's extended comic vignettes. Their debut album was an entirely live affair, and their second album featured a side of live tracks paired with a side of studio recordings.

The three members also recorded and toured extensively outside the confines of the original trio: In 1968, even before the release of The Scaffold's own debut album, McGough and McGear recorded an album without Gorman (the prosaically titled McGough and McGear) that featured rock-driven musical backing from Jimi Hendrix and Mitch Mitchell among others, and in 1971 the trio joined forces with former members of The Bonzo Dog Band and The Liverpool Scene to form the loose coalition of performers known as Grimms (an outfit that would go on to regularly tour the country and release three albums of its own during the early 1970s). McGear also found time to record two solo albums in 1972 and 1974.

The Scaffold's first greatest hits album, entitled Singles A's & B's, was released on See for Miles Records in 1982. This was followed by a second greatest hits collection, the first on Compact Disc, The Scaffold: The Songs, in 1992. Three additional compilations of the band's Parlophone tracks have since been released (two of which also include the Warner Bros. "Liverpool Lou" track).

=== The 1970s ===
In 1970 The Scaffold starred in their own popular weekly BBC children's television series, Score with the Scaffold. The opening and closing theme tune was usually a shortened variation on their earlier single "2 Day's Monday". By this point the group had also recorded enough tracks for a new studio album, but apart from a few songs that found their way onto singles that year, much of this material remained unreleased until it was included on a 1998 compilation, The Scaffold at Abbey Road 1966-1971.

In early 1971 The Scaffold provided some catchy tunes for inclusion in a television publicity campaign heralding the introduction of decimal currency to the UK. In this series of informative five-minute programmes, titled Decimal Five and shown on BBC1, their songs included such relevant lyrics as "Give more, get change" and "Use your old coppers in sixpenny lots". In the same year, in order to broaden their musical palate further the trio and erstwhile collaborator Andy Roberts merged into the expanded line-up of Grimms with performers such as Neil Innes, Vivian Stanshall and Zoot Money, alongside McGough's fellow Liverpool poets Adrian Henri and Brian Patten. Innes and Stanshall can also be heard contributing to The Scaffold's final release for Parlophone, Do The Albert, which also featured Keith Moon and Les Harvey. During the same period The Scaffold also recorded the darkly humorous theme tune to the British horror movie Burke & Hare, a version of which saw eventual release on The Scaffold at Abbey Road 1966-1971 (both versions of the song feature a prominent backing vocal from Vivian Stanshall, suggesting that the session may feature the same lineup of musicians as Do The Albert).

In 1972, the group made a half hour musical movie entitled Plod based on an earlier stage production that centred around Gorman's long-running "P.C. Plod" character. The film was made on location in Liverpool, and included boys from the Liverpool Institute High School, earlier attended by the McCartney brothers and Beatle George Harrison. The film was long thought lost but recently appeared on a DVD of How I Won The War featuring John Lennon. McGear also released his first solo album, Woman with some of the musical performers from Grimms, and Grimms as a unit continued with their exhaustive tours of the UK.

By early 1973 The Scaffold had transferred to Island Records and released Fresh Liver, their first full album of new material since 1969, and from which no singles were released (aside from "W.P.C Hodges" which was credited to Gorman as a solo artist). The new album again featured most of the musical performers from Grimms and as such, like the earlier McGough And McGear album, it relied less heavily than usual on purely spoken-word material. The trio then concentrated on their work as part of Grimms, until the end of the year when McGear left that group after frayed tempers on another demanding UK tour led to an altercation with Brian Patten.

After recording his next solo album McGear and the 1974 success of the one-off Scaffold single "Liverpool Lou" recorded with Paul McCartney and Wings (B-side "Ten Years After on Strawberry Jam", also featured a musical backing composed by Paul and Linda McCartney and performed by Wings), McGear reunited The Scaffold to tour and record their final album, Sold Out. Following the template set by Fresh Liver of more music and less speech, Sold Out was released early in 1975 on Warner Bros. Records. After McGough and Gorman temporarily decamped to participate in the final Grimms LP Sleepers in 1976 and Gorman released his solo album, Go Man Gorman, The Scaffold moved to the Bronze Records label and continued touring and releasing singles through 1977. After that the group amicably disbanded (although there have been occasional reunions over the years, mostly for live performances).

=== After The Scaffold ===
After releasing a few more singles, McGear retired from the music business in the 1980s. Having proven himself artistically, he reverted to using his family name and has since carved out a career as a professional photographer and author. Gorman remained in the public eye through his regular appearances on such children's television programmes as Tiswas throughout the late 1970s and early 1980s. He continued to perform and record, and later moved into theatrical direction and production. Meanwhile, in 1978, McGough released his spoken-word solo album Summer With Monika (based upon his celebrated poetry collection of the same name). Since then he has arguably maintained the highest-profile and most sustained post-Scaffold career, still appearing regularly as a vocal performer on British radio and television, and continuing to be a highly regarded poet and author.

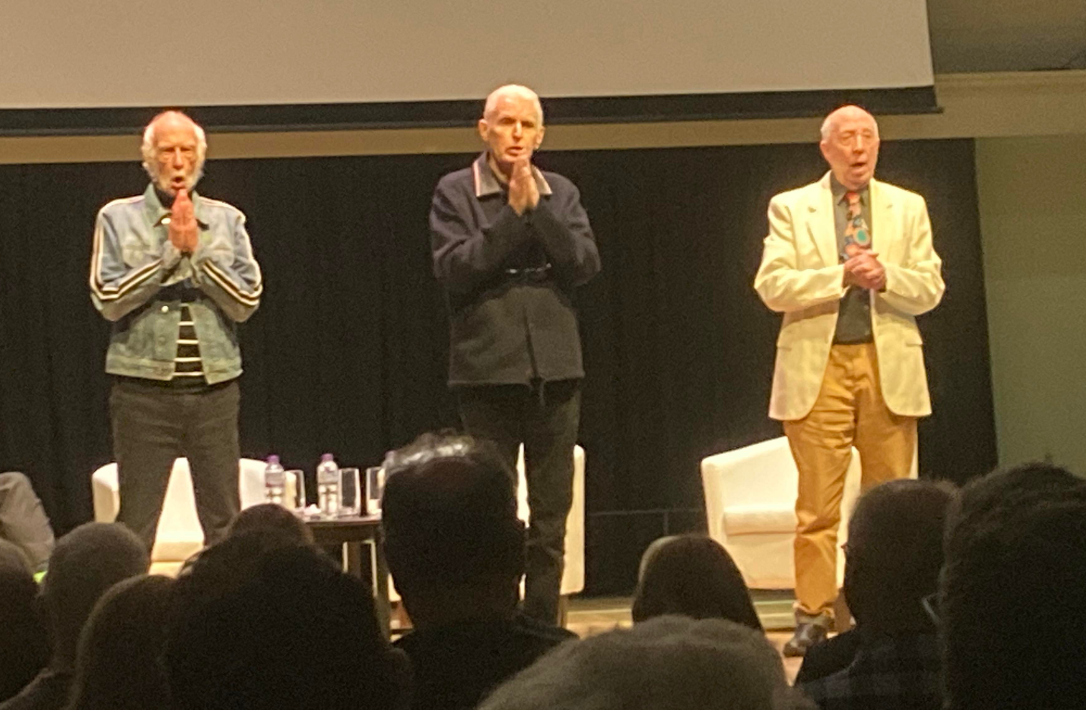
The Scaffold singing "Lily the Pink" in Bristol, 2023

A reunion occurred in 2008, to record a reworking of The Lightning Seeds' single "Three Lions", titled "3 Shirts on a Line", for Liverpool – The Number Ones Album, a compilation album commemorating Liverpool being the European Capital of Culture. McCartney and Gorman represented The Scaffold in the Number One Concert in the 10,500-seater Echo Arena, receiving a standing ovation from the capacity audience. In 2009, the classic lineup was reunited in Ronnie Scott's London Jazz Club for a BBC TV programme, and in October 2010, they reconvened for a Gala Concert in Shanghai, to celebrate the end of the Liverpool Pavilion as part of the World Expo. They shared the concert with the Royal Liverpool Philharmonic Orchestra, OMD and the Liverpool Chinese Children's Pagoda Orchestra.

In August 2013, McCartney and Gorman played to an international audience in the O2 as part of the Liverpool Music Festival. In October 2013 and 2014, the two played at the Heswall Arts Festival with musician and poet Keith Wilson, an occasional member of the line-up since 2008. The trio put on a concert to raise funds for the Nordic Church and Cultural Centre in Liverpool in October 2018.

McCartney and Gorman negotiated with promoters in Japan for appearances in Tokyo in 2015.

On 9 April 2020, the original members of the Scaffold released a re-worked version of "Thank U Very Much" in support of the British National Health Service staff during the COVID-19 pandemic. They recorded the new vocals on their iPhones and these were then put on the original backing track, the master of which McCartney had found in his attic.

== Discography ==
=== Albums ===
==== UK releases ====
- McGough and McGear (Parlophone PMC 7047 [mono], PCS 7047 [stereo]) [LP] May 1968
- The Scaffold (Parlophone PMC 7051 [mono], PCS 7051 [stereo]) [LP] July 1968
- L. the P. (Parlophone PMC 7077 [mono], PCS 7077 [stereo]) [LP] May 1969
- Fresh Liver (Island ILPS 9234) [LP] May 1973
- Sold Out (Warner Bros. K 56067) [LP] Feb. 1975
- The Scaffold Singles A's and B's (See For Miles CM 114) [LP] Oct. 1982 [Compilation, containing 22 EMI and Warner Bros tracks]
- McGough and McGear (Parlophone PCS 7332) [LP] Apr. 1989 [Reissue of the 1968 album]
- McGough and McGear (EMI CDP 7 91877 2) [CD] Apr. 1989 [Reissue of the 1968 album]
- The Best of the EMI Years: The Scaffold, The Songs (EMI CDP 7 985022) [CD] 10 Feb. 1992 [Compilation, containing 20 EMI tracks]
- The Very Best of The Scaffold (Wise Buy WB 885572) [CD] Feb. 1998 [Compilation, containing 12 EMI and Warner Bros tracks]
- The Scaffold at Abbey Road, 1966–1971 (EMI 7243 496435 2 9) [CD] Aug. 1998 [Compilation containing 27 EMI tracks, including seven previously unreleased]
- The Very Best of The Scaffold (EMI Gold 7243 5 38474 2 5) [CD] Mar. 2002 [Compilation, containing 26 EMI and Warner Bros tracks]
- Live at The Queen Elizabeth Hall 1968 (Él ACMEM63CD) [CD] Jan. 2006 [Reissue of the 1968 album, The Scaffold, recorded live on 10 February 1968]
- Liverpool – The Number Ones Album (EMI 50999 5 19522 2 8) [CD] Feb. 2008 [Multi-artist commemorative album, including one newly recorded track by Scaffold]

==== US releases ====
- Thank U Very Much (Bell 6018) [LP] Sept. 1968
- McGough and McGear (Real Gone Music RGM-0025) [CD] Feb. 2012 [Reissue of the 1968 album]

==== Japanese releases ====
- Sold Out (Muskrat RATCD 4228) [CD] Aug 2004 [Reissue of the 1975 album]
- Fresh Liver (Island UICY 94110) [CD] May 2009 [Reissue of the 1973 album]

=== Singles ===
UK releases

- "2 Day's Monday" / "3 Blind Jellyfish" (Parlophone R 5443) May 1966
- "Goodbat Nightman" / "Long Strong Black Pudding" (Parlophone R 5548) Dec. 1966
- "Thank U Very Much" / "Ide B The First" (Parlophone R 5643) Nov 1967
- "Do You Remember?" / "Carry On Krow" (Parlophone R 5679) Mar. 1968
- "1–2–3" / "Today" (Parlophone R 5703) June 1968
- "Lily the Pink" / "Buttons of Your Mind" (Parlophone R 5734) Oct. 1968
- "Charity Bubbles" / "Goose" (Parlophone R 5784) June 1969
- "Gin Gan Goolie" / "Liver Birds" (Parlophone R 5812) Oct 1969
- "All The Way Up" / "Please Sorry" (Parlophone R 5847) June 1970
- "Bus Dreams" / "If I Could Start All Over Again" (Parlophone R 5866) Oct 1970
- "Do The Albert" / "Commercial Break" (Parlophone R 5922) Oct. 1971
- "W.P.C. Hodges" / "I remember" - Two tracks from "Fresh Liver" credited to John Gorman (Island Records – WIP 6151) 1973
- "W.P.C. Hodges" / "B Side Yourself With Plod" - Picture Sleeve with same catalogue number as above, but credited to "P.C. Plod" (Island Records – WIP 6151) 1973
- "Lily the Pink" / "Thank U Very Much" / "Do You Remember?" (EMI 2085) Nov. 1973
- "Liverpool Lou" / "Ten Years After on Strawberry Jam" (Warner Bros K 16400) May 1974
- "Mummy Won't Be Home For Christmas" / "The Wind Is Blowing" (Warner Bros K 16488) Dec. 1974
- "Leaving of Liverpool" / "Pack of Cards" (Warner Bros K 16521) Mar. 1975
- "Wouldn't It Be Funny If You Didn't Have A Nose" / "Mr. Noselighter" (Bronze BRO 33) Oct. 1976
- "How D'You Do" / "Paper Underpants" (Bronze BRO 39) Apr. 1977
- "Lily the Pink" / "Thank U Very Much" / "Do You Remember?" / "Gin Gan Goolie" (EMI 2690) Oct. 1977

US releases

- "Thank U Very Much" / "Ide B The First" (Bell 701) Jan 1968
- "Do You Remember?" / "Carry On Krow" (Bell 724) May 1968
- "Lily the Pink" / "Buttons of Your Mind" (Bell 747) Dec. 1968
- "Charity Bubbles" / "Goose" (Bell B-821) Aug. 1969
- "Jelly Covered Cloud" / "Liver Birds" (Bell B-849) 1969
- "Liverpool Lou" / "Ten Years After on Strawberry Jam" (Warner Bros WBS 8001) July 1974

Canadian releases

- "Thank U Very Much" / "Ide B The First" (Capitol 72524) Feb. 1968
- "Lily the Pink" / "Buttons of Your Mind" (Capitol 72562) 1968
- "Liverpool Lou" / "Ten Years After on Strawberry Jam" (Warner Bros WBS 8001) July 1974

=== Discography notes ===
- The album, McGough and McGear, is by Roger McGough and Mike McGear. All other releases by The Scaffold.
- Tracks which were first released from 1973 onward show the artist as Scaffold (rather than The Scaffold).
- See also Mike McGear Discography.
- See also Grimms Discography.
- There were probably other albums released in Japan. The two above are included because they have not been released on CD in the UK.
- There has been considerable debate as to the meaning of the place, item, person or event described in the lyric of the song "Thank U Very Much" as the Aintree Iron. The songwriter himself, Mike McGear, has apparently refused to divulge its identity.

== See also ==
- Liverpool poets
