= Woman (Mike McGear album) =

Studio album by Michael McGear
- Released: 7 April 1972
- Recorded: March 1971 – early 1972
- Genre: Rock
- Length: 36:57
- Label: Island
- Producer: Roger McGough

Michael McGear chronology
Woman (1972)	McGear (1974)

Professional ratings
Review scores
Source	Rating
AllMusic	3/5 stars

Woman is the debut solo studio album by the English musician Mike McGear (spelled Michael on the cover), brother of former Beatle Paul McCartney, who also co-wrote a song, but is credited as a "friend". Roger McGough produced and co-wrote some songs with McGear. Woman was initially released on Island Records in April 1972, failing to chart though it received receptive reviews. The cover is a black-and-white photo of McGear/McCartney's mother, Mary McCartney.

== Track listing ==
All songs by Mike McGear & Roger McGough, except where noted.

1. "Woman" – 3:02
2. "Witness" – 4:11
3. "Jolly Good Show" / "Benna"+ – 3:25
4. "Roamin a Road" / "Benna (Reprise)"+ (Mike McGear) – 2:30
5. "Sister" (McGear) – 3:11
6. "Wishin" – 3:21
7. "Young Young Man (Five Years Ago)" / "Young Young Man (Five Years Later)" – 3:36
8. "Edward Heath" (McGear) – 0:55
9. "Bored as Butterscotch" (McGear, Roger McGough, Friend) – 2:50
10. "Uptowndowntown" / "Blackbeauty"+ (McGear) – 3:10
11. "Tiger" / "Strawberry Jam" – 7:20

+ short connecting pieces missing from the Edsel CD

== Personnel ==
- Mike McGear – vocals
- Roger McGough – guitars
- Andy Roberts – guitars
- Roger Bunn – bass guitar
- Dave Richards – bass guitar
- Zoot Money – piano, keyboards
- John Megginson – organ
- Brian Auger – keyboards
- Norman Yardley – harmonica
- Gerry Conway – drums, percussion
- Ginger Johnson – percussion
- Michael Rosen – horns
- Roger Ball – horns
- Cecil Moss – horns
- Chris Pyne – horns
- Malcolm Duncan – horns
- Paul Korda – backing vocals
- Steve Gould – backing vocals
- Alan Gorrie – backing vocals
- Centipede – strings
- Tony Coe – saxophones
