= Thank U Very Much (The Scaffold song) =

1967 single by the Scaffold

- Cover of the single released in Denmark

Single by the Scaffold
- B-side: "Ide B the First"
- Released: 3 November 1967
- Recorded: 1967
- Studio: EMI Studios
- Genre: Novelty
- Length: 2:27
- Label: Parlophone
- Songwriter: Mike McGear
- Producer: Tony Palmer

The Scaffold singles chronology
"Goodbat Nightman" (1967)	"Thank U Very Much" (1967)	"Do You Remember?" (1968)

"Thank U Very Much" is a song by Liverpudlian comedy trio the Scaffold, released as a single in November 1967. It became their first hit, entering the top ten in the UK.

== Background and release ==
"Thank U Very Much" was a last attempt by the Scaffold to achieve a hit record. Written by Mike McGear, it was inspired by a telephone call he had with his brother Paul McCartney. McCartney had given McGear a Nikon camera for his birthday and when McGear called to thank him, he decided to sing 'Thank you very much for my Nikon camera. Thank you very much'. After the phone call, the tune stuck in his head and he recorded it on a Grundig tape recorder. The song notably starts with the line 'Thank you very much for the Aintree Iron', which has caused much speculation over the meaning of Aintree Iron, with McGear having repeatedly refused to divulge its meaning. The "Aintree Iron" was revealed by John Gorman on BBC Radio Merseyside in 2022 to be one of the first motorised taxi cabs in England.

During the recording of the song at EMI Studios, McCartney visited, and though he liked the song, he told McGear to change the title as it was "too oblique". McGear objected saying that the whole song was oblique. In an interview upon the single's release, McGear said "we recorded it because we wanted to bring a spark of happiness into this hard, dull world of ours. Look at the records around you and there's no happy, bouncy get-it-down you ones. 'Thank U Very Much' is about drugs, women, sex and depravity".

Released at the beginning of November 1967, "Thank U Very Much" didn't reach its peak on the UK charts until two months later at the beginning of January 1968. It performed best on the Record Retailer, peaking at number 4. Released in the US in January 1968, the song peaked at number 69 on the Billboard Hot 100, though performed better on the Record World chart, achieving a peak at number 43. Elsewhere, "Thank U Very Much" performed best in New Zealand where it was top the Listener chart. The song was notably a favourite of Queen Elizabeth the Queen Mother and of the then-Prime Minister Harold Wilson.

Reviewing for Disc and Music Echo, Penny Valentine described "Thank U Very Much" as "a very well-recorded little send-up record about life today. It has a jolly metronome beat and, if anything they do is aimed at a commercial market, this is the nearest they've got yet". Peter Jones for Record Mirror described it as "a great old send-up of those ever-so-grateful-for-things songs – and it's pushed along at such a rare old pace that it's very catchy indeed. Maybe it's too much of a novelty but given the dee-jay support it must do well".

A 1968 broadcast of the radio series Round the Horne (Series 4, Episode 6) featured a version of the song with the words changed to those of movie stars. It includes references to John Wayne in "Tobruk" although he never appeared in the film.

During the 1970s and 1980s, a cover version of the song, "Thank You Very Much For Your Kind Donation" was used for Telethons in Australia and New Zealand whenever a large donation was made.

In the UK, the song was also adapted as the jingle for Cadbury Roses beginning in 1982, and remained associated with the brand's "Thank You Very Much" advertising campaign until 1998.

In 2020, during the COVID-19 pandemic, the Scaffold reworked "Thank U Very Much" using the original backing track and released it as a single in aid of the frontline healthcare workers, with the money raised going to the NHS Charities Together.

== Charts ==
Chart (1968)	Peak position
Australia (Kent Music Report)	56
Canada Top Singles (RPM)	12
Denmark (Danmarks Radio)	8
Ireland (IRMA)	18
Netherlands (Dutch Top 40)	15
Netherlands (Single Top 100)	13
New Zealand (Listener)	1
Rhodesia (Lyons Maid)	2
Sweden (Kvällstoppen)	11
Sweden (Tio i Topp)	6
UK Melody Maker Top 30	5
UK New Musical Express Top 30	7
UK Record Retailer Top 50	4
US Billboard Hot 100	69
US Cash Box Top 100	65
US Record World 100 Top Pops	43
