= Gibberish =

Nonsensical speech or writing

Gibberish, also known as jibber-jabber or gobbledygook, is speech that is (or appears to be) nonsense: ranging across speech sounds that are not actual words, pseudowords, language games, and specialized jargon that seems nonsensical to outsiders.

Gibberish is also used as an imprecation to denigrate or tar ideas or opinions the user disagrees with or finds irksome, a rough equivalent of nonsense, folderol, balderdash, or claptrap. The implication is that the criticized expression or proposition lacks substance or congruence, as opposed to being a differing view.

The related word jibber-jabber refers to rapid talk that is difficult to understand.

== Etymology ==
The etymology of gibberish is uncertain. The term was seen in English in the early 16th century. It is generally thought to be an onomatopoeia imitative of speech, similar to the words jabber (to talk rapidly) and gibber (to speak inarticulately).

It may originate from the word jib, which is the Angloromani variant of the Romani language word meaning 'language' or 'tongue'. To non-speakers, the Anglo-Romany dialect could sound like English mixed with nonsense words, and if those seemingly nonsensical words are referred to as jib then the term gibberish could be derived as a descriptor for nonsensical speech.

Samuel Johnson, in A Dictionary of the English Language, published in 1755, wrote that the word gibberish "is probably derived from the chymical cant, and originally implied the jargon of Geber and his tribe." The theory was that gibberish came from the name of a famous 8th century Muslim alchemist, Jābir ibn Hayyān, whose name was Latinized as Geber. Thus, gibberish was a reference to the incomprehensible technical jargon and allegorical coded language used by Jabir and other alchemists. After 1818, editors of Johnson's Dictionary rejected that origin theory.

A discredited alternative theory asserts that it is derived from the Irish word gob or gab ('mouth') or from the Irish phrase Geab ar ais ('back talk', 'backward chat'). The latter Irish etymology was suggested by Daniel Cassidy, whose work has been criticised by linguists and scholars. The terms geab and geabaire are certainly Irish words, but the phrase geab ar ais does not exist, and the word gibberish exists as a loan-word in Irish as gibiris.

The term gobbledygook was coined by Maury Maverick, a former congressman from Texas and former mayor of San Antonio. When Maverick was chairman of the Smaller War Plants Corporation during World War II, he sent a memorandum that said: "Be short and use plain English. ... Stay off gobbledygook language." Maverick defined gobbledygook as "talk or writing which is long, pompous, vague, involved, usually with Latinized words." The allusion was to a turkey, "always gobbledygobbling and strutting with ridiculous pomposity."

== Use ==
=== Gobbledygook ===
The term "gobbledygook" has a long history of use in politics to deride deliberately obscure statements and complicated but ineffective explanations. The following are a few examples:

- Richard Nixon's Oval Office tape from June 14, 1971, showed H. R. Haldeman describing a situation to Nixon as "... a bunch of gobbledygook. But out of the gobbledygook comes a very clear thing: You can't trust the government; you can't believe what they say."
- President Ronald Reagan explained tax law revisions in an address to the nation with the word, May 28, 1985, saying that "most didn't improve the system; they made it more like Washington itself: Complicated, unfair, cluttered with gobbledygook and loopholes, designed for those with the power and influence to hire high-priced legal and tax advisers."
- Supreme Court of the United States justice John Roberts dismissed quantitative sociological reasoning as "gobbledygook" in 2017, when arguing against using any mathematical test for gerrymandering.
- Michael Shanks, former chairman to the National Consumer Council of Great Britain, characterized professional gobbledygook as sloppy jargon intended to confuse nonspecialists: "'Gobbledygook' may indicate a failure to think clearly, a contempt for one's clients, or more probably a mixture of both. A system that can't or won't communicate is not a safe basis for a democracy."

==== In popular culture ====
- The Gobbledy Gooker was the name of a short-lived and fairly notorious character portrayed by former WWF wrestler Héctor Guerrero. Introduced in 1990 with the intent of eventually serving as a sort of corporate mascot for the federation, the Gooker was an anthropomorphic turkey who communicated solely in unintelligible gibberish and used a rock and roll version of "Turkey in the Straw" as its entrance music.

=== In acting ===
Using gibberish whilst acting can be used as an improvisation exercise in theatre arts education.

=== In song ===
The Italian musical artist Adriano Celentano wrote and performed the song "Prisencolinensinainciusol" in gibberish as an intentional mimic of the sound of English to those who are not fluent in the language.

Mary Poppins features a song called "supercalifragilisticexpialidocious," a nonsense word whose only purpose is to be the longest word in English, though it is not.

== Other terms and usage ==
The terms officialese or bureaucratese refer to language used by officials or authorities. Legalese is a closely related concept, referring to language used by lawyers, legislators, and others involved with the law. The language used in these fields may contain complex sentences and specialized jargon or buzzwords, making it difficult for those outside the field to understand. Speakers or writers of officialese or legalese may recognize that it is confusing or even meaningless to outsiders, but view its use as appropriate within their organization or group.

Bafflegab is a synonym, a slang term referring to confusing or a generally unintelligible use of jargon.

== See also ==
- Babbling
- Double-talk
- Gibberlink
- Ging Gang Goolie
- Glossolalia
- Grammelot
- Happy Tree Friends
- Lorem ipsum
- Macaronic language
- Minionese
- Mojibake
- Mumbo jumbo (phrase)
- Nonsense
- Nonsense word
- Onomatopoeia
- Pig Latin
- Pingu, an animated children's television series that features a gibberish "penguin language"
- Prisencolinensinainciusol
- Scat singing
- Simlish
- Slang
- SMOG
- Spin (propaganda)
- Stanley Unwin (comedian)
- Technobabble
- Walla
- Word salad, a style of speaking or writing containing seemingly random words, often indicative of mental illness
- Zaum
