= Acoustic data transmission =

Transmission of digital data through sound

Acoustic data transmission, also known as data over sound, is a method for transmitting digital information using acoustic signals, i.e. via audible or inaudible sound waves.

An early example of this technology were acoustic couplers, used in the early days of digital data communication to connect data processing systems to the telephone network solely via audio signals. A recent research project is Gibberlink, a method in which two AI voice assistants, after recognizing each other, switch from English to a special sound-based communication protocol.

Depending on the environment, data transmission rates of up to 1,000 bit/s can be achieved. Distances of up to 10 meters are realistic with standard consumer hardware; longer ranges can be covered using high-powered speaker systems.

== Applications ==
This method is used for device identification, authentication, and command transmission, enabling acoustic communication between devices by using speakers and microphones to send and receive encoded data.

Since acoustic data transmission allows for wireless communication without radio frequency (RF) signals, it can be employed in environments where RF is restricted or prohibited—such as military facilities, hospitals, or aircraft.

As sound signals can propagate under water acoustic data transmission can be used for data exchange between submerged devices like submarines.

== See also ==
- Modem
- Acoustic coupler
- Software-defined radio
- Digital signal processing
- Digital-to-analog converter
