= John van Geen =

American audio engineer

- Born: August 17, 1929; Etterbeek, Belgium
- Died: June 6, 2000 (aged 70); Monterey Peninsula, USA
- Education: Brussels University
- Scientific career
- Workplaces: SRI International

John van Geen (August 17, 1929 – June 6, 2000) was a researcher at the Stanford Research Institute (now SRI International) who was known for his advances in the acoustically coupled modem.

== Early life and education ==
Van Geen was born in 1929 in Etterbeek, Belgium. In 1953, he received a degree in electrical and radio engineering from Brussels University.

== Career ==
In 1959, Van Geen joined the Stanford Research Institute. Van Geen's enhancements to the modem in 1966 allowed the designed receiver to detect data (in the form of bits) and distinguish it from background noise more reliably than any previous models. Van Geen's acoustic coupler used a speaker and a microphone to pick up and then transmit the different signals

His advancements also led to the release of the first public modem. It appealed to the public because it mimicked the characteristics of a standard telephone handset at that time.

Van Geen retired from the Stanford Research Institute in 1989 after 30 years there. He died on June 6, 2000, in Monterey Peninsula.
