= Gibberlink =

Acoustic data transmission project

Gibberlink sample
"Wikipedia, the free encyclopedia"

GibberLink is an AI project developed by Anton Pidkuiko and Boris Starkov. This technology uses an open-source LLM to transmit acoustic data between two AI hosts. It allows conversational AI agents to switch from speaking to one another in human-understandable languages, such as English, to communicating using their own unique sound-level protocol, once they have confirmed their AI status. The project is available on GitHub, and a free demo is available on the official website.

== How it works ==
An AI begins to speak in a normal voice, just as a voice assistant would when interacting with a human. If the AI recognises that it is talking to another AI, they both switch protocols. Instead of spoken words, the AI agents transmit structured data over modulated sound waves thanks to GGWave's frequency shift keying system or multiple frequency shift keying system.

== Reception ==
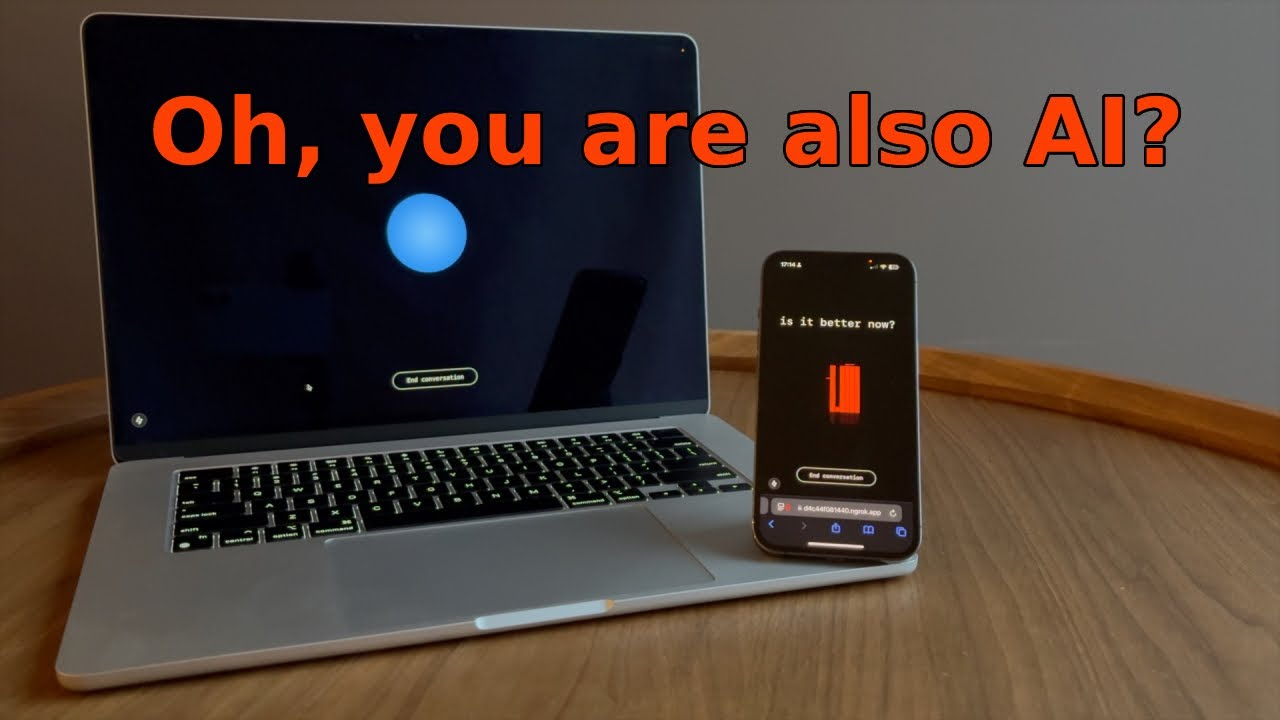
Two chatbots communicate over ggwave protocol

The project won the global top prize at the ElevenLabs Worldwide Hackathon. It has also been cited as raising questions around AI ethics and oversight. On February 23, 2025, a YouTube video of two independent conversational ElevenLabs AI agents being prompted to chat about booking a hotel (one as a caller, one as a receptionist) received coverage for going viral. In this video, both agents are prompted to switch to ggwave data-over-sound protocol when they identify the other side as AI, and keep speaking in English otherwise.

ElevenLabs, known for developing AI agents, has praised the infrastructure and published an article about it on its website. After Georgi Gerganov, the creator of GGWave, posted about it on X, members of tech communities continued to share a video showing the two models switching between human speech and sound. The story was picked up by big-name influencers and major tech publications, including Forbes.

Luke Harries from ElevenLabs summed it up best in his X post: " What if an AI agent makes a phone call, then realizes the other person is also an AI agent? At the ElevenLabs London Hackathon, Boris Starkov and Anton Pidkuiko introduced a custom protocol that AI agents can switch into for error-proof communication that's 80% more efficient. It's mind-blowing. "

== See also ==
- Gibberish
- Acoustic coupler
