= PocketMail =

Mobile computer

PocketMail was a very small and inexpensive mobile computer, with a built-in acoustic coupler, developed by PocketScience.

== History ==
PocketMail was developed by the company PocketScience and used technology developed by NASA. This was the first ever mass-market mobile email. The hardware cost around US$100 and the service was initially US$9.95 per month for unlimited use. Later the monthly fee increased. After the company made a reference hardware design, leading consumer electronics manufacturers Audioxo, Sharp, JVC, and others made their own PocketMail devices. Later a PocketMail dongle was created for the PalmPilot. PocketMail users were given a custom email address or able to synch up PocketMail with their existing email account (including AOL accounts). Although actually a computer, its main function was email. Its main advantages were that it was simple, and that it worked with any phone, even outside the United States. It was a low-cost personal digital assistant (PDA) with an inbuilt acoustic coupler which allowed users to send and receive email while connected to a normal telephone, thus allowing use outside of mobile phone range, or without the need to be signed up with a mobile telephone provider. Popularity of the PocketMail peaked around 2000, when the company stopped investing in new technology development.

In Australia, the company known as PocketMail in 2007 stopped marketing the PocketMail service, changed its name to Adavale Resources Limited and now owns uranium mining prospects in Queensland and South Australia.

== Websites ==
- Dan's Data Review: http://www.dansdata.com/pocketmail.htm
- TechCrunch: Nostalgiamatic: The Sharp TM-20 with PocketMail
- Government Computer News: With PocketMail, e-mail access is phone call away
- JVC's PocketMail offers e-mail without computer or modem
- InfoWorld Review of Sharp PocketMail device
- Cracked.com's list of "The 5 Most Ridiculously Awful Computers Ever Made
