= Ging Gang Goolie =

1905 popular song often sung by Guides and Scouts

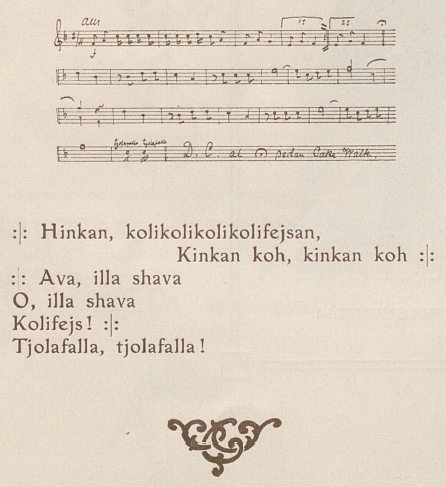
Swedish version of the song from the program for a 1905 revue

"Ging Gang Gooli(-e)" or "Ging Gang Goo" is a gibberish song, widely spread around the world. It is popular among Scouts.

== Origin ==
In 1905 the song, with Scandinavian spelling of the gibberish, was presented at a New Year's revue in Gothenburg, Sweden. The lyrics and the melody were presumably derived from student singing in Central Europe. Robert Baden-Powell is often quoted as the originator of the song, but there is no evidence that he was involved in its creation or introduction. After early adoption by the Scandinavian Scout organisations, the song eventually became (starting in the 1940s and 1950s) a global hit among Scouts. The melody is the same today as in 1905, whereas the spelling of the lyrics has changed in translations.

The 1905 lyrics:

Hinkan, kolikolikolikolifejsan / Kinkan koh, kinkan koh

Hinkan, kolikolikolikolifejsan / Kinkan koh, kinkan koh
Ava, illa shava / O illa shava / Kolifejs!
Ava, illa shava / O illa shava / Kolifejs!

Tjolafalla, tjolafalla!

Phoneticized to English (earliest documented version 1952; many other variations in spelling and phonemes exist):

Ging gang, goolie goolie goolie goolie watcha / Ging gang goo, Ging gang goo

Ging gang, goolie goolie goolie goolie watcha / Ging gang goo, Ging gang goo
Heyla, heyla sheyla / Heyla sheyla / Heyla, ho!
Heyla, heyla sheyla / Heyla sheyla / Heyla, ho!
Shallawalla, shallawalla! / Shallawalla, shallawalla!

Oompah-oompah! / Oompah-oompah!

== Versions ==
Probably the earliest commercial recording of the song, entitled "Kinkan" and performed by the Lyran and Gleeklubben societies of New York, was released by the Columbia Phonograph Company in 1926.

In 1969, a version was recorded by British comedic group The Scaffold. Released as a single, "Gin Gan Goolie" reached number 38 on the UK Singles Chart.

In 1991 Dorothy Unterschutz, a Scout Leader from Edmonton, Canada, wrote a dramatization of the song in the form of a tale named "The Great Grey Ghost Elephant". It was published in Scouts Canada's The Leader magazine in the 1991 June–July issue (p. 7).
