= Score with the Scaffold =

British television children's programme (1970–1971)

Score with the Scaffold is a BBC children's programme, which ran during 1970–71. It starred the pop group The Scaffold.

It was a quiz programme, although interspersed with various material including musical numbers and sketches. It ran for two series, and the format was revised between the first and second series. In the first series The Scaffold co-presented the programme with Wendy Padbury and they asked questions which the audience were supposed to answer. In the second series they brought they were joined by Annabel Scase, and it was a contest between two teams of children each representing a different BBC local radio station.
