= McGear =

Studio album by Mike McGear
- Released: 24 September 1974
- Recorded: January – February 1974; 26 April 1973 ("Leave It")
- Studios: Strawberry Studios (Stockport, England)
- Genre: Rock
- Length: 43:30
- Label: Warner Bros.
- Producer: Paul McCartney

Mike McGear chronology
Woman (1972)	McGear (1974)

Singles from McGear
- 1. "Leave It" Released: 1974; 2. "Sea Breezes / Givin' Grease A Ride" Released: 1974; 3. "Simply Love You" Released: 1975

Professional ratings
Review scores
Source	Rating
AllMusic	4.5/5 stars

McGear is the second and final solo studio album by the English singer Mike McGear, released in 1974. The album is a collaboration between McGear and his brother Paul McCartney, who co-wrote and produced the record. All backing tracks on the album are performed by McCartney and his band Wings, occasionally accompanied by guest artists. Lead vocals are sung by McGear.

== History ==
Paul and Mike began planning for the album in July 1973. After Mike left the music and poetry group Grimms during a tour after a fight with Liverpool Poet (and fellow member) Brian Patten, Paul suggested that Mike record a single with Wings to resurrect Mike's solo career. Once the single "Leave It" was recorded at Abbey Road Studios, Paul sent the tape to his in-laws Lee and John Eastman to arrange for its release, but instead they suggested recording an entire album. Mike said of the album that "the whole process was magical" and that the recording "was a truly collaborative process with my older brother." The rest of the album was recorded at Strawberry Studios in Stockport, where Mike had recorded his previous solo album Woman. McCartney used the album's sessions to audition possible members of Wings after the band's lead guitarist and drummer quit the year before.

When Warner Brothers signed McGear and Badfinger with some fanfare, coinciding with McCartney's EMI contract nearing expiration, it was rumoured that Warner Brothers were trying to interest McCartney in signing with them.

The front cover shows Mike captured like Gulliver, surrounded by little people. Included in the people are pictures of the band members and photos of other people from McGear's life, as well as a childhood picture of Paul and Mike.

On the original release Paul McCartney is not credited as a musician or backing singer, although he performed both roles during the recordings.

Lead single "Leave It" reached No. 36 in the UK singles chart, becoming the sole charting single by Mike McGear. The opening track on the album, "Sea Breezes", is a Roxy Music cover from their self-titled debut album.

== Re-releases ==
In 1991, McGear was re-released by Rykodisc in the U.S. with a previously unreleased version of the song "Dance The Do" as a bonus track (a different mix had been issued as a stand-alone single on UK Warner Bros).

In 1992, McGear was re-released by See For Miles Records in the U.K. with two bonus tracks, a different mix of "Dance The Do" and "Sweet Baby," which had been the B-side of the single "Leave It". The liner notes to that album quote Mike as saying that "Sweet Baby" had originally been named "All My Lovin'" but "some other group had already done one with that name". Both of these reissues quickly went out of print.

In 2019, Cherry Red Records produced a two-disc remastered reissue on its "Esoteric Records" imprint (which features an "ER" logo duplicative of the Warner Brothers "WB" logo), with one disc the same as the 1992 reissue, and the other disc a collection of alternate takes, outtakes, and a few other songs recorded by McGear between 1973 and 1980 (including his 1976 EMI single "Do Nothing All Day").

== Track listing ==
All songs by Mike McGear, Paul McCartney and Linda McCartney except where noted.

1. "Sea Breezes" (Bryan Ferry) – 4:29
2. "What Do We Really Know?" (P. McCartney, L. McCartney) – 3:47
3. "Norton" – 2:35
4. "Leave It" (P. McCartney, L. McCartney) – 3:44
5. "Have You Got Problems?" – 6:16
6. "The Casket" (P. McCartney, L. McCartney, Roger McGough) – 4:19
7. "Rainbow Lady" – 3:26
8. "Simply Love You" – 2:47
9. "Givin' Grease a Ride" – 5:35
10. "The Man Who Found God on the Moon" – 6:26

2019 reissue bonus tracks:
All songs by Mike McGear, except where noted.

11. "Dance the Do" (McGear, P. McCartney, L. McCartney) – 3:53
12. "Sweet Baby" (McGear, P. McCartney, L. McCartney) – 3:47
13. "Sea Breezes" (Without Orchestra) (Bryan Ferry) – 4:36
14. "Leave It" (Extended Version) (McGear, P. McCartney, L. McCartney) – 6:40
15. "Dance The Do" (Rough 1st Mix) (McGear, P. McCartney, L. McCartney) – 3:50
16. "What Do We Really Know?" (Monitor Mix) (P. McCartney, L. McCartney) – 3:49
17. "Paddy Pipes 1" – 1:17
18. "Do Nothing All Day" – 2:23
19. "A To Z" – 3:20
20. "Girls On The Avenue" (Richard Clapton) – 3:39
21. "Paddy Pipes 2" – 0:37
22. "All The Whales In The Ocean" – 4:36
23. "Blowin’ In The Bay" – 2:30
24. "Keep Cool (Version 1)" – 0:50
25. "Keep Cool (Version 2)" – 0:45
26. "I Just Want What You Got – Money!" – 3:31
27. "Paddy Pipes 3" – 1:32
28. "Viv Stanshall Sings" – 0:45
29. "Let’s Turn The Radio On" – 3:07
30. "Dance The Do Radio Ad 1" – 0:15
31. "Dance The Do Radio Ad 2" – 1:02

== Personnel ==
- Mike McGear – lead vocals
- Paul McCartney – backing and harmony vocals, bass, guitars, piano, keyboards, synthesizers, drums (2019 reissue only)
- Linda McCartney – backing and harmony vocals, keyboards, synthesizers
- Denny Laine – backing and harmony vocals, guitars
- Jimmy McCulloch – guitars
- Gerry Conway – drums, percussion
- Denny Seiwell – drums, percussion (on "Leave It")
- Brian Jones – saxophones
- Tony Coe – saxophones (on "Leave It")
- Paddy Moloney – uilleann pipes (on "The Casket")
- Derek Taylor – speaking voice (on "Norton")
- Benna and Theran McCartney (Mike's daughters) – backing vocals (on "The Man Who Found God on the Moon")
- The Halle Orchestra, arranged and conducted by Gerry Allison
