= Acoustic coupler =

Device for coupling electrical signals by sound

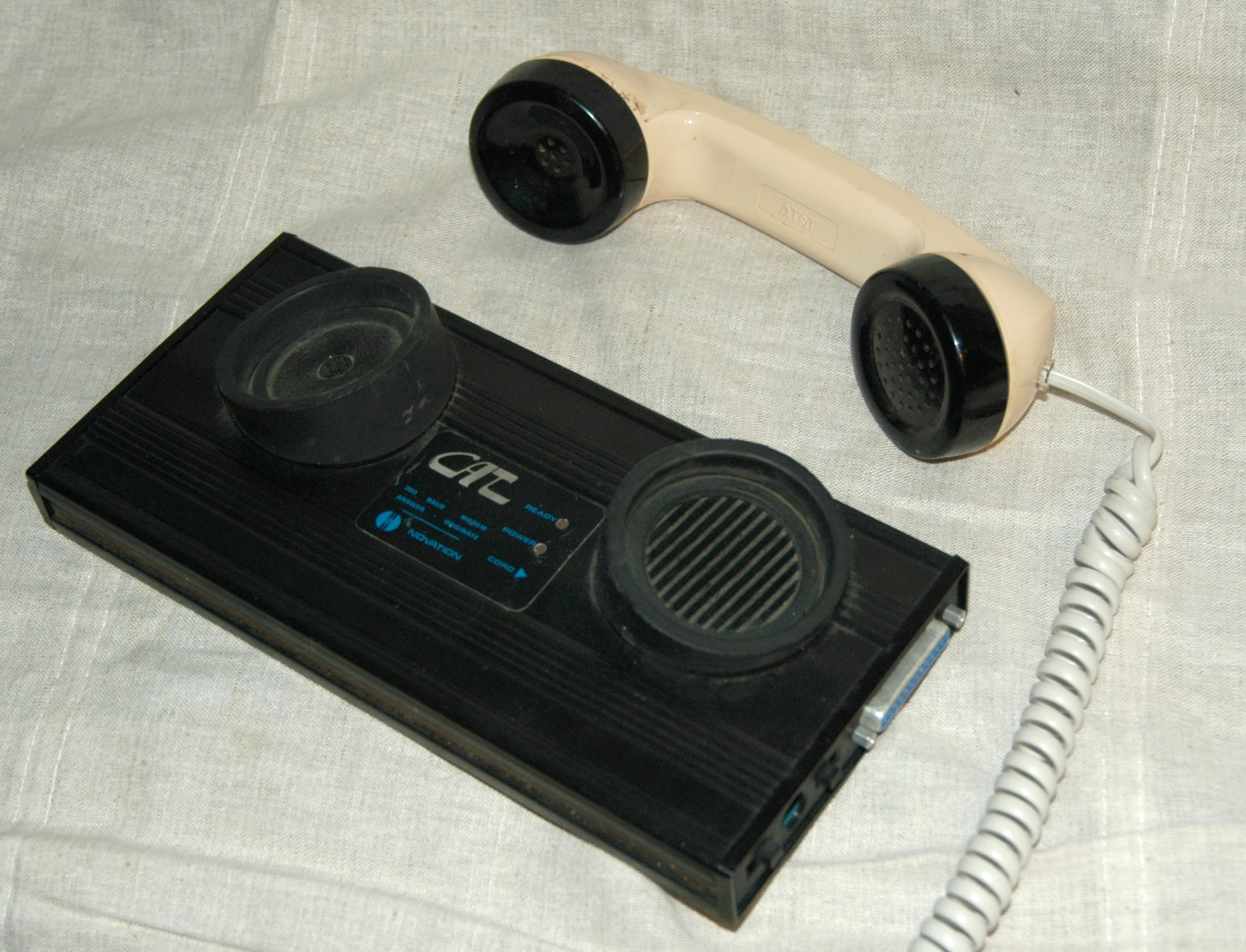
The Novation CAT acoustically coupled modem

In telecommunications, an acoustic coupler is an interface device for coupling electrical signals by acoustical means, usually into and out of a telephone. The link is achieved through converting electric signals from the phone line to sound and reconverting sound to electric signals needed for the end terminal, such as a teletypewriter, and back, rather than through direct electrical connection. Acoustic couplers can be considered an early method of acoustic data transmission.

== History and applications ==
Prior to its breakup in 1984, Bell System's legal monopoly over telephony in the United States allowed the company to impose strict rules on how consumers could access their network. Customers were prohibited from connecting equipment not made or sold by Bell to the network. The same set-up was operative in nearly all countries, where the telephone companies were nationally owned. In many households, telephones were hard-wired to wall terminals before connectors like RJ11 and BS 6312 became standardized.

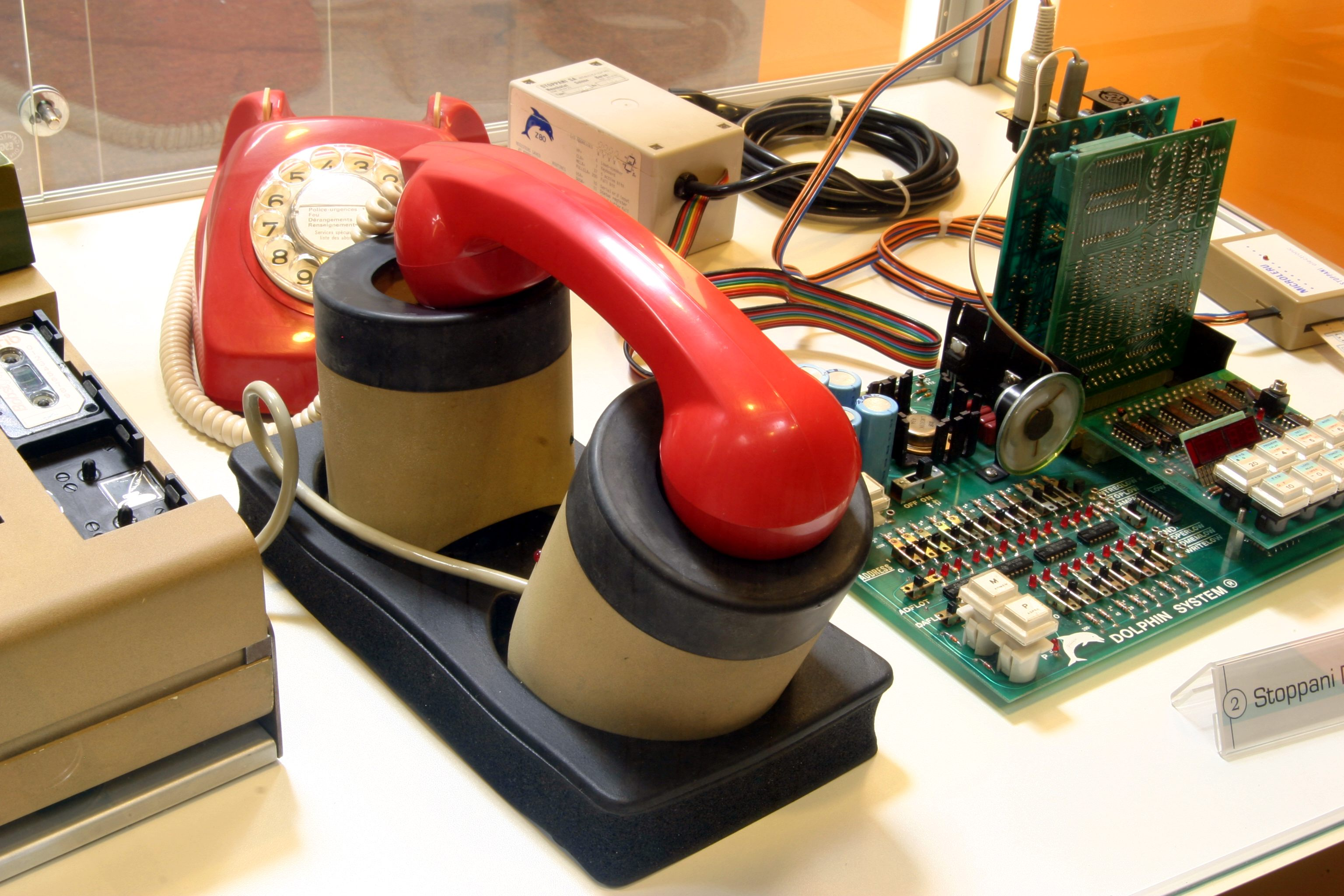

The situation was similar in other countries. In Australia, until 1975 the PMG, a government monopoly, owned all telephone wiring and equipment in user premises and prohibited attachment of third-party devices, and while most handsets were connected by 600 series connectors, these were rare in Australia so imported equipment could not be directly connected in any case, despite the general electrical compatibility.

It was not until a landmark U.S. court ruling regarding the Hush-A-Phone in 1956 that the use of a phone attachment (by a third party vendor) was allowed for the first time; although AT&T's right to regulate any device connected to the telephone system was upheld by the courts, they were instructed to cease interference towards Hush-A-Phone users. A second court decision in 1968 regarding the Carterfone further allowed any device not harmful to the system to be connected directly to the AT&T network. This decision enabled the proliferation of later innovations like answering machines, fax machines, and modems.

When inventors began developing devices to send non-voice signals over a telephone line, the need for a workaround for the Bell restrictions was apparent. As early as 1937, telefax machines used by newspapers were using some kind of couplers, possibly acoustic but more likely magnetic for single-directional communication. Multiplexed bidirectional telephone coupling was not needed by these early fax machines.

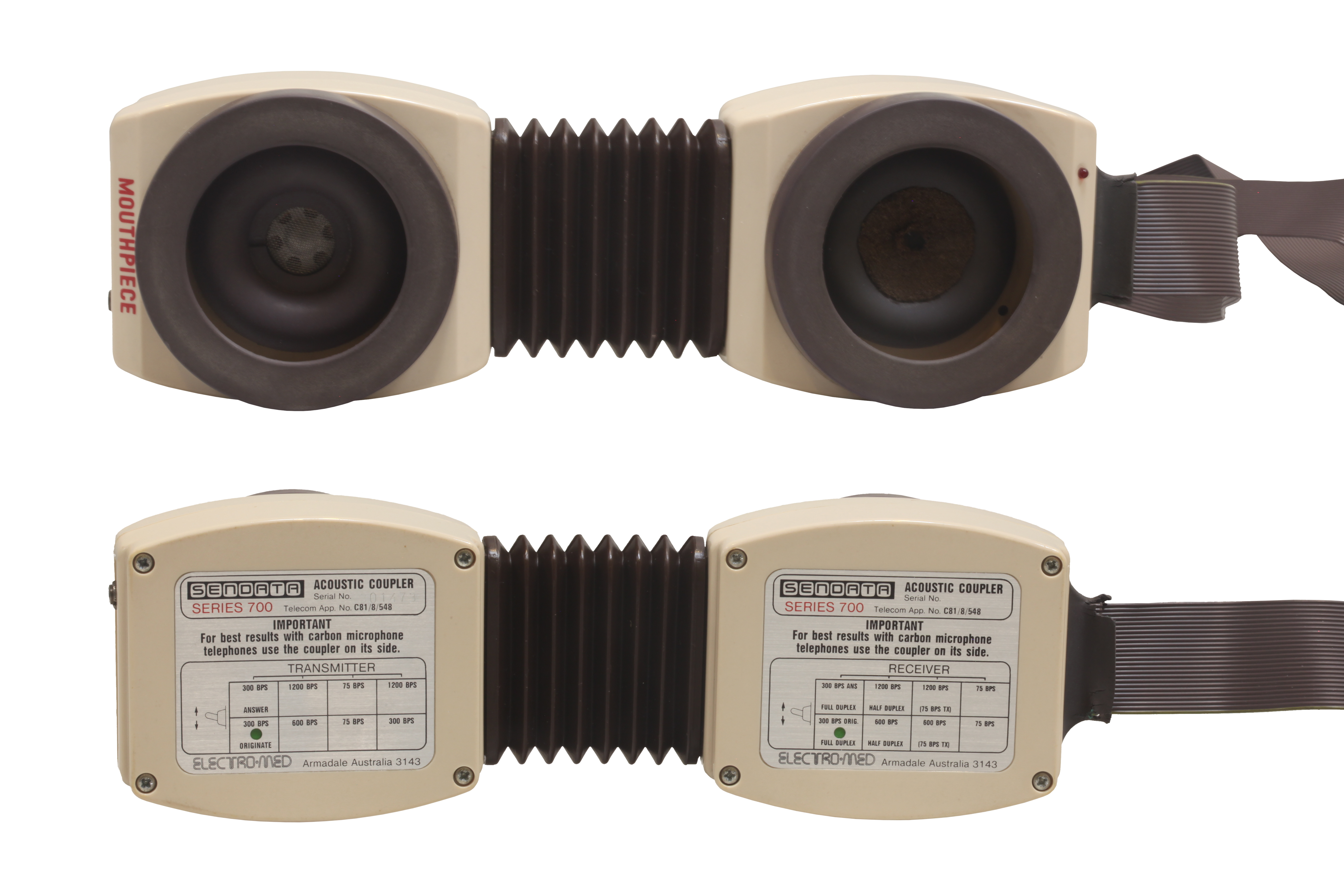
Sendata Series 700

Robert Weitbrecht created a workaround for the Bell restrictions in 1963. He developed a coupling device that converted sound from the ear piece of the telephone handset to electrical signals, and converted the electrical pulses coming from the teletypewriter to sound that goes into the mouth piece of the telephone handset. His acoustic coupler is known as the Weitbrecht Modem.

The Weitbrecht Modem inspired other engineers to develop other modems to work with 8-bit ASCII terminals at a faster rate. Such modems or couplers were developed around 1966 by John van Geen at the Stanford Research Institute (now SRI International), that mimicked handset operations. An early commercial model was built by Livermore Data Systems in 1968. One would dial the computer system (which would have telephone company datasets) on one's phone, and when the connection was established, place the handset into the acoustic modem. Since the handsets were typically supplied by the telephone company, most of them were the same shape, therefore simplifying the physical interface. A microphone and a speaker inside the modem box would pick up and transmit the signaling tones, and circuitry would convert those audio frequency-shift keying encoded binary signals for an RS232 output socket. With luck one could get 300 baud (~bits/second) transmission rates, but 150 baud was more typical. That speed was sufficient for typewriter-based terminals, as the IBM 2741, running at 134.5 baud, or a teleprinter, running at 110 baud.

The practical upper limit for acoustic-coupled modems was 1200 baud, first made available in 1973 by Vadic and 1977 by AT&T. 1200 baud endpoints became widespread in 1985 with the advent of the Hayes Smartmodem 1200A, though it used an RJ11 jack and was not an acoustic coupler. Such devices facilitated the creation of dial-up bulletin board systems, a forerunner of modern internet chat rooms, message boards, and e-mail.

== Design ==
Usually, a telephone handset was placed into a cradle that had been engineered to fit closely (by the use of rubber seals) around its microphone and earpiece. A modem would modulate a loudspeaker in the cup attached to the handset's microphone, and sound from the speaker in the telephone handset's earpiece would be picked up by a microphone in the cup attached to that. In this way signals could be passed in both directions. Despite the use of seals, acoustic couplers were sensitive to external noise and depended on the then-widespread standardization of the size and shape of handsets.

Once direct electrical connections to telephone networks were made legal, they rapidly became the preferred method of attaching modems, and the use of acoustic couplers dwindled. Acoustic couplers were still used until at least the late 1990s by people travelling in areas of the world where electrical connection to the telephone network was illegal or impractical. Many models of Telecommunications Device for the Deaf (TDD) still have a built-in acoustic coupler, which allow more universal use with pay phones and for emergency calls by deaf people.

== Popular culture ==
An acoustic coupler (a Novation CAT 300 baud model) is prominently shown early in the 1983 film WarGames, when character David Lightman (portrayed by actor Matthew Broderick) places a telephone handset into the cradle of a prop acoustic modem to accentuate the act of using telephone lines for interconnection to the developing computer networks of the period—in this case, a military command computer. The earliest major motion picture depicting an acoustic coupler was probably the 1968 Steve McQueen film Bullitt.

== See also ==
- Acoustic data transmission
- Carterfone
- Federal Standard 1037C
- MIL-STD-188
- Telecommunications device for the deaf
- PocketMail
